= Patton Building =

- U.S. National Register of Historic Places
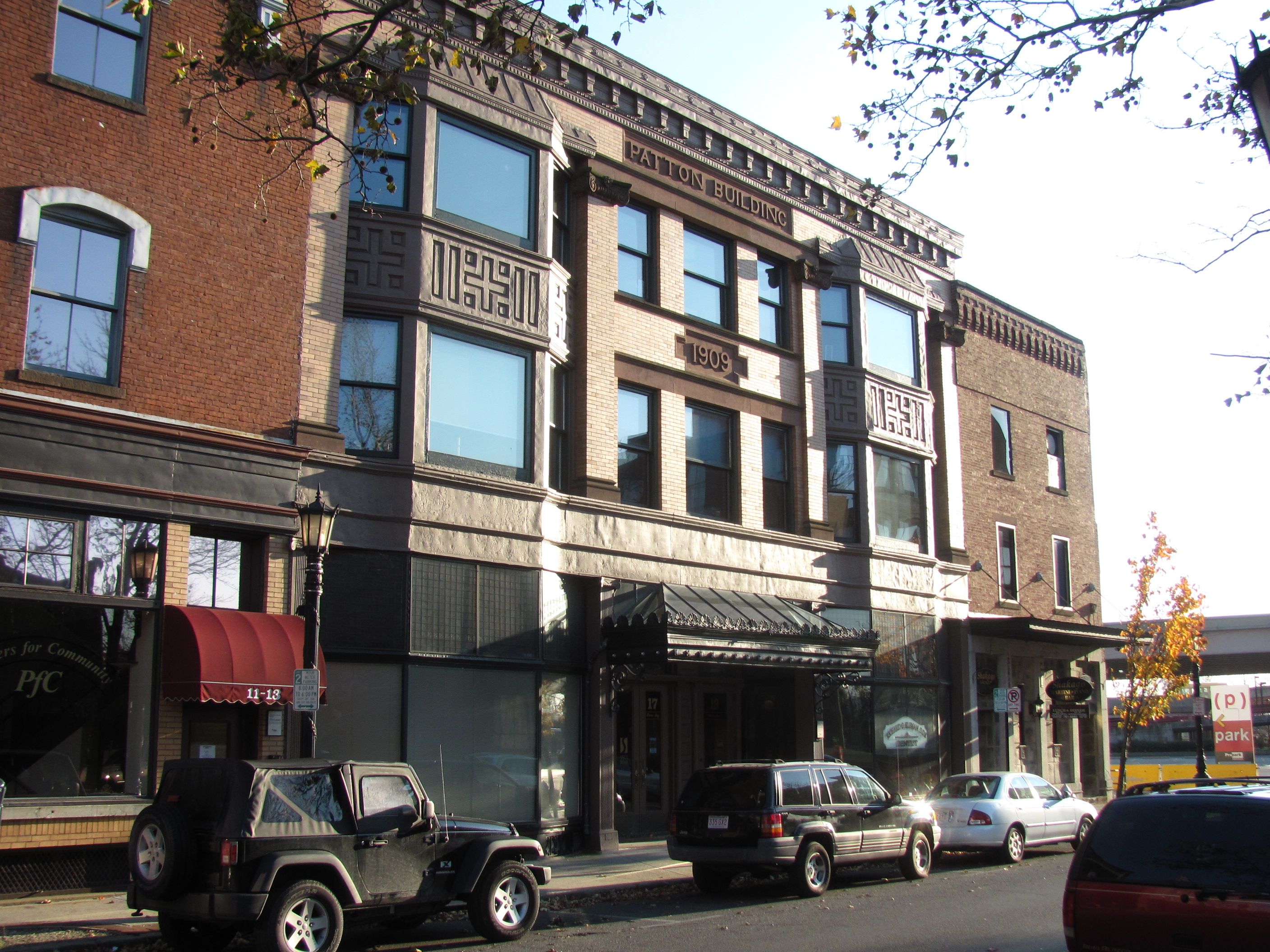

- Location within Massachusetts Location within the United States
- Location: 15-19 Hampden St., Springfield, Massachusetts
- Coordinates: 42°6′13″N 72°35′40″W
- Built: c. 1872
- Architect: B. Hammett Seabury (1909)
- Architectural style: Colonial Revival
- MPS: Downtown Springfield MRA
- NRHP reference No.: 83000760
- Added to NRHP: February 24, 1983

The Patton Building is a historic commercial building located at 15-19 Hampden Street in Springfield, Massachusetts. Built about 1872 with a restyled facade dating to 1909, it is a good example of Georgian Revival commercial architecture, further important for its association with the Pattons, major real estate developers of those periods. The building was added to the National Register of Historic Places on February 24, 1983.

== Description and history ==
The Patton Building is located in downtown Springfield, on the south side of Hampden Street west of Main Street. It is a three-story brick building, sharing party walls with its neighbors. The facade is divided into three parts, articulated by pilasters; the outer two sections have projecting wood-frame window bays on the upper floors, while the center section has three windows set in rectangular openings. A dentillated and modillioned cornice crowns the facade.

The block was built c. 1872, and is noted for its association with William Patton, one of Springfield's most successful businessmen of the late 19th century, and his son William, Junior, a real estate developer. The building was original a factory and warehouse space, but underwent a major conversion in 1909 into office space, at which time it was given a new Georgian Revival facade designed by B. Hammett Seabury, a local architect. For many years the building housed the offices of Durkee, White, and Towne, western Massachusetts's leading civil engineering firm. This firm was responsible for designing large area water supply projects, as well as electrified streetcar systems.

== See also ==
- Patton and Loomis Block, also a Patton building, at Main and Hampden Streets
- National Register of Historic Places listings in Springfield, Massachusetts
- National Register of Historic Places listings in Hampden County, Massachusetts
