= Bicycle Club Building =

- U.S. National Register of Historic Places
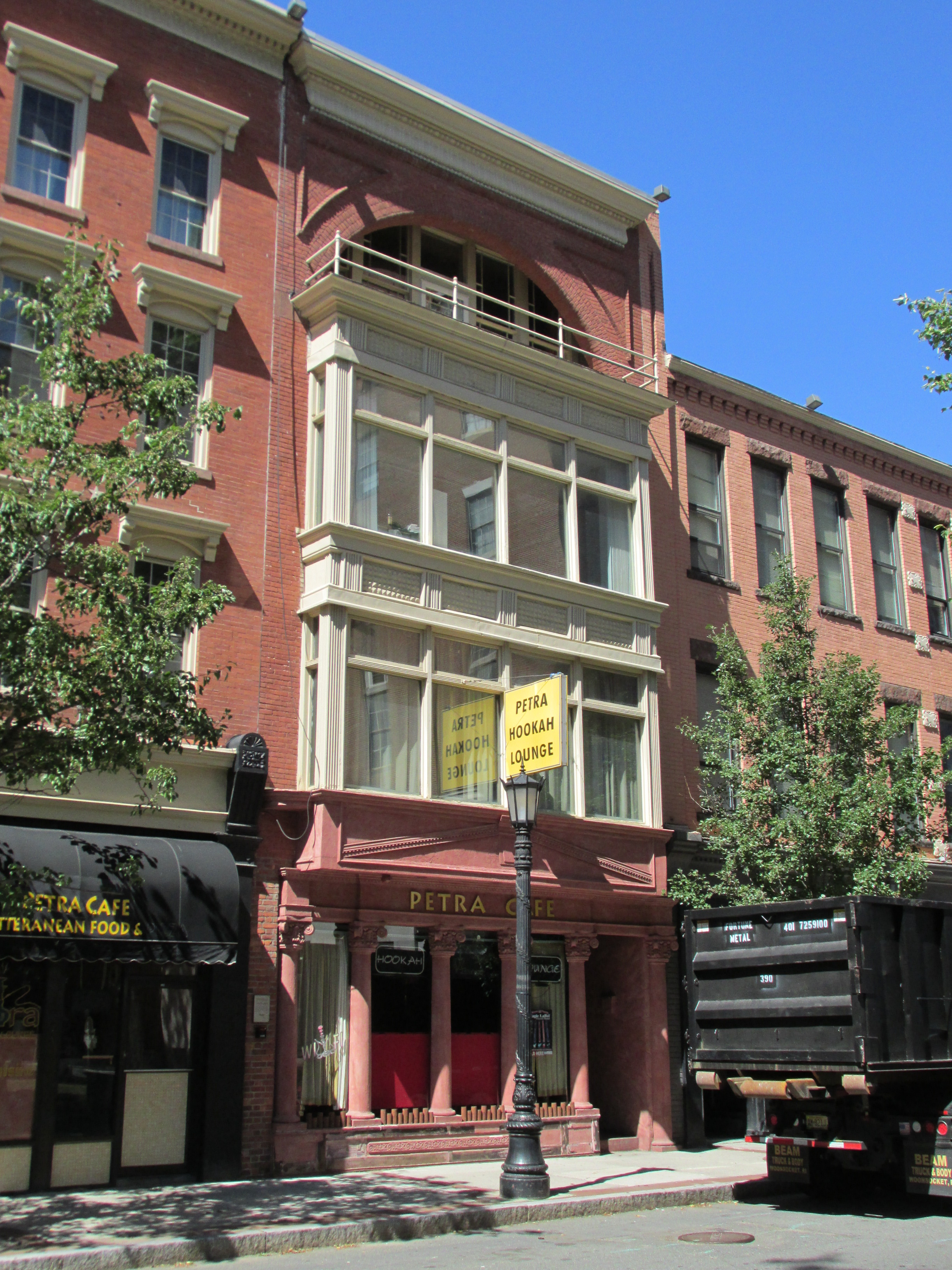
- Bicycle Club Building

- Location within Massachusetts Location within the United States
- Location: Springfield, Massachusetts
- Coordinates: 42°6′18″N 72°35′32″W
- Built: 1891
- MPS: Downtown Springfield MRA
- NRHP reference No.: 83000738
- Added to NRHP: February 24, 1983

The Bicycle Club Building is a historic building at 264-270 Worthington Street in Springfield, Massachusetts. The 1891 four story Romanesque Revival was the first permanent home of the internationally famous Springfield Bicycle Club, which was influential in the development of competitive cycling. Now in other commercial uses, the building was rehabilitated in 1981, and listed on the National Register of Historic Places in 1983.

== Description and history ==
The former Bicycle Club Building is located in downtown Springfield, on the west side of Worthington Street opposite Stearns Square. It is four stories in height, sharing a party wall with the adjacent Wells Block. The ground floor is five bays wide articulated by engaged pillars, with a frieze above that has a gable pattern; the building entrance and the retail entrance for the ground floor are set in a recess in the rightmost bay. The second and third floors are four bays wide, with paneled sections above the windows and fluted pilasters at the sides. The fourth floor width is spanned by a Romanesque arch, and the building is crowned by a projecting metal cornice.

The building was constructed in 1891 for the Springfield Bicycle Club. The ground floor, used as a retail space, has undergone a variety of changes through the years, but the upper floors have retained much of the original form. The club originally leased the ground floor to a bicycle shop, and had club offices and library on the second floor. The third floor housed a game room, and the top floor had an exercise gym. After the rise of the automobile, the club declined in popularity, and the building has seen a succession of uses.

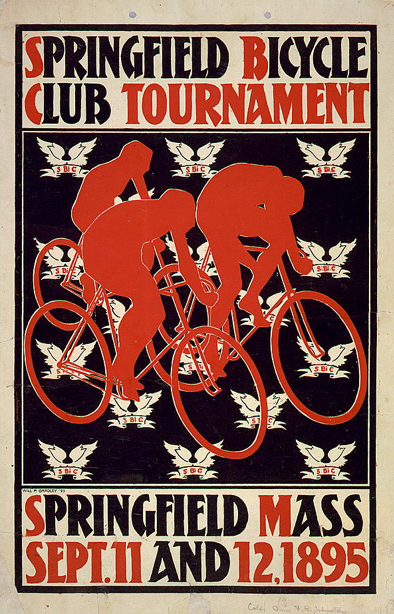
Poster for the Springfield Bicycle Club Tournament, 1895 by Will H. Bradley.

== See also ==
- National Register of Historic Places listings in Springfield, Massachusetts
- National Register of Historic Places listings in Hampden County, Massachusetts
