= Hibernian Block =

- U.S. National Register of Historic Places
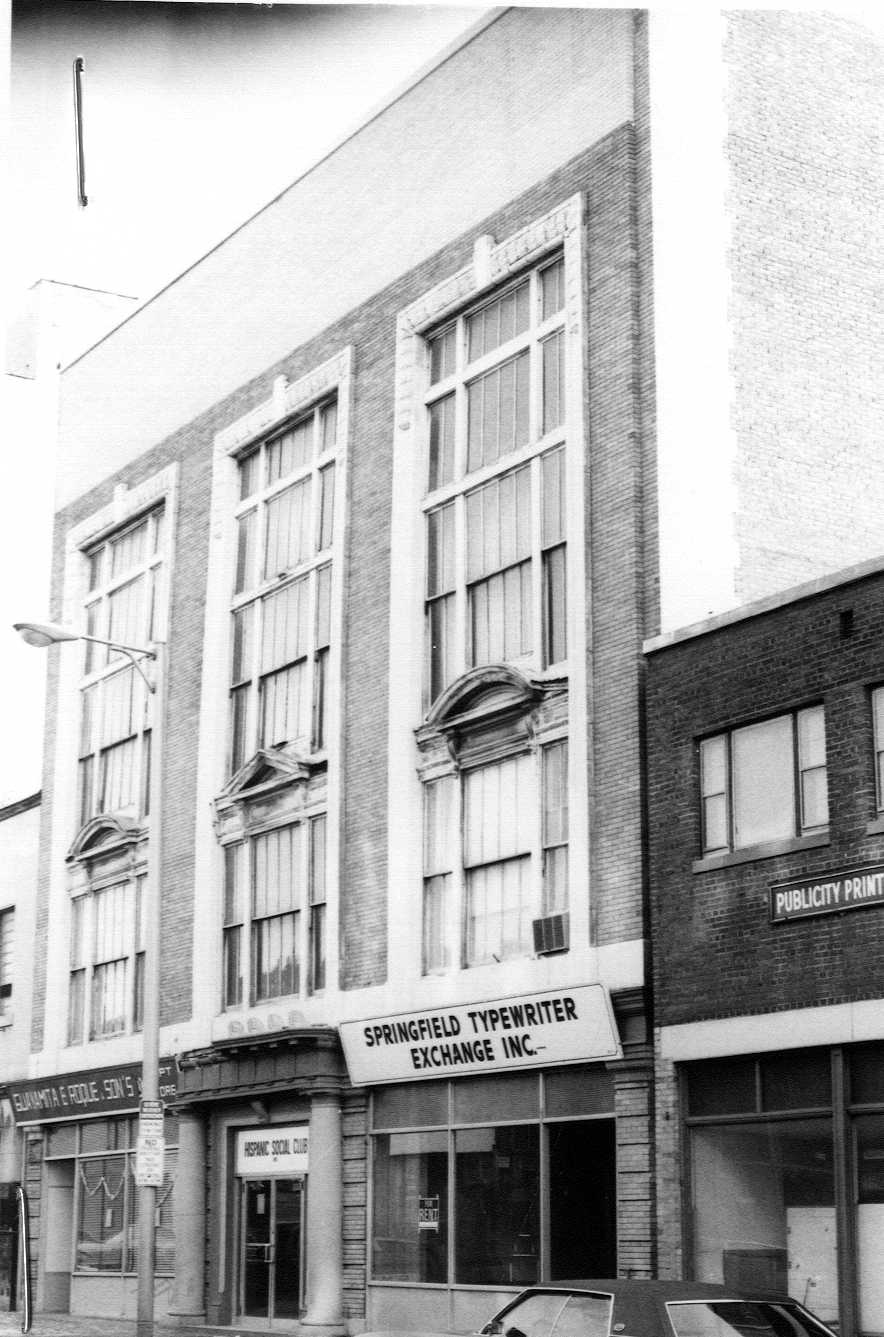

- Location within Massachusetts Location within the United States
- Location: 345-349 Worthington St., Springfield, Massachusetts
- Coordinates: 42°6′21″N 72°35′26″W
- Area: less than one acre
- Built: 1910
- Architectural style: Classical Revival
- MPS: Downtown Springfield MRA
- NRHP reference No.: 83000753
- Added to NRHP: February 24, 1983

The Hibernian Block was a historic commercial building at 345-349 Worthington Street in downtown Springfield, Massachusetts. Built in 1910, it was a distinctive example of Classical Revival architecture, used for many years by a variety of fraternal social organizations. The building was listed on the National Register of Historic Places in 1983 (misspelled as "Hiberian"), and it was demolished sometime thereafter.

== Description and history ==
The Hibernian Block was located in downtown Springfield, on the east side of Worthington Street north of its junction with Dwight Street; the site is now a parking lot. It was a four-story masonry structure with distinctive Classical Revival styling, using brick piers instead of columns between its large glass windows. It was three bays wide, with each of the upper-floor bays housing a three-part window with narrow side windows. The second-floor windows were topped by gabled or segmented-arch pediments.

The block was built in 1910 for the Ancient Order of Hibernians, an Irish Catholic fraternal organization. Its local chapter was established in 1882, and met in the First National Bank Building before they had this block built. The Hibernians used the top floor as a meeting hall, and rented out the lower floors to other businesses. The space was used by the Shriners from 1924 to 1962, and then by the Lebanese American Club. In 1978 it was taken over by the Hispanic Social Club.

== See also ==
- National Register of Historic Places listings in Springfield, Massachusetts
- National Register of Historic Places listings in Hampden County, Massachusetts
