= Outing Park Historic District =

Historic district in Massachusetts, United States

- U.S. National Register of Historic Places
- U.S. Historic district
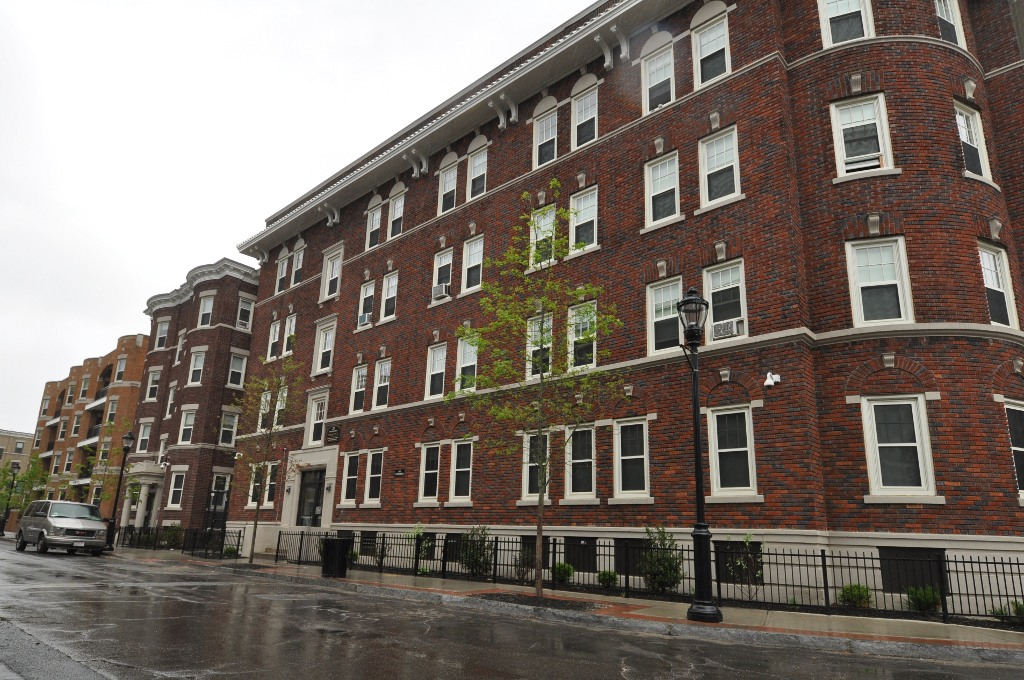

- Location within Massachusetts Location within the United States
- Location: Dwight St. Ext., Springfield, Massachusetts
- Coordinates: 42°5′45″N 72°34′47″W
- Area: 4 acres (1.6 ha)
- Built: 1914-1926
- Architect: Sprague, Harry; Angers, Pierre
- NRHP reference No.: 12000068
- Added to NRHP: March 7, 2012

The Outing Park Historic District, also known as Hollywood, is a residential historic district in the South End of Springfield, Massachusetts. It is a collection of 23 residential apartment blocks that were built between 1914 and 1926 by the prolific building firm, Gagnier & Angers. They occupy a relatively compact area, a few blocks along Niagara, Oswego, and Bayonne Streets, along with a few buildings on Dwight Street Extension and Saratoga Street. The district represents a distinctive and large concentration of period apartment blocks in the city, and was listed on the National Register of Historic Places in 2012.

== Description and history ==
The Outing Park area is in Springfield's South End, on the east side of Main Street roughly between Saratoga and Marble Streets. The district is roughly bisected by Dwight Street Extension, and includes 23 (out of 44 originally built) apartment blocks. All are four stories in height, and are set against the public sidewalks, creating a generally narrow streetscape. The buildings are all stylistically similar, built out of different colors of brick with cast stone trim, with decorative elements from the Georgian Revival and Classical Revival. Typical elements include trim stringcourses between some floors, keystoned window lintels (some set on round-arch blind openings), and bracketed cornices. Entrance treatments vary, including porticos with Tuscan columns and recessed entries with stone surrounds. Interior elements of buildings that survive are often restricted to the public spaces, although many door and window casings survive in some of the living units.

The Outing Park area was one of the largest residential developments of the firm of Gagnier & Angers, a prolific developer who built many apartment blocks in the city during the first three decades of the 20th century, erecting more than 800 living units in the city. This particular development included 44 buildings, whose capacity ranged from 8 to more than 20 units each. This area became the single largest concentration of apartment blocks in the city. During the urban renewal period of the 1970s, the city acquired all of these buildings, and demolished many that were judged to be in too poor condition to keep. Most of these were restricted to one side of the development, so the concentrated streetscape has survived.

== See also ==
- National Register of Historic Places listings in Springfield, Massachusetts
- National Register of Historic Places listings in Hampden County, Massachusetts
