= National Register of Historic Places listings in Springfield, Massachusetts =

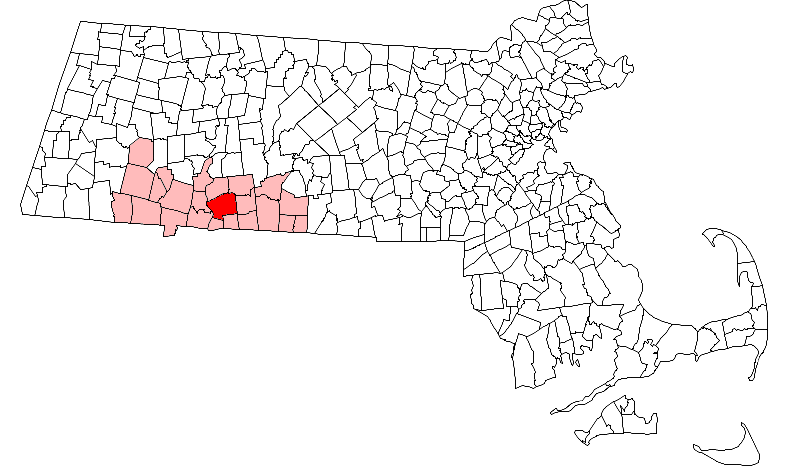
Location of Springfield in Massachusetts

Springfield, Massachusetts, United States, has 92 properties and districts listed on the National Register of Historic Places, including one National Historic Landmark. Latitude and longitude coordinates are provided for many National Register properties and districts; these locations may be seen together in an online map.

This National Park Service list is complete through NPS recent listings posted October 2, 2026.

== Current listings ==
| | Name on the Register | Image | Date listed | Location | City or town | Description |
|---|---|---|---|---|---|---|
| 1 | 1767 Milestones | | April 7, 1971 (#71000084) | Between Boston and Springfield along Old Post Rd. 42°06′25″N 72°34′46″W | Springfield | The one Springfield marker is in storage at the Springfield Armory museum, with a replica placed nearby. Other markers are found in Worcester, Middlesex, Norfolk, and Suffolk counties. |
| 2 | Adams Apartment Building | Adams Apartment Building | September 29, 2015 (#15000660) | 71 Adams St. 42°05′50″N 72°34′48″W | Springfield | |
| 3 | Ames Hill/Crescent Hill District | Ames Hill/Crescent Hill District | May 1, 1974 (#74000368) | Bounded by sections of Central, Maple, Mill, and Pine Sts., Crescent Hill, Ames Hill Drive, and Maple Ct. 42°05′24″N 72°34′37″W | Springfield | |
| 4 | Apremont Triangle Historic District | Apremont Triangle Historic District | May 27, 1983 (#83000735) | Junction of Pearl, Hillman, Bridge, and Chestnut; 42°06′19″N 72°35′21″W | Springfield | |
| 5 | Bangs Block | Bangs Block | February 24, 1983 (#83000736) | 1119 Main St. 42°06′00″N 72°35′10″W | Springfield | |
| 6 | Baystate Corset Block | Baystate Corset Block | February 24, 1983 (#83000737) | 395-405 Dwight St. and 99 Taylor St. 42°06′21″N 72°35′31″W | Springfield | |
| 7 | Belle and Franklin Streets Historic District | Belle and Franklin Streets Historic District | March 2, 1989 (#89000039) | 77-103 Belle St. and 240-298 Franklin St. 42°06′45″N 72°35′31″W | Springfield | |
| 8 | Bicycle Club Building | Bicycle Club Building | February 24, 1983 (#83000738) | 264-270 Worthington St. 42°06′18″N 72°35′32″W | Springfield | |
| 9 | Elias Brookings School | Elias Brookings School | May 4, 2023 (#100008959) | 367 Hancock St. 42°05′57″N 72°34′00″W | Springfield | |
| 10 | Burbach Block | Burbach Block | February 24, 1983 (#83000739) | 1113-1115 Main St. 42°06′00″N 72°35′09″W | Springfield | |
| 11 | The Calhoun Apartments | The Calhoun Apartments | November 5, 2009 (#09000881) | 1391-1399 Dwight St. and 85 Jefferson Ave. 42°06′58″N 72°36′13″W | Springfield | |
| 12 | Carlton House Block | Carlton House Block | February 24, 1983 (#83000741) | 9-13 Hampden St. 42°06′13″N 72°35′40″W | Springfield | |
| 13 | Chapin National Bank Building | Chapin National Bank Building | February 24, 1983 (#83000742) | 1675-1677 Main St. 42°06′16″N 72°35′42″W | Springfield | |
| 14 | Colonial Block | Colonial Block | February 24, 1983 (#83000743) | 1139-55 Main St. 42°06′01″N 72°35′11″W | Springfield | |
| 15 | Court Square Historic District | Court Square Historic District | May 2, 1974 (#74000370) | Bounded by Main, State, Broadway, Pynchon Sts. and City HallPl. 42°06′02″N 72°35′22″W | Springfield | |
| 16 | Cutler and Porter Block | Cutler and Porter Block | February 24, 1983 (#83000744) | 109 Lyman St. 42°06′24″N 72°35′31″W | Springfield | |
| 17 | Downtown Springfield Railroad District | Downtown Springfield Railroad District | May 27, 1983 (#83000745) | Roughly bounded by Lyman, Main, Murray, and Spring Sts. 42°06′31″N 72°35′25″W | Springfield | |
| 18 | Driscoll's Block | Driscoll's Block | February 24, 1983 (#83000746) | 211-13 Worthington St. 42°06′14″N 72°35′33″W | Springfield | |
| 19 | Ethel Apartment House | Ethel Apartment House | March 6, 1987 (#87000353) | 70 Patton St. 42°06′54″N 72°35′57″W | Springfield | |
| 20 | Evans Court Apartment Building | Evans Court Apartment Building | September 29, 2015 (#15000661) | 22-24 Winthrop St. 42°05′54″N 72°34′56″W | Springfield | |
| 21 | Federal Square Historic District | Federal Square Historic District | March 15, 2019 (#100003546) | 1 Federal St. 42°06′33″N 72°34′40″W | Springfield | |
| 22 | First Church of Christ, Congregational | First Church of Christ, Congregational | February 1, 1972 (#72000135) | 50 Elm St. 42°06′03″N 72°35′23″W | Springfield | |
| 23 | Fitzgerald's Stearns Square Block | Fitzgerald's Stearns Square Block | February 24, 1983 (#83000747) | 300-308 Bridge St. 42°06′15″N 72°35′30″W | Springfield | Apparently demolished. |
| 24 | Forest Park Heights Historic District | Forest Park Heights Historic District | August 31, 1982 (#82004942) | Off MA 21; 42°05′04″N 72°34′19″W | Springfield | |
| 25 | French Congregational Church | French Congregational Church | February 24, 1983 (#83004288) | Union St. 42°05′55″N 72°35′07″W | Springfield | Moved from Bliss Street in 2016 to make way for MGM Springfield casino. |
| 26 | Fuller Block | Fuller Block | February 24, 1983 (#83000748) | 1531-1545 Main St. 42°06′12″N 72°35′33″W | Springfield | |
| 27 | Guenther & Handel's Block | Guenther & Handel's Block | February 24, 1983 (#83000749) | 7-9 Stockbridge St. 42°06′02″N 72°35′11″W | Springfield | |
| 28 | Gunn and Hubbard Blocks | Gunn and Hubbard Blocks | December 3, 1980 (#80000474) | 463-477 State St. 42°06′27″N 72°34′40″W | Springfield | |
| 29 | Hampden County Courthouse | Hampden County Courthouse | February 1, 1972 (#72000134) | Elm St. 42°06′01″N 72°35′20″W | Springfield | |
| 30 | Hampden Savings Bank | Hampden Savings Bank | February 24, 1983 (#83000750) | 1665 Main St. 42°06′16″N 72°35′40″W | Springfield | |
| 31 | Hancock Apartment Building | Hancock Apartment Building | September 29, 2015 (#15000662) | 116-118 Hancock, 130 Tyler Sts. 42°06′24″N 72°34′07″W | Springfield | |
| 32 | Haynes Hotel Waters Building | Haynes Hotel Waters Building | February 24, 1983 (#83000751) | 1386-1402 Main St. 42°06′08″N 72°35′26″W | Springfield | |
| 33 | Henking Hotel and Cafe | Henking Hotel and Cafe | February 24, 1983 (#83000752) | 15-21 Lyman St. 42°06′30″N 72°35′39″W | Springfield | Demolished. |
| 34 | Hibernian Block | Hibernian Block | February 24, 1983 (#83000753) | 345-349 Worthington St. 42°06′21″N 72°35′26″W | Springfield | Listed on register as "Hiberian Block"; building has been demolished. |
| 35 | Hooker Apartments | Hooker Apartments | July 29, 2013 (#13000596) | 2772-2786 Main & 7 Greenwich Sts. 42°06′58″N 72°36′25″W | Springfield | |
| 36 | Indian Orchard Branch Library | Indian Orchard Branch Library | February 26, 1999 (#99000258) | 44 Oak St. 42°09′33″N 72°30′17″W | Springfield | |
| 37 | Ivernia Apartment Building | Ivernia Apartment Building | September 29, 2015 (#15000663) | 91-93 Pine St. 42°06′08″N 72°34′22″W | Springfield | |
| 38 | Kennedy-Worthington Blocks | Kennedy-Worthington Blocks | June 14, 1979 (#79000347) | 1585-1623 Main St. and 166-190 Worthington St. 42°06′15″N 72°35′36″W | Springfield | |
| 39 | Kenwyn Apartments | Kenwyn Apartments | November 14, 1994 (#94001467) | 6 Kenwood Park and 413-415 Belmont Ave. 42°05′14″N 72°33′47″W | Springfield | |
| 40 | Laurel Hall | Laurel Hall | March 6, 1987 (#87000355) | 72-74 Patton St. 42°06′36″N 72°35′53″W | Springfield | |
| 41 | Maple-Union Corners | Maple-Union Corners | April 26, 1976 (#76000243) | 77, 83, 76-78, 80-84 Maple St. 42°06′05″N 72°34′56″W | Springfield | |
| 42 | Masonic Temple | Masonic Temple | November 10, 1983 (#83003979) | 339-341 State St. 42°06′20″N 72°34′52″W | Springfield | |
| 43 | McIntosh Building | McIntosh Building | February 24, 1983 (#83000754) | 158-64 Chestnut St. 42°06′21″N 72°35′25″W | Springfield | |
| 44 | McKinney Building | McKinney Building | February 24, 1983 (#83000755) | 1121-27 Main St. 42°06′00″N 72°35′10″W | Springfield | |
| 45 | McKnight District | McKnight District | April 26, 1976 (#76000255) | Roughly bounded by Penn Central, State St., the Armory, and includes both sides of Campus Pl., and Dartmouth St. 42°06′52″N 72°34′19″W | Springfield | |
| 46 | Memorial Square District | Memorial Square District | August 29, 1977 (#77000180) | Main and Plainfield Sts. 42°06′37″N 72°36′10″W | Springfield | |
| 47 | Mills-Hale-Owen Blocks | Mills-Hale-Owen Blocks | October 31, 1985 (#85003424) | 959-991 Main St. 42°05′56″N 72°35′06″W | Springfield | Damaged in the 2011 New England tornado outbreak and subsequently demolished. |
| 48 | Mills-Stebbins Villa | Mills-Stebbins Villa | October 15, 1973 (#73000299) | 3 Crescent Hill; 42°05′27″N 72°34′41″W | Springfield | |
| 49 | Milton-Bradley Company | Milton-Bradley Company | February 24, 1983 (#83000756) | Park, Cross, and Willow Sts. 42°06′01″N 72°35′01″W | Springfield | |
| 50 | Morgan Block | Morgan Block | May 27, 1983 (#83000757) | 313-333 Bridge St. 42°06′15″N 72°35′27″W | Springfield | |
| 51 | Myrtle Street School | Myrtle Street School | January 3, 1985 (#85000024) | 64 Myrtle St. 42°09′30″N 72°30′25″W | Springfield | |
| 52 | New Bay Diner Restaurant | New Bay Diner Restaurant | December 4, 2003 (#03001244) | 950 Bay St. 42°07′51″N 72°33′17″W | Springfield | |
| 53 | Olmsted-Hixon-Albion Block | Olmsted-Hixon-Albion Block | February 24, 1983 (#83000758) | 1645-1659 Main St. 42°06′15″N 72°35′40″W | Springfield | |
| 54 | Outing Park Historic District | Outing Park Historic District | March 7, 2012 (#12000068) | Roughly bounded by Saratoga, Niagara, Oswego, & Bayoone Sts. 42°05′45″N 72°34′47″W | Springfield | |
| 55 | Patton and Loomis Block | Patton and Loomis Block | February 24, 1983 (#83000759) | 1628-40 Main St. 42°06′14″N 72°35′40″W | Springfield | |
| 56 | Patton Building | Patton Building | February 24, 1983 (#83000760) | 15-19 Hampden St. 42°06′13″N 72°35′40″W | Springfield | |
| 57 | Produce Exchange Building | Produce Exchange Building | February 24, 1983 (#83000761) | 194-206 Chestnut and 115-125 Lyman St. 42°06′25″N 72°35′30″W | Springfield | |
| 58 | Quadrangle-Mattoon Street Historic District | Quadrangle-Mattoon Street Historic District | May 8, 1974 (#74000371) | Bounded by Chestnut St. to the W, State St. to the S, and includes properties on Mattoon, Salem, Edwards and Elliot Sts. 42°06′16″N 72°35′10″W | Springfield | |
| 59 | Radding Building | Radding Building | February 24, 1983 (#83000762) | 143-147 State St. 42°06′04″N 72°35′13″W | Springfield | |
| 60 | Republican Block | Republican Block | January 26, 1978 (#78000447) | 1365 Main St. 42°06′08″N 72°35′25″W | Springfield | |
| 61 | The St. James Apartments | The St. James Apartments | January 21, 2020 (#100003941) | 573 State St.: Five Oak St. 42°06′33″N 72°34′27″W | Springfield | |
| 62 | Julia Sanderson Theater | Julia Sanderson Theater | May 10, 1979 (#79000348) | 1676-1708 Main St. 42°06′14″N 72°35′44″W | Springfield | |
| 63 | Smith Carriage Company District | Smith Carriage Company District | February 24, 1983 (#83000763) | Bounded by Main, Peabody, Willow, and Park Sts. 42°06′00″N 72°35′05″W | Springfield | |
| 64 | Smith's Building | Smith's Building | February 24, 1983 (#83000764) | 201-207 Worthington St. 42°06′14″N 72°35′34″W | Springfield | |
| 65 | South Congregational Church | South Congregational Church | April 30, 1976 (#76000245) | 45 Maple St. 42°06′08″N 72°35′01″W | Springfield | |
| 66 | South Main Street School | South Main Street School | January 3, 1985 (#85000025) | 11 Acushnet Ave. 42°05′31″N 72°34′46″W | Springfield | |
| 67 | Springfield Armory National Historic Site | Springfield Armory National Historic Site | October 15, 1966 (#66000898) | Armory Sq. 42°06′29″N 72°34′54″W | Springfield | |
| 68 | Springfield District Court | Springfield District Court | February 24, 1983 (#83000765) | 1600 E. Columbus Ave. 42°06′03″N 72°35′29″W | Springfield | |
| 69 | Springfield Fire & Marine Insurance Co. | Springfield Fire & Marine Insurance Co. | February 24, 1983 (#83000766) | 195 State St. 42°06′06″N 72°35′11″W | Springfield | |
| 70 | Springfield Safe Deposit and Trust Company | Springfield Safe Deposit and Trust Company | November 8, 2003 (#03001118) | 127-131 State St. 42°06′05″N 72°35′12″W | Springfield | |
| 71 | Springfield Steam Power Company Block | Springfield Steam Power Company Block | February 24, 1983 (#83000767) | 51-59 Taylor St. 42°06′18″N 72°35′33″W | Springfield | |
| 72 | St. John's Congregational Church & Parsonage-Parish for Working Girls | St. John's Congregational Church & Parsonage-Parish for Working Girls | June 28, 2016 (#16000140) | 69 Hancock St. 42°06′29″N 72°34′07″W | Springfield | |
| 73 | St. Joseph's Church | St. Joseph's Church | February 24, 1983 (#83002999) | Howard St. and E. Columbus Ave. 42°05′52″N 72°35′16″W | Springfield | Demolished in 2008. |
| 74 | Stacy Building | Stacy Building | May 27, 1983 (#83000768) | 41-43 Taylor St. 42°06′17″N 72°35′35″W | Springfield | |
| 75 | State Armory | State Armory | May 3, 1976 (#76000254) | 29 Howard St. 42°05′55″N 72°35′12″W | Springfield | Training hall destroyed in 2011 New England tornado outbreak. |
| 76 | Stearns Building | Stearns Building | February 24, 1983 (#83000770) | 289-309 Bridge St. 42°06′14″N 72°35′28″W | Springfield | |
| 77 | Trinity Block | Trinity Block | February 24, 1983 (#83000771) | 266-84 Bridge St. 42°06′15″N 72°35′35″W | Springfield | |
| 78 | Union Trust Company Building | Union Trust Company Building | January 9, 1978 (#78000448) | 1351 Main St. 42°06′08″N 72°35′22″W | Springfield | |
| 79 | United Electric Co. Building | United Electric Co. Building | February 24, 1983 (#83000772) | 73 State St. 42°06′00″N 72°35′18″W | Springfield | Building mostly demolished to make way for MGM Springfield casino; building facade was retained. |
| 80 | Upper Worthington Historic District | Upper Worthington Historic District | March 31, 1983 (#83000773) | Worthington, Federal, Summit and Armory Sts. 42°06′47″N 72°34′52″W | Springfield | |
| 81 | The Van der Heyden | | September 2, 2025 (#100012170) | 770-780 State Street; 42°06′40″N 72°33′57″W | Springfield | |
| 82 | The Verona Apartments | The Verona Apartments | November 5, 2009 (#09000882) | 1245-1255 Dwight St. and 6-10 Allendale St. 42°06′51″N 72°36′07″W | Springfield | |
| 83 | W C A Boarding House | W C A Boarding House | February 24, 1983 (#83000776) | 19 Bliss St. 42°05′59″N 72°35′14″W | Springfield | Demolished to make way for MGM Springfield casino. |
| 84 | Walker Building | Walker Building | February 24, 1983 (#83000775) | 1228-1244 Main St. 42°06′03″N 72°35′17″W | Springfield | |
| 85 | Wason-Springfield Steam Power Blocks | Wason-Springfield Steam Power Blocks | June 19, 1979 (#79000349) | 27-43 Lyman St. and 26-50 Taylor St. 42°06′17″N 72°35′37″W | Springfield | |
| 86 | Water Shops Armory | Water Shops Armory | December 3, 1980 (#80000476) | 1 Allen St. 42°05′43″N 72°33′48″W | Springfield | |
| 87 | Wells Block | Wells Block | February 24, 1983 (#83000777) | 250-264 Worthington St. 42°06′18″N 72°35′35″W | Springfield | |
| 88 | Whitcomb Warehouse | Whitcomb Warehouse | February 24, 1983 (#83004291) | 32-34 Hampden St. 42°06′13″N 72°35′44″W | Springfield | |
| 89 | The Wigglesworth Building | The Wigglesworth Building | January 21, 2020 (#100003943) | 23 Oak St.; 71 Lillian St. 42°06′31″N 72°34′26″W | Springfield | |
| 90 | Willy's Overland Block | Willy's Overland Block | February 24, 1983 (#83000778) | 151-157 Chestnut and 10-20 Winter Sts. 42°06′21″N 72°35′24″W | Springfield | |
| 91 | Winchester Square Historic District | Winchester Square Historic District | May 10, 1979 (#79000350) | U.S. 20; 42°06′38″N 72°33′45″W | Springfield | |
| 92 | Worthy Hotel | Worthy Hotel | February 24, 1983 (#83000779) | 1571 Main St. 42°06′13″N 72°35′34″W | Springfield | |

== See also ==
- List of National Historic Landmarks in Massachusetts
- National Register of Historic Places listings in Hampden County, Massachusetts
