= Henking Hotel and Cafe =

- U.S. National Register of Historic Places
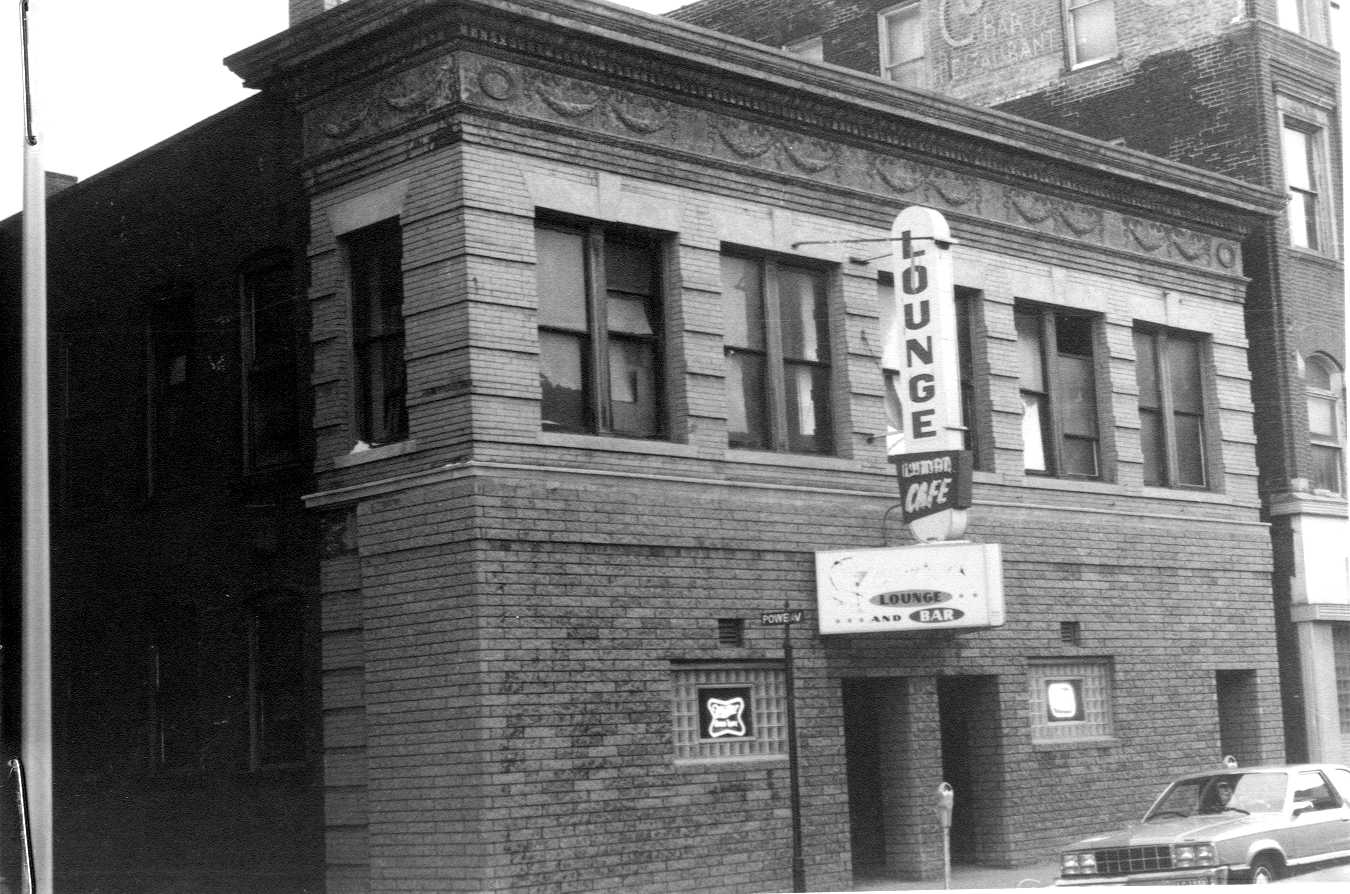
- The cafe portion of the building, c. 1979-82

- Location within Massachusetts Location within the United States
- Location: 16-21 Lyman St., Springfield, Massachusetts
- Coordinates: 42°6′20″N 72°35′35.6″W
- Area: less than one acre
- Built: 1899
- Architect: Becker, William
- Architectural style: Colonial Revival
- MPS: Downtown Springfield MRA
- NRHP reference No.: 83000752
- Added to NRHP: February 24, 1983

The Henking Hotel and Cafe was a historic building at 15-21 Lyman Street in Springfield, Massachusetts. Built in two stages in 1899 and 1909, it was a good example of a turn-of-the-century accommodation for railroad travelers in the city, notable for its establishment by some of area's early German immigrants. The building was listed on the National Register of Historic Places in 1983, and demolished some time thereafter.

== Description and history ==
The Henking Hotel and Cafe were two adjacent buildings on the east side of Lyman Street, at its junction with Kaynor Street. The hotel building was four stories in height, with Georgian Revival styling in brick, while the adjacent cafe space was a two-story brick building, with glass-block windows flanking the entrance on the ground floor, and pairs of windows on the second level, which housed a ballroom. That buildings cornice was designed to match that of the hotel.

The hotel building was built in 1880 for Gustave and Elizabeth Gruendler, German immigrants who had operated hotels elsewhere in the city for some time, and who were among the city's early German immigrant arrivals. Upon their death the building was taken over by Henry Henking, who had worked for the Gruendlers. He changed the name of the hotel and remodeled its facade in a Georgian Revival style. His son Gus took over the business upon his death in 1906, and further expanded the business, building the adjacent banquet space. The hotel was strategically located opposite an entrance to the railroad station, and the business of the small family-run hotel was good despite competition from larger hotels nearby.

== See also ==
- National Register of Historic Places listings in Springfield, Massachusetts
- National Register of Historic Places listings in Hampden County, Massachusetts
