= Upper Worthington Historic District =

Historic district in Massachusetts, United States

- U.S. National Register of Historic Places
- U.S. Historic district
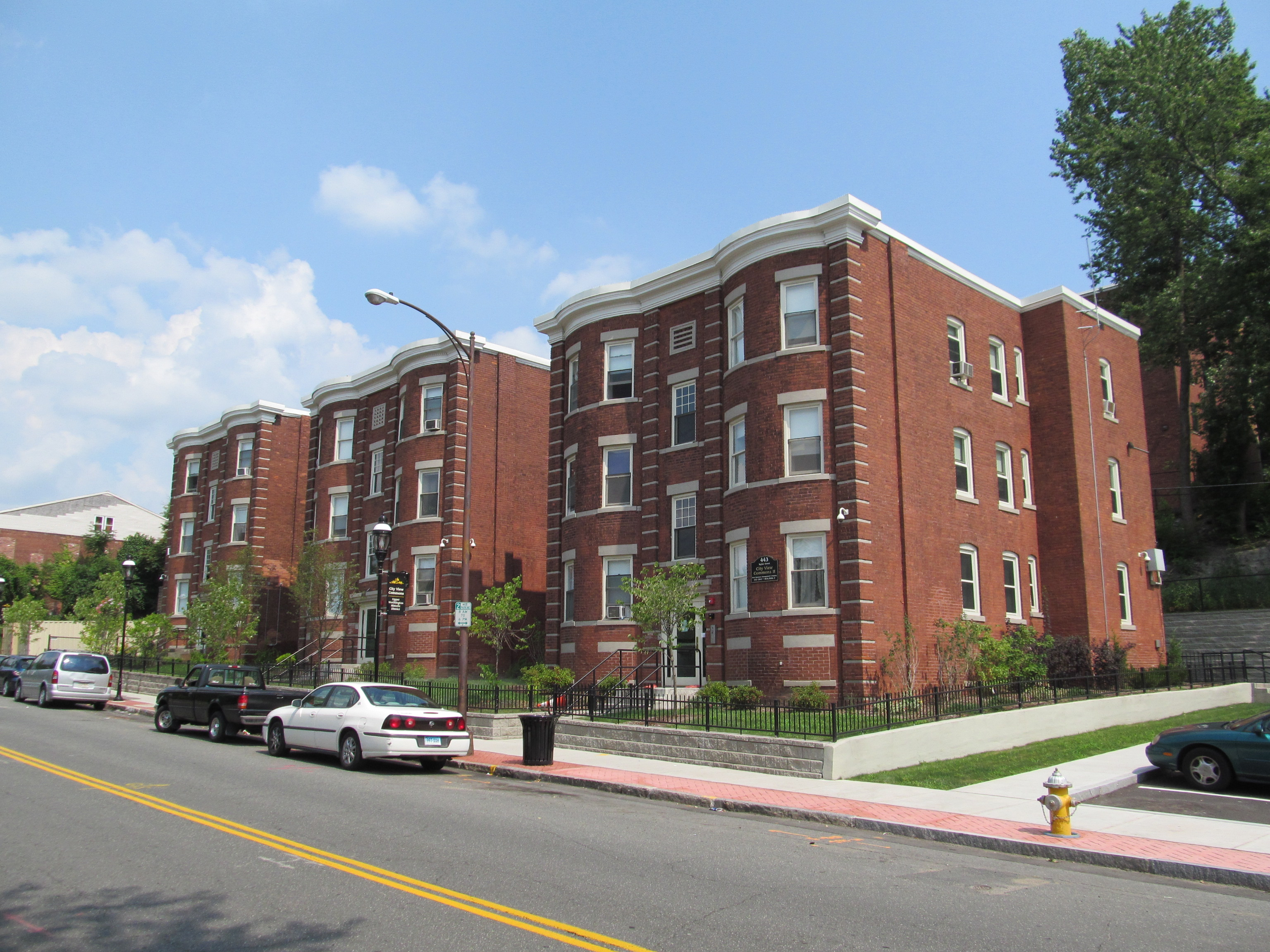
- City View Commons

- Location within Massachusetts Location within the United States
- Location: Springfield, Massachusetts
- Coordinates: 42°6′47″N 72°34′52″W
- Area: 9 acres (3.6 ha)
- Built: 1908
- Architect: Gagnier & Angers et al.
- Architectural style: Colonial Revival, Moderne, Tudor Revival
- NRHP reference No.: 83000773
- Added to NRHP: March 31, 1983

The Upper Worthington Historic District of Springfield, Massachusetts encompasses a collection of visually cohesive residential apartment blocks that represent one of the largest residential developments in the city dating to the first three decades of the 20th century. It is centered on a portion of Worthington Street, a major east-west road in the city, between Armory Street and Summit Street, and includes 33 buildings on those three streets as well as Federal and Taylor Streets, near their junctions with either Worthington or Federal. Most of the contributing buildings are four story brick buildings with Georgian detailing and stone trim. The district was first listed on the National Register of Historic Places in 1983, including 28 buildings; the district was expanded in 1992 to add the five buildings on Taylor Street.

The district is located on the northern side of the plateau that also houses the Springfield Armory. In the mid-19th century this area was developed with summer estates, which eventually succumbed to development pressures for higher density housing late in the 19th century. The Upper Worthington area was originally the estate of Horace Kibbe, which the firm of Gagnier & Angers offered to buy in 1908. Gagnier & Angers was a partnership of two French Canadian immigrants, who were one of the city's major real estate development and construction firms in the early 20th century. When the estate was finally partitioned in 1912, they purchased the largest part of it, and proceeded to build out the area over the next twenty years. Most of the residential blocks in the district were built either by that firm, or by one established by Albert Gagnier and Larry Angers, sons of its principals. The development was the largest of its type in the city at the time, and preserves a distinctive streetscape from the period.

== See also ==
- National Register of Historic Places listings in Springfield, Massachusetts
- National Register of Historic Places listings in Hampden County, Massachusetts
