= Belle and Franklin Streets Historic District =

Historic district in Massachusetts, United States

- U.S. National Register of Historic Places
- U.S. Historic district
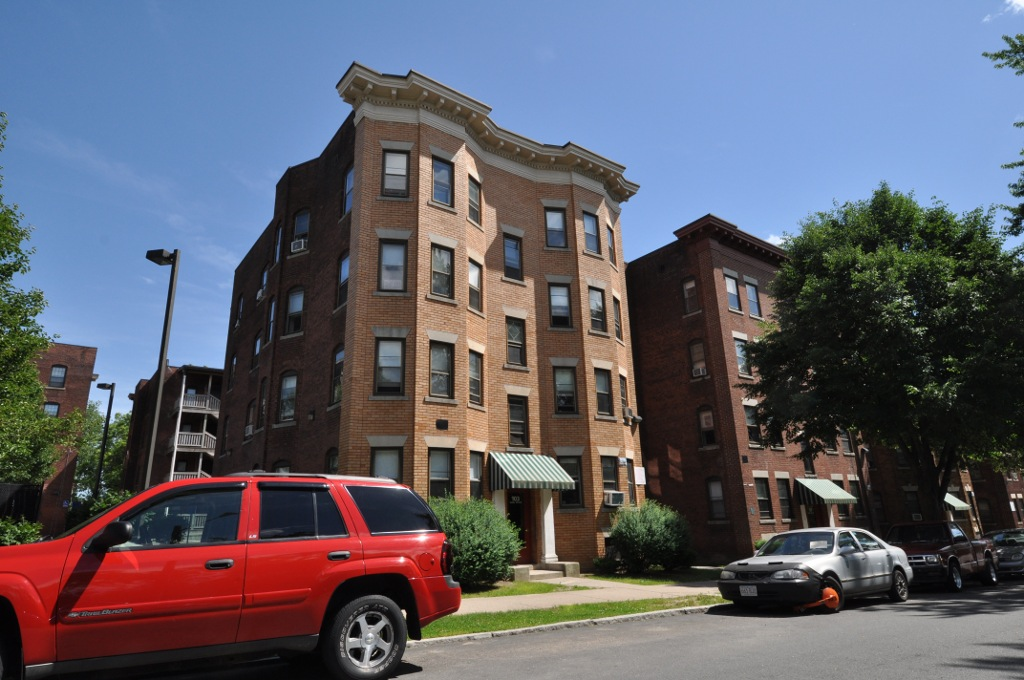
- Belle Street housing

- Location within Massachusetts Location within the United States
- Location: Springfield, Massachusetts
- Coordinates: 42°6′45″N 72°35′31″W
- Area: 2.1 acres (0.85 ha)
- Built: 1862
- Architect: Kinsman, Louis G.H.; Fredette, William
- Architectural style: Classical Revival
- NRHP reference No.: 89000039
- Added to NRHP: March 2, 1989

The Belle and Franklin Streets Historic District is a residential historic district encompassing the surviving portions of 1914-16 apartment house development on the northwest side of downtown Springfield, Massachusetts. The properties are at 77—103 Belle St. and 240—298 Franklin Street, and were listed on the National Register of Historic Places in 1989.

== Description and history ==
The Belle and Franklin Street area was developed by local builder William Lay between 1914 and 1916. It includes a series of almost entirely residential buildings along Belle and Franklin Streets, two streets that parallel each other near Interstate 291, north of Springfield's downtown. Lay built 16 apartment houses, half of which were four story brick construction, with the others being three story wood-frame structures. The district also includes a mixed residential/commercial building Lay built, and an early (1862) frame house. The development is remarkably intact despite the construction of I-291 nearby: only one of Lay's buildings, another mixed use building, has been demolished.

The area now covered by this district was first developed as a series of modest estates and stylish homes in the 1850s. These properties were subdivided and built more densely in the late 19th century, when streetcar lines made the area convenient for workers employed downtown. The property developed by Lay was originally an estate owned by Samuel Brooks, a doctor, and then George Fisk, president of the Wason Manufacturing Company. Fisk sold his property in 1913 to John Lester, who had sold properties in the area to William Lay, an English-born real estate developer and builder. Lay first proposed subdivision of the area in February 1913, and received building permits in December for the first building, one of the six-unit wood-frame buildings on Franklin Street. The brick eight-unit buildings on Belle Street were built in 1915. The building at 296 Franklin Street, also built during this time, has twelve units, and includes retail spaces on the ground floor.

== See also ==
- National Register of Historic Places listings in Springfield, Massachusetts
- National Register of Historic Places listings in Hampden County, Massachusetts
