= Walker Building (Springfield, Massachusetts) =

- U.S. National Register of Historic Places
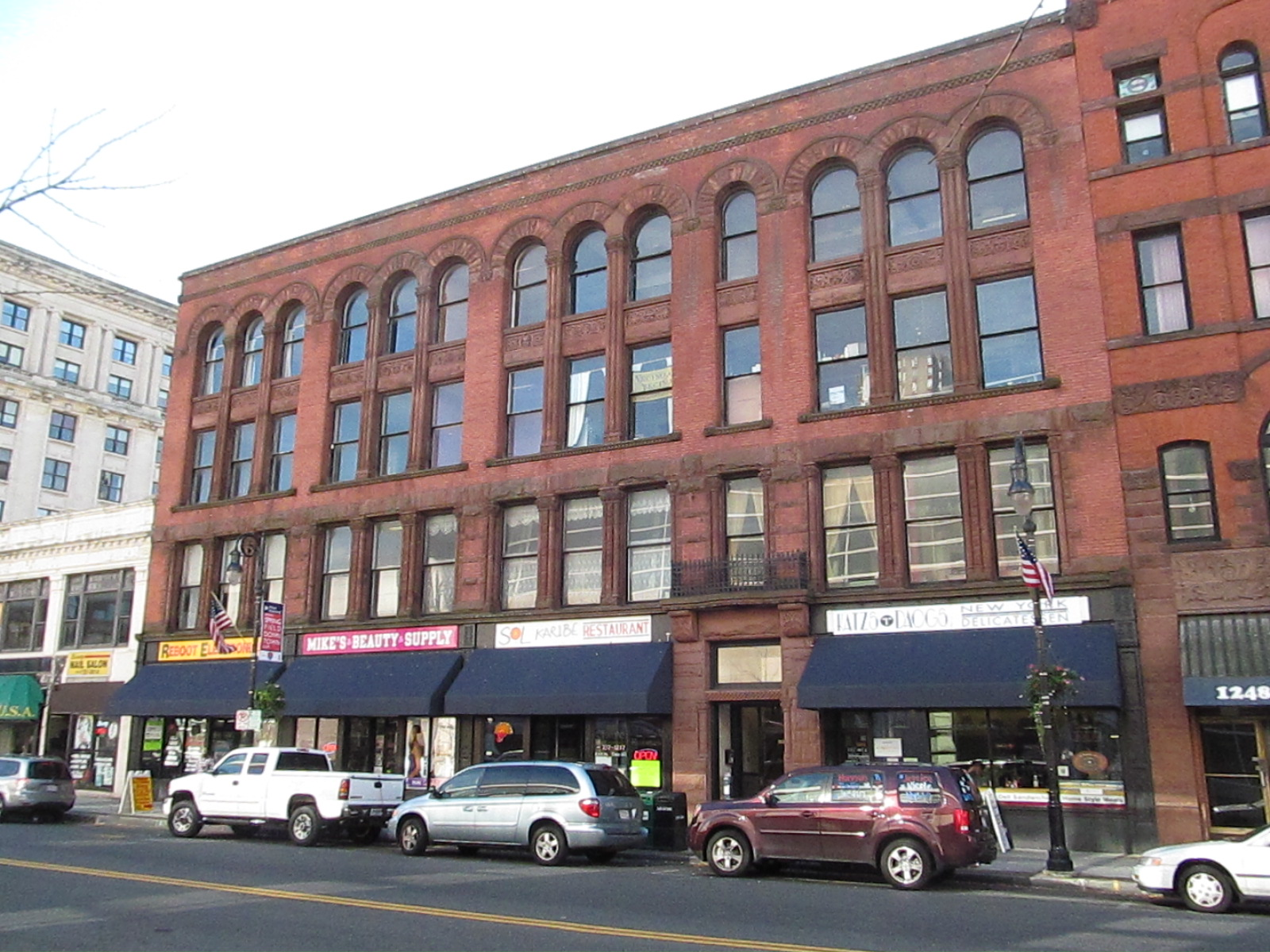
- Walker Building

- Location within Massachusetts Location within the United States
- Location: 1228-1244 Main St., Springfield, Massachusetts
- Coordinates: 42°6′3″N 72°35′17″W
- Area: less than one acre
- Built: 1898
- Architect: Fuller & Delano
- Architectural style: Romanesque Revival
- MPS: Downtown Springfield MRA
- NRHP reference No.: 83000775
- Added to NRHP: February 24, 1983

The Walker Building is a historic commercial building at 1228-1244 Main Street in downtown Springfield, Massachusetts. Built in 1898, it is one of the best examples of Richardsonian Romanesque design in the city. It was listed on the National Register of Historic Places in 1983.

== Description and history ==
The Walker Building is located in downtown Springfield, on the east side of Main Street between State and Elm Streets. It is a four-story masonry structure, finished in red brick with brownstone trim. The facade is thirteen bays wide, with four storefronts three bays wide, and a single off-center bay housing main building entrance. The entrance is framed by rustic brownstone, with a half-height column at the corner. The second-floor windows are flanked by engaged columns, with narrow bands of rustic brownstone quoining. The upper two floors have windows grouped in threes matching the storefronts below, with columns between the windows in each group, and a rounded arch at the top. A band of decorative brickwork runs below a simple cornice.

The building was built in 1898 to a design by the prominent Worcester architectural firm Delano & Fuller. When built, it was five stories high; the top floor has since been removed. The lot on which it was built previously housed the city's first brick hotel, which was owned by T.M. Walker. Walker was also a local manufacturer and retailer of building supplies, including architectural woodwork and paint. The building, despite alterations, has retained much of its original facade.

== See also ==
- National Register of Historic Places listings in Springfield, Massachusetts
- National Register of Historic Places listings in Hampden County, Massachusetts
