= Springfield Safe Deposit and Trust Company =

- U.S. National Register of Historic Places
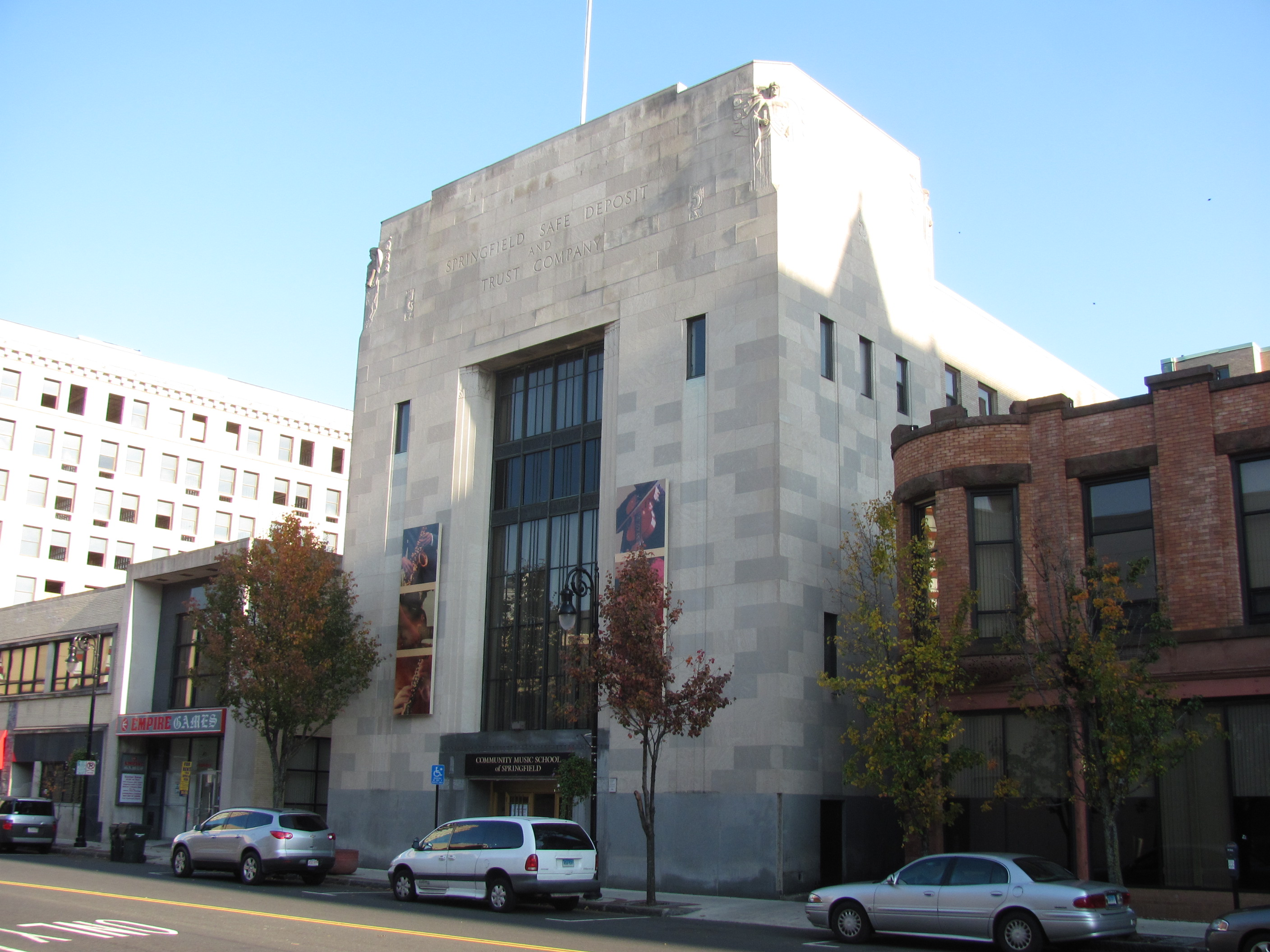
- Springfield Safe Deposit and Trust

- Location within Massachusetts Location within the United States
- Location: 127-131 State St., Springfield, Massachusetts
- Coordinates: 42°6′5″N 72°35′12″W
- Area: less than one acre
- Built: 1933
- Architect: James, Thomas M.; Stephens, A.E. Co.
- Architectural style: Art Deco
- NRHP reference No.: 03001118
- Added to NRHP: November 8, 2003

The Springfield Safe Deposit and Trust Company is a historic building at 127-131 State Street in Springfield, Massachusetts. Built in 1933, it is a prominent local example of Art Deco architecture, including many well-preserved interior features. Closed by the Trust Company successor Fleet Bank, it was donated to The Community Music School of Springfield. The building was listed on the National Register of Historic Places in 2003.

== Description and history ==
The former Springfield Safe Deposit and Trust Company is located in downtown Springfield, occupying a parcel that fronts on State Street between Willow and Main Streets, which extends all the way back to Stockbridge Street. The building is four stories in height, with a steel frame finished in a combination of stone, concrete, and brick. The front facade is faced in limestone, and rises well above the rest of the building, giving it a monumental appearance on State Street. The main feature of the facade is a central arch, which houses the main entrance and windows above. The building corners are adorned with figures near the top of the facade. The main entrance now provides access only to the upper floors of the building, while the building's principal occupant, the Community Music School, uses a side entrance. The interior retains many original finishes and features, including bank vaults, marble floors, limestone walls, and a mural of the George Washington Bridge in the main lobby. The lobby also boasts stonework depicting symbols of thrift and prudence from the animal world.

The Springfield Safe Deposit and Trust Company was founded in 1886, originally occupying premises on Main Street. Experiencing rapid growth, it moved in 1908 to the newly built Massachusetts Mutual Life Insurance Company building at State and Main. By 1930 it had once again outgrown its space, and the present building was constructed in 1933 to make a permanent home. The bank directors deliberately chose to hire many local workmen for its construction, which took place at the height of the Great Depression. The building was designed by Thomas James of Boston, who was by then well known for many bank commissions. The bank was eventually acquired by Fleet Bank through a series of corporate mergers and acquisitions, and the building was closed in the 1990s. The bank donated the building to the Community Music School in 1996.

== See also ==
- National Register of Historic Places listings in Springfield, Massachusetts
- National Register of Historic Places listings in Hampden County, Massachusetts
