= Ivernia Apartment Building =

- U.S. National Register of Historic Places
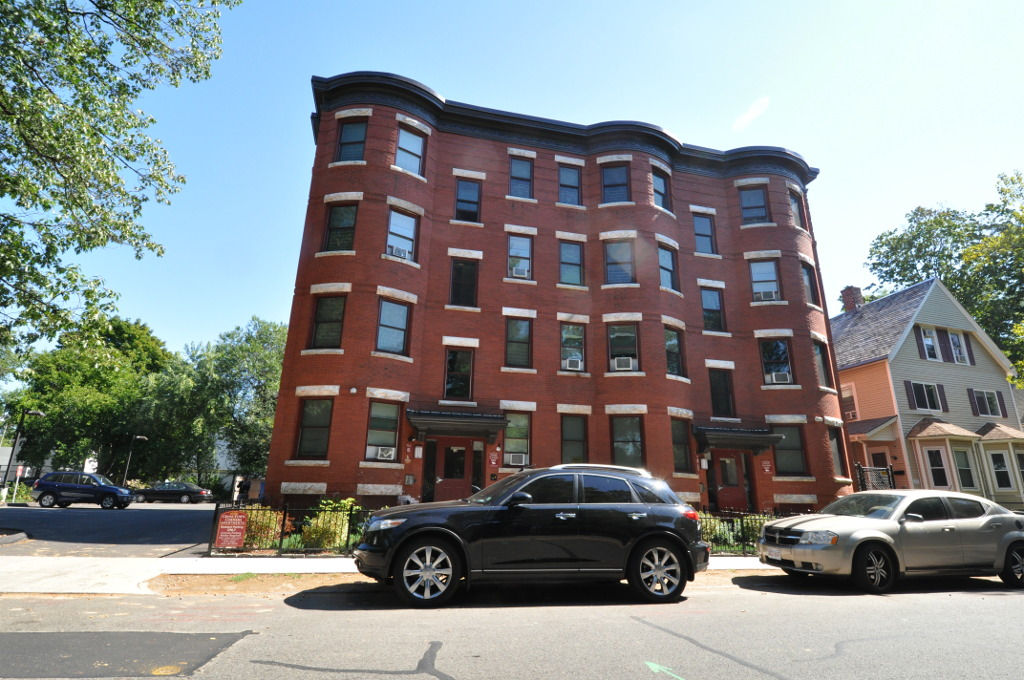

- Location within Massachusetts Location within the United States
- Location: 91-93 Pine St., Springfield, Massachusetts
- Coordinates: 42°6′8″N 72°34′22″W
- Area: less than one acre
- Built: 1910
- Architect: Angers, Pierre
- Architectural style: Classical Revival
- NRHP reference No.: 15000663
- Added to NRHP: September 29, 2015

The Ivernia Apartment Building is a historic residential apartment building at 91-93 Pine Street on the east side of Springfield, Massachusetts. Built in 1910, it is a well-preserved example of a Classical Revival apartment house, built during a boom period of apartment construction in the city. The building was listed on the National Register of Historic Places in 2015.

== Description and history ==
The Ivernia Apartment Building is located in Springfield's Six Corners neighborhood, on the east side of Pine Street opposite the Springfield Cemetery. It is the only brick apartment building on the street, flanked in both directions by single and multiple-family wood-frame houses. It is a four-story brick structure, built out of glazed red brick with marble trim. The building is larger than typical apartment houses of the period in which it was built (1910), housing twelve units unstead of the usual eight. It is correspondingly wider, with a three-part facade, each of which has a projecting rounded bay, and two entrances and stairwells.

The apartment house was built in 1910 by the firm of Gagnier and Angers, who built dozens of similar apartment houses throughout Springfield. It was built during a period when the interior parts of the city were being developed residentially as streetcar suburbs, with growth spurred by the running of streetcar lines into the area. Early residents of The Ivernia were typically either French-Canadian immigrants or English-speaking immigrants or new citizens.

== See also ==
- National Register of Historic Places listings in Springfield, Massachusetts
- National Register of Historic Places listings in Hampden County, Massachusetts
