= Hooker Apartments =

- U.S. National Register of Historic Places
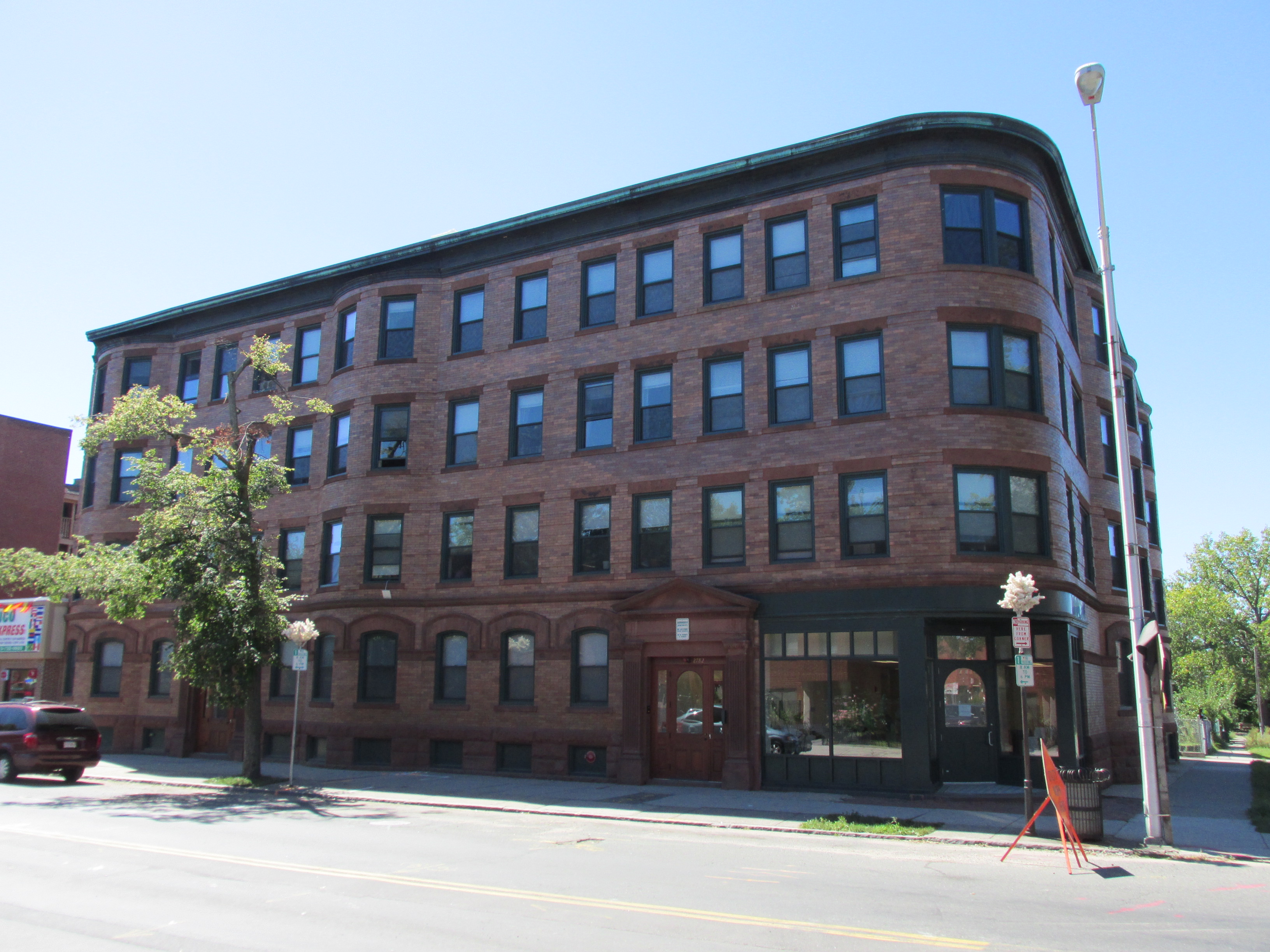

- Location within Massachusetts Location within the United States
- Location: 2772-2786 Main & 7 Greenwich Sts., Springfield, Massachusetts
- Coordinates: 42°6′58″N 72°36′25″W
- Area: less than one acre
- Built: 1908; 118 years ago
- Architect: Arsidas "Albert" Ostiguy
- NRHP reference No.: 13000596
- Added to NRHP: July 29, 2013

The Hooker Apartments are a large multiunit apartment building at the corner of Main and Greenwich Streets in the North End of Springfield, Massachusetts. Built in 1908, the building is one of a modest number of early 20th century apartment blocks to survive urban renewal efforts in the city's North End. It was listed on the National Register of Historic Places in 2013.

== Description and history ==
The Hooker Apartments are located at the southwest corner of Main and Greenwich Streets in the Memorial Square neighborhood north of Springfield's downtown. It is a four-story brick and brownstone building. Housing 23 residential units, it is one of the larger apartment blocks in the area. The building's street facades feature golden brick with brownstone trim, and two bowed sections on each side. The building is in a L shape, with a driveway and parking in the rear of the rectangular lot. There are three main entrances, two on Main Street and one on Greenwich. Each entrance is framed by brownstone pilasters with a triangular pediment above. At the corner on the ground floor is a small commercial space with its own entrance. Each floor has six living units, except the first, which has five (the storefront occupying the sixth space).

The apartment house was built in 1908 for developers William Dexter and Joseph Angers to a design by Arsidas "Albert" Ostiguy, and was named for Springfield civic leader Josiah Hooker (1796–1870). The North End was at that time an area of rapid growth, with a number of relatively large apartment developments taking place in the first two decades of the 20th century. By the late 1950s, much of the housing in the area was in decline, and many buildings were demolished as part of an urban renewal program in the 1960s and 1970s. The building was extensively rehabilitated in 2010, recovering years of neglect, vandalism, and some damage from a 2004 fire that affected a number of units on the building's south end.

== See also ==
- Calhoun Apartments
- Verona Apartments (Springfield, Massachusetts)
- National Register of Historic Places listings in Springfield, Massachusetts
- National Register of Historic Places listings in Hampden County, Massachusetts
