= Carlton House Block =

- U.S. National Register of Historic Places
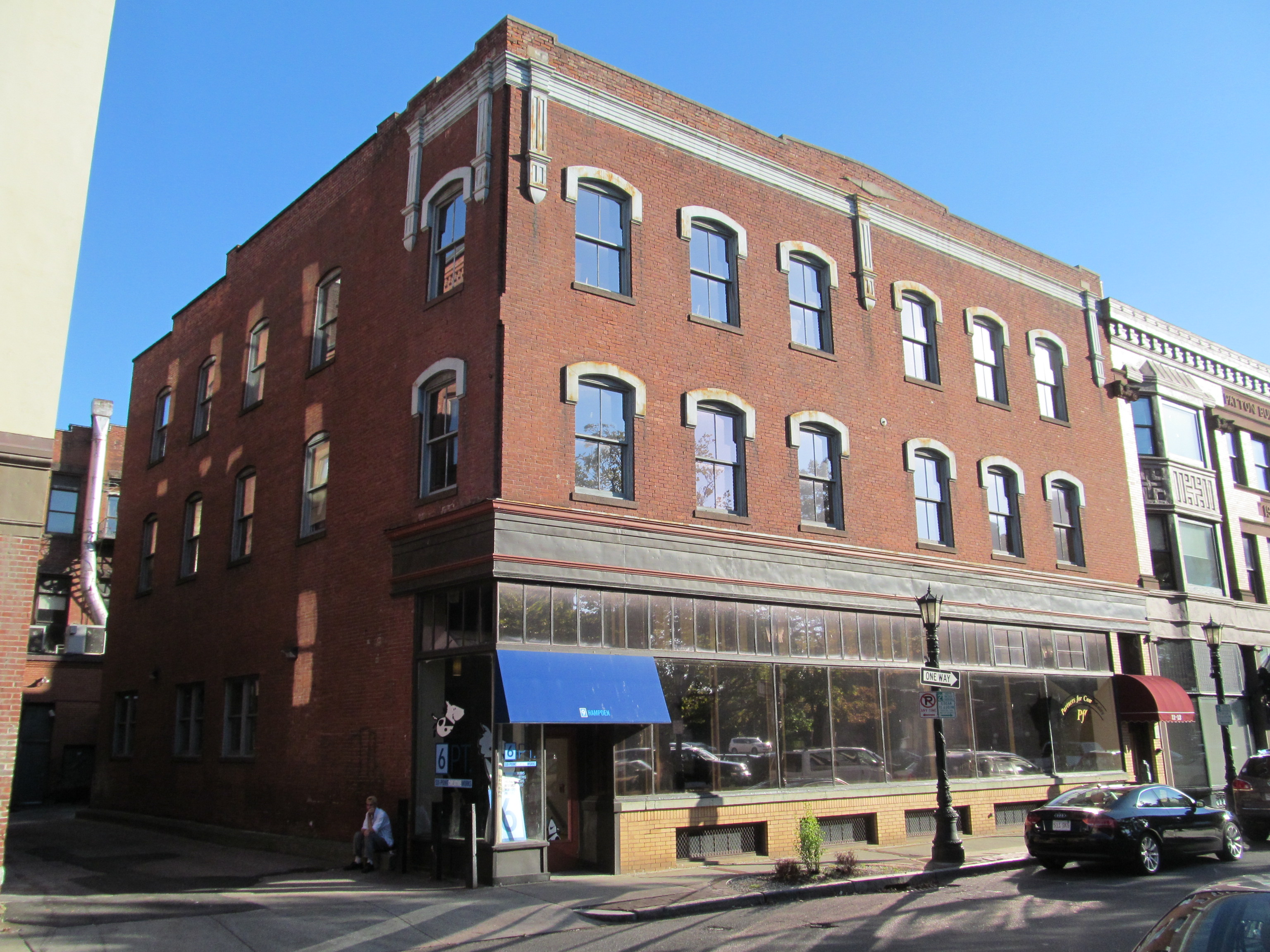
- Carlton House Block

- Location within Massachusetts Location within the United States
- Location: 9-13 Hampden St., Springfield, Massachusetts
- Coordinates: 42°6′13″N 72°35′40″W
- Area: less than one acre
- Built: 1874
- Architectural style: Italianate
- MPS: Downtown Springfield MRA
- NRHP reference No.: 83000741
- Added to NRHP: February 24, 1983

The Carlton House Block is a historic commercial and retail block at 9-13 Hampden Street in Springfield, Massachusetts. Built in 1873, and updated in the early 20th century, it is a good example of Italianate architecture, built during the downtown's development as an industrial and commercial center. The building was listed on the National Register of Historic Places in 1983.

== Description and history ==
The Carlton House Block is located on the northwestern side of Springfield's central business district, on the southeast side of Hampden Street midway between Main Street and East Columbus Avenue. It is a three-story brick building, with a flat roof and Italianate styling. Upper-level windows are set in segmented-arch openings topped by shouldered lintels, and the facade is topped by low parapet added in the early 20th century. A decorative band of stonework extends across the facade above the third-floor windows, and around to the left side for one bay, where the building's side is exposed to an alley. The ground floor has a single large storefront, with a broad expanse of plate glass windows in the center, the retail entrance to their left, and the upstairs entrance to their right.

The building was built in 1875 by William Patton, who acquired all of the buildings on the south side of Hampden Street in the 1870s and 1880s. Its name derives from its site, which was previously the location of the Carlton House Hotel. It was built for lease to one of the leading shoe and boot wholesale manufacturers in the area; they occupied the premises until 1897, after which it has seen a variety of tenants.

== See also ==
- National Register of Historic Places listings in Springfield, Massachusetts
- National Register of Historic Places listings in Hampden County, Massachusetts
