= Patton and Loomis Block =

- U.S. National Register of Historic Places
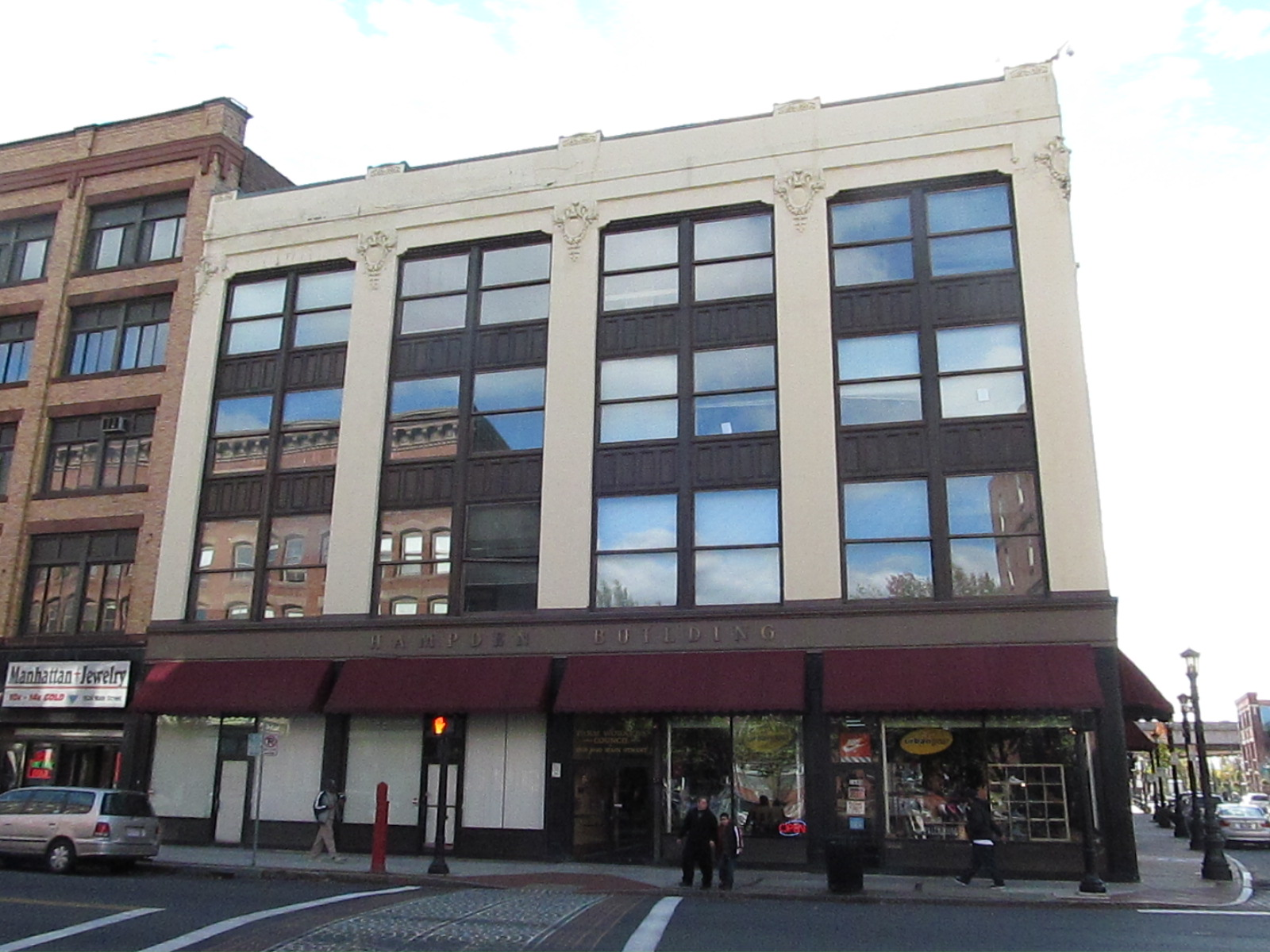
- Patton and Loomis Block

- Location within Massachusetts Location within the United States
- Location: 1628-40 Main St., Springfield, Massachusetts
- Coordinates: 42°6′14″N 72°35′40″W
- Area: less than one acre
- Built: 1864
- Architect: Currier, J.M.
- Architectural style: Early Commercial
- MPS: Downtown Springfield MRA
- NRHP reference No.: 83000759
- Added to NRHP: February 24, 1983

The Patton and Loomis Block is a historic commercial block at 1628-40 Main Street in downtown Springfield, Massachusetts, United States. Built in 1864 and remodeled in 1909, it is a good example of commercial architecture built or updated during two of the city's boom periods, in this case by two of the city's major developers. The block was listed on the National Register of Historic Places in 1983.

== Description and history ==
The Patton and Loomis Block is located in downtown Springfield, at the southwest corner of Main and Hampden Streets. It is a four-story masonry structure, finished in brick that is stuccoed on the Main Street facade, and part of the Hampden Street facade. The Main Street facade has three storefronts, two to the left of the main building entrance, and one larger one to its right. The upper floors are divided into three bays set apart by stuccoed brick pilasters rising to decorative medallions, each bay housing a pair of sash windows with a metal panel between the floors. It is crowned by a low parapet. The same treatment extends for one bay along Hampden Street, beyond which the buildings original brick facade continues.

The block was built in 1864 for C. L. Loomis and William Patton, a successful businessman who was one Springfield's wealthiest when he died in 1898. It was designed by J. M. Currier, a leading commercial architect of the period, and was built during a building boom occasioned by the city's economic success during the American Civil War. Patton used the building for his successful notions business, operating a retail shop on the ground floor and his offices on the second floor. The building's upper floors were used by a training school, and included a gymnasium and an auditorium.

The building was purchased by Frank L. Dunlap in 1909, at which time its facade was remodeled. Dunlap was also a major real estate developer, who built many commercial buildings during Springfield's second major boom, 1900–1920. Dunlap had the Main Street facade remodeled, giving it its present stucco appearance. The exterior has not been significantly altered since then, although storefronts were modified in the 1950s.

== See also ==
- Olmsted-Hixon-Albion Block, diagonally across Main Street
- National Register of Historic Places listings in Springfield, Massachusetts
- National Register of Historic Places listings in Hampden County, Massachusetts
