= Smith Carriage Company District =

Historic district in Massachusetts, United States

- U.S. National Register of Historic Places
- U.S. Historic district
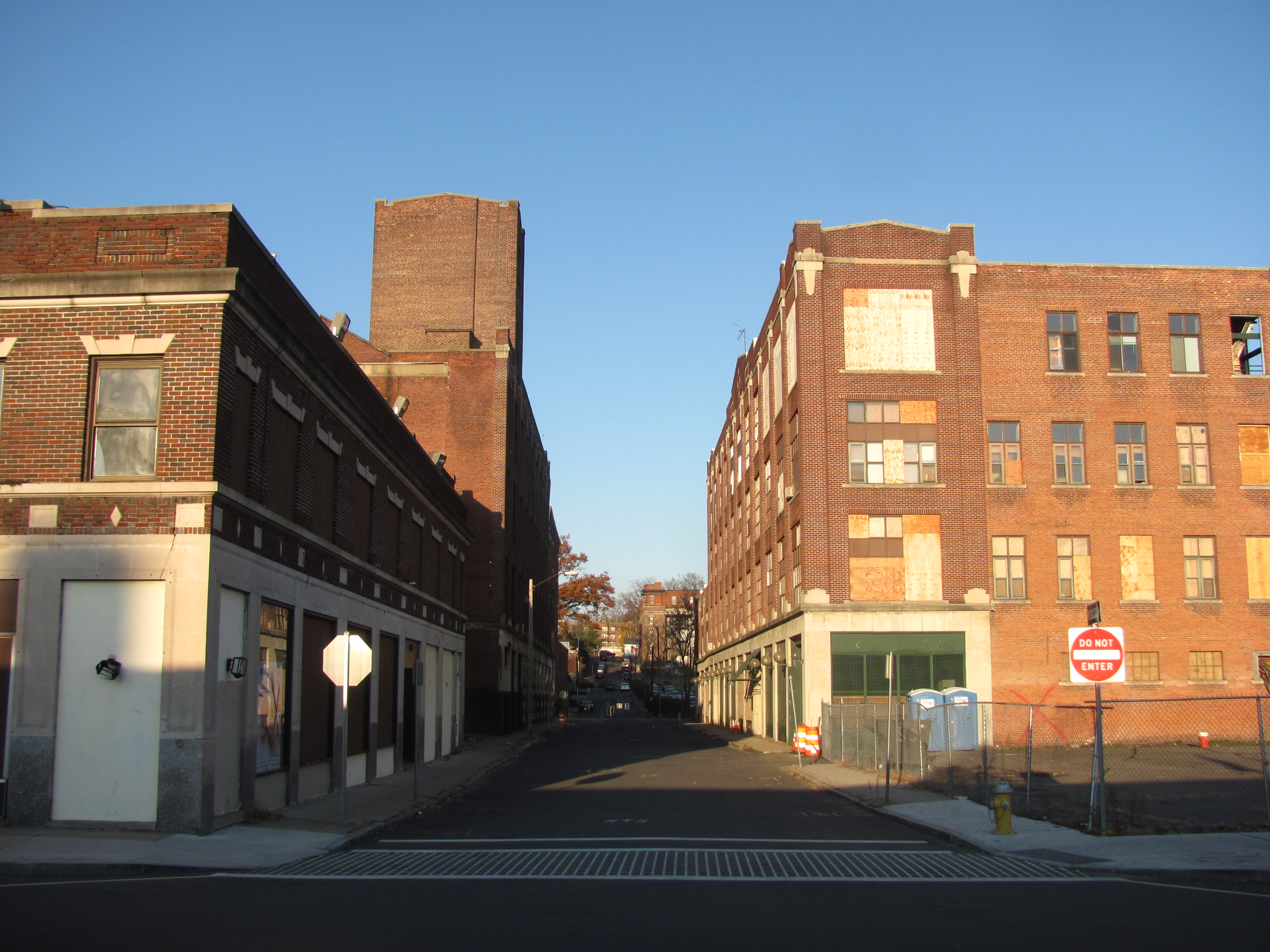
- Park Street

- Location within Massachusetts Location within the United States
- Location: Springfield, Massachusetts
- Coordinates: 42°6′0″N 72°35′5″W
- Built: 1880
- MPS: Downtown Springfield MRA
- NRHP reference No.: 83000763
- Added to NRHP: February 24, 1983

The Smith Carriage Company District encompasses three buildings on Park Street, Springfield, Massachusetts, between Main and Willow Streets. The buildings, located at 12, 14–38, and 11–31 Park Street, are noted for their historic association with the locally important Smith Carriage Company, a major manufacturer of carriages in the 19th century. The district was added to the National Register of Historic Places in 1983.

== Description and history ==
The Smith Carriage Company was founded in 1827 by David Smith, who had apprenticed at another carriage maker in Westfield. The company specialized in the manufacture of carriages with light frames, but also resold carriages made by others. In the early 20th century, it provided a chassis to the Stevens-Duryea Company that was used in one of its prototype automobiles. The company focus changed to the manufacture of automobile parts in the 1910s and 1920s, a business the company continued in until its final closure in the 1940s.

The three buildings on Park Street were built in later phases of the company's history. The oldest of the three, 12 Park, is a three-story brick building dating from the late 19th century; it has typical industrial architecture of that period, with segmented-arch window openings and a corbelled cornice and terra cotta detailing. The other two buildings have steel and concrete frames, finished in brick with concrete ground floors, and vary in height from two to four stories. Windows are large industrial sashes set in rectangular openings, with brick piers separating the bays on the upper floors. These were built to facilitate the company's production of automotive parts.

== See also ==
- National Register of Historic Places listings in Springfield, Massachusetts
- National Register of Historic Places listings in Hampden County, Massachusetts
