= Hancock Apartment Building =

- U.S. National Register of Historic Places
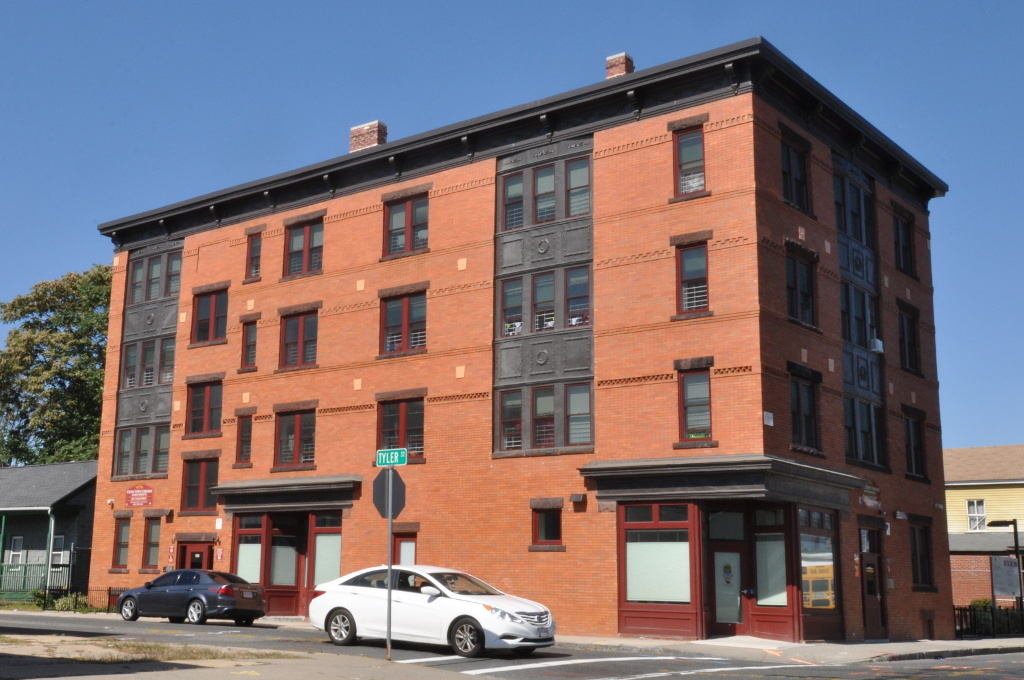

- Location within Massachusetts Location within the United States
- Location: 116-118 Hancock, 130 Tyler Sts., Springfield, Massachusetts
- Coordinates: 42°6′24″N 72°34′7″W
- Area: less than one acre
- Built: 1912
- Architect: Burton E. Geckler
- Architectural style: Classical Revival
- NRHP reference No.: 15000662
- Added to NRHP: September 29, 2015

The Hancock Apartment Building. also known as the Schaffer Apartments, is a historic mixed-used retail and residential apartment building at 116-118 Hancock Street and 130 Tyler Street on the east side of Springfield, Massachusetts. Built in 1912, it is good local example of an early 20th-century Classical Revival apartment house, built as the city's outer neighborhoods grew as streetcar suburbs. The building was listed on the National Register of Historic Places in 2015.

== Description and history ==
The Hancock Apartment Building is located in Springfield's Old Hill neighborhood, at the northwest corner of Tyler and Hancock Streets. It is a four-story brick structure, with an exterior of orange brick, a pressed metal cornice, and a flat roof. Decorative brick banding joins the tops of the windows, and runs just below the sills of the upper-level windows. Some of the upper-level windows are set in decorative metal panels in groups of three. The building underwent a certified historic rehabilitation in 2014, in which interior features such as trim and pressed metal ceilings were preserved.

The building was constructed in 1911-12 to a design by Burton E. Geckler, a local architect whose works include apartment blocks like this, single-family residences, commercial buildings, and churches both in Springfield and nearby Longmeadow. It was built for Tessie Schaffer & Company, a consortium of eastern European Jewish immigrants. It originally housed a dry goods store in the corner retail space. Many of the early residents were either native-born Americans or French-Canadian immigrants.

== See also ==
- National Register of Historic Places listings in Springfield, Massachusetts
- National Register of Historic Places listings in Hampden County, Massachusetts
