= Kenwyn Apartments =

- U.S. National Register of Historic Places
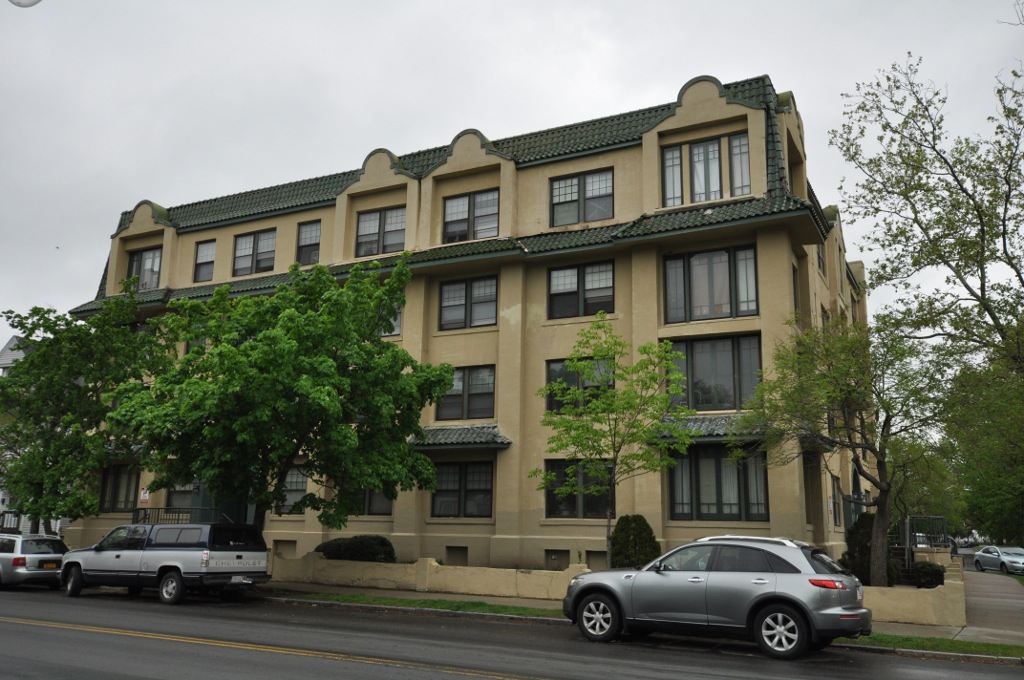

- Location within Massachusetts Location within the United States
- Location: 6 Kenwood Pk; 413-415 Belmont Ave., Springfield, Massachusetts
- Coordinates: 42°5′14″N 72°33′47″W
- Area: less than one acre
- Built: 1916
- Architect: Carpenter, William H., Co.
- Architectural style: Mission/Spanish Revival
- NRHP reference No.: 94001467
- Added to NRHP: November 14, 1994

The Kenwyn Apartments are a historic apartment house at 6 Kenwood Park & 413—415 Belmont Avenue in the Forest Park neighborhood of Springfield, Massachusetts. Built in 1916, they are a rare local example of Mission style architecture. It was listed on the National Register of Historic Places in 1994.

== Description and history ==
The Kenwyn Apartments are located on the eastern edge of Springfield's Forest Park Heights neighborhood, at the northwest corner of Kenwood Park and Belmont Avenue. It is a four-story masonry structure, with Mission style construction and detailing. Built of stone, it has a stuccoed exterior, and other Mission elements such as round arch entries, barrel-style overhangs, and Spanish-style parapets.

The block was built in 1916 by William H. Carpenter, during a brief period in which the Spanish Colonial Revival style was popular; it faded after some of its principal features (stucco walls and clay tiles) proved unsuitable for the climate. The city was at that time undergoing a residential building boom, in which large numbers of apartment houses were built along recently introduced streetcare lines. The building went through a rapid succession of owners, until it was acquired by the Pasquale Corporation in 1940. The building remained in its ownership for thirty years. Thereafter, with declining economic conditions in the neighborhood, the building again went through a number of owners. After a foreclosure proceeding in 1990 there were calls to tear the building down, but preservationists were able to propose a rehabilitation of the structure.

== See also ==
- National Register of Historic Places listings in Springfield, Massachusetts
- National Register of Historic Places listings in Hampden County, Massachusetts
