= Myrtle Street School =

- U.S. National Register of Historic Places
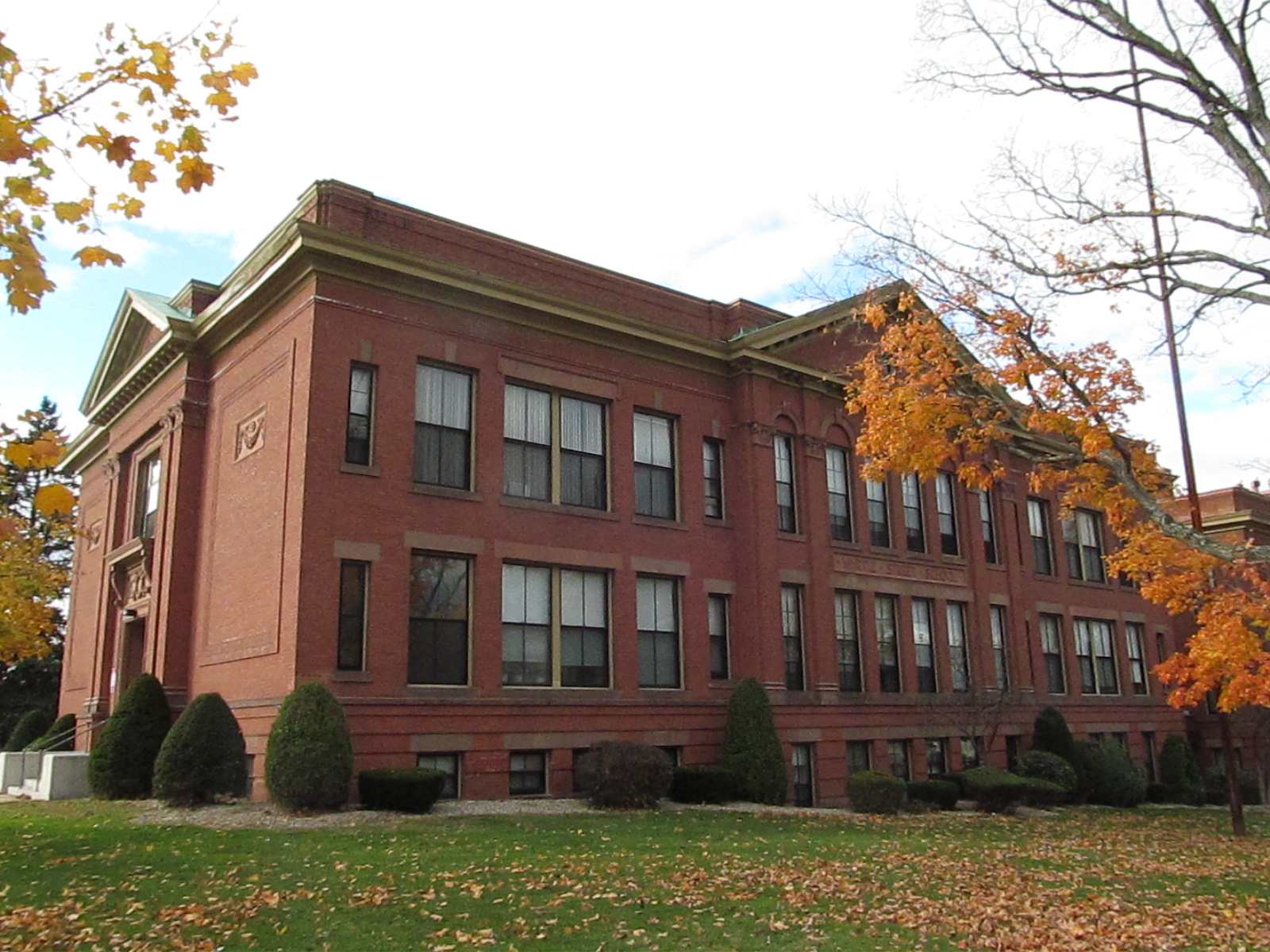
- Myrtle Street School

- Location within Massachusetts Location within the United States
- Location: Springfield, Massachusetts
- Coordinates: 42°09′30″N 72°30′23″W
- Area: 2.3 acres (0.93 ha)
- Built: 1868
- Architect: James M. Currier (1868), E. C. & G. C. Gardner (1903 and 1914)
- Architectural style: Classical Revival, Second Empire, Exotic Revival
- NRHP reference No.: 85000024
- Added to NRHP: January 3, 1985

The Myrtle Street School is a historic school at 64 Myrtle Street in the Indian Orchard neighborhood of Springfield, Massachusetts. Built in stages between 1868 and 1915, it encapsulates changing trends in school design over that period of time, and is a good example of a school building with Second Empire and Classical Revival features. It was listed on the National Register of Historic Places in 1985. It has been converted to residential use.

== Description and history ==
The Myrtle Street School is located in the Indian Hill neighborhood of northeastern Springfield, on a lot bounded by Worcester, Myrtle and Hampden Streets on three sides, and residential properties on the west side. It is very roughly U-shaped, with broad wings facing Myrtle Street joined by connecting sections at the back; further elements project from the rear spine of the building. The Myrtle Street facades are similar, with Classical Revival styling including pilasters and projecting central portions topped by pedimented gables.

The school was built in three stages between 1868 and 1915. The oldest portion of the school exhibits Second Empire styling, while major additions in 1903 and 1914 added additional classroom space, an auditorium and gymnasium, and hallways connecting the various portions to each other. The later additions were built with Classical Revival styling, and largely obscure the 1868 building, which is now at the rear of the complex. Many of the original features of the buildings have survived, including elements such as wooden staircases and decorative molding in the 1868 portion.

== See also ==
- National Register of Historic Places listings in Springfield, Massachusetts
- National Register of Historic Places listings in Hampden County, Massachusetts
