= Evans Court Apartment Building =

- U.S. National Register of Historic Places
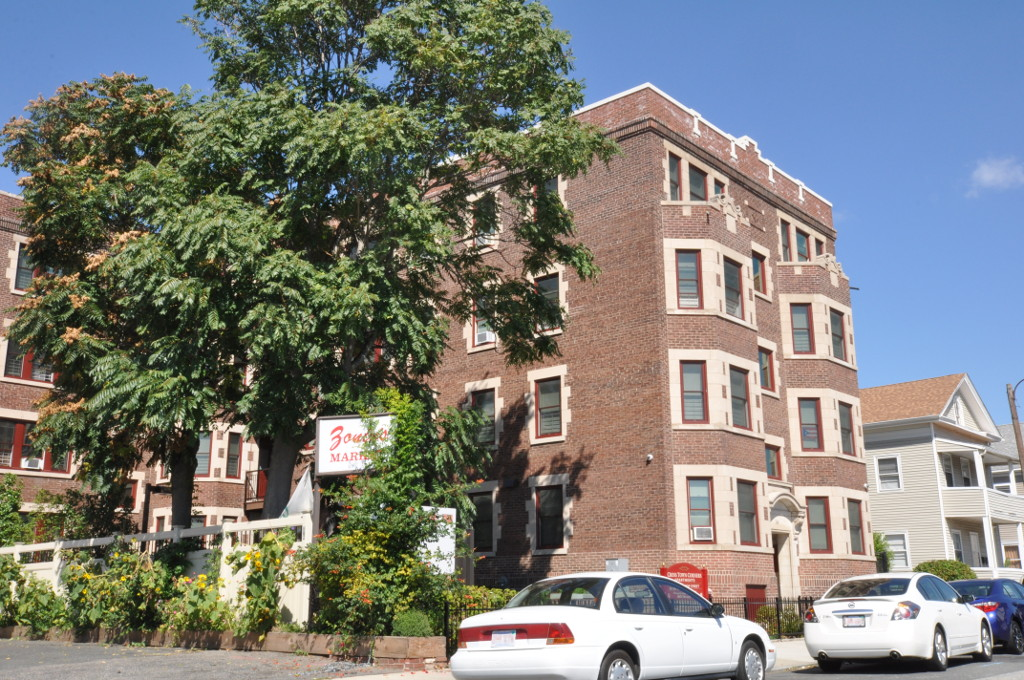

- Location within Massachusetts Location within the United States
- Location: 22-24 Winthrop St., Springfield, Massachusetts
- Coordinates: 42°5′54″N 72°34′56″W
- Area: less than one acre
- Built: 1910
- Architect: Angers, Joseph & Edelmard
- Architectural style: Classical Revival
- NRHP reference No.: 15000661
- Added to NRHP: September 29, 2015

The Evans Court Apartment Building is a historic apartment building at 22-24 Winthrop Street in the South End of Springfield, Massachusetts. Built in 1910, it is an example of a Classical Revival apartment house, and one of the first to be built in the city after it introduced a new fire code. Rehabilitated in 2014, the building was listed on the National Register of Historic Places in 2015.

== Description and history ==
The Evans Court Apartment Building is located in Springfield's South End, on the west side of Winthrop Street north of Main Street. It is a four-story brick structure, shaped like an L, with a section projecting to the left at its rear. The front facade has three-story projecting polygonal bays flanking the center entrance, which are topped by decorative cartouches. The main entrance is framed by concrete quoining at the sides, with scrolled brackets supporting an arched pediment. A similarly-decorated entrance provides access to the residential units of the rear portion of the building. The building has sixteen units, whose interiors have been updated in historically sensitive ways in 2014.

The building and was built in 1910, a period when nearby Main Street was heavily developed with such apartment blocks. The developer who headed the development was Frank Dunlap, a major real estate developer in the city, and it was built and designed by the firm of J. E. Angers and Brother, a construction firm run by French-Canadian immigrants. Dunlap and the Angers collaborated on a number of projects in the city. Early residents of the building were predominantly American-born, but by 1930 the demographics had changed to predominantly immigrant families. The building was damaged in 2011 Springfield tornado, suffering interior water penetration and damage to its parapet; these were fixed during the 2014 rehabilitation.

== See also ==
- National Register of Historic Places listings in Springfield, Massachusetts
- National Register of Historic Places listings in Hampden County, Massachusetts
