= Adams Apartment Building =

- U.S. National Register of Historic Places
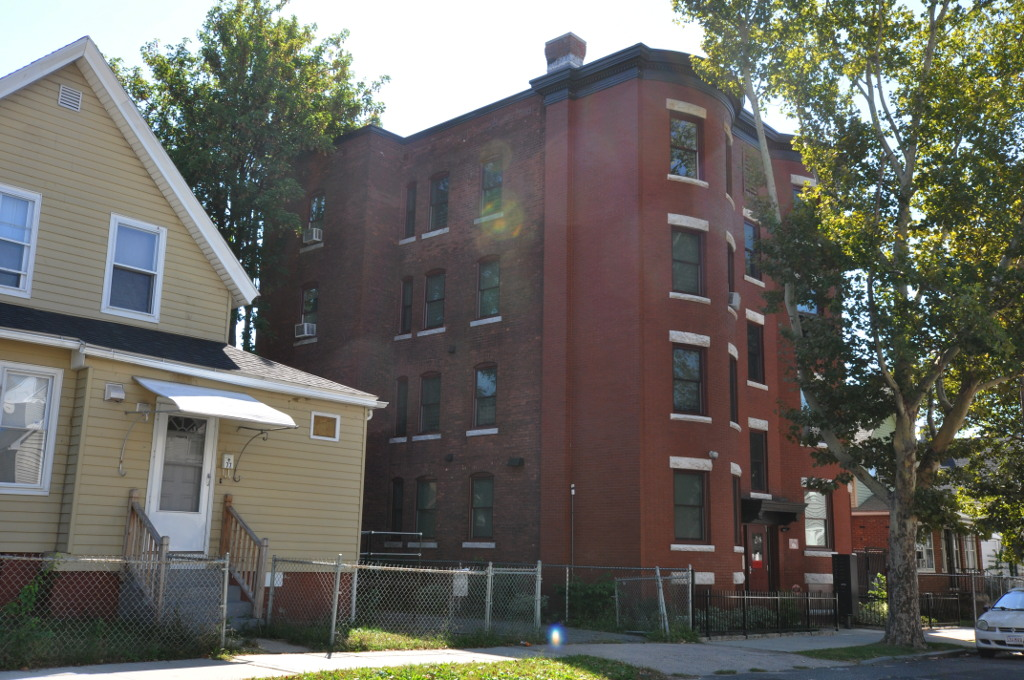

- Location within Massachusetts Location within the United States
- Location: 71 Adams Street, Springfield, Massachusetts
- Coordinates: 42°5′50″N 72°34′48″W
- Area: less than one acre
- Built: 1912
- Built by: Gagnier & Angers
- Architect: Pierre Angers
- Architectural style: Classical Revival
- NRHP reference No.: 15000660
- Added to NRHP: September 29, 2015

The Adams Apartment Building is a historic eight-unit apartment building at 71 Adams Street in the South End of Springfield, Massachusetts. Built in 1912, it is a well-preserved local example of Classical Revival architecture. The building, which suffered significant damage in the 2011 Springfield tornado and has been restored, was listed on the National Register of Historic Places in 2015.

== Description and history ==
The Adams Apartment Building is located in a residential setting in Springfield's South End, on the south side of Adams Street between Richelieu Road and Dwight Street Extension. It is a four-story masonry structure, its exterior finished in brick and covered by a flat roof. It has Classical Revival styling, with full-height rounded bays flanking a center bay with the entrance at its base, sheltered by a portico with scrolled brackets. The front is finished in glazed red brick, while the sides are in common brick. A stack of modern wood-frame porches are built on the rear of the building. The interior has two units on each floor, with a central living area, and front and rear bedrooms. Although most doors and windows have been replaced, original trim remains in many places. The main lobby features an original marble floor, and the central staircase retains its railing, although the stairs have been rebuilt to meet modern codes.

The building was built in 1912 by contractors and developers Gagnier & Angers and designed by Pierre Angers, the firm's junior partner. The building was built for Anatole Payette at a cost $13,500. It was built as part of a trend in the city that saw the construction of brick apartment blocks throughout the city, many by or for the French Canadian immigrant community. Angers, one of those immigrants, is credited with a number of large-scale residential projects in the city. This building suffered significant damage in the 2011 Springfield tornado, including the loss of its roof and extensive water damage. It underwent a certified historic rehabilitation afterward.

== See also ==
- National Register of Historic Places listings in Springfield, Massachusetts
- National Register of Historic Places listings in Hampden County, Massachusetts
