= Whitcomb Warehouse =

- U.S. National Register of Historic Places
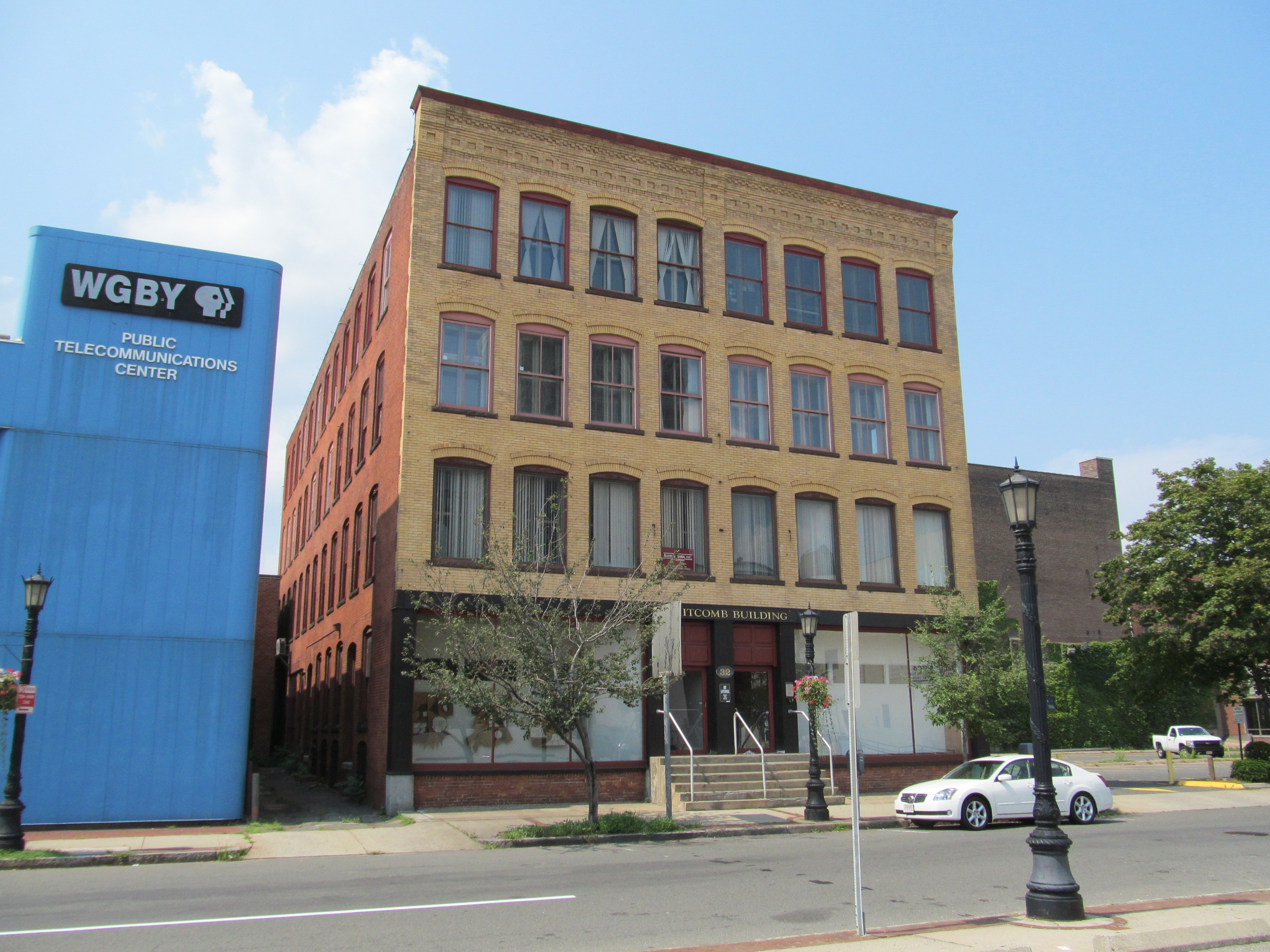
- Whitcomb Building

- Location within Massachusetts Location within the United States
- Location: 23-24 Hampden St., Springfield, Massachusetts
- Coordinates: 42°6′13″N 72°35′44″W
- Area: less than one acre
- Built: 1896
- MPS: Downtown Springfield MRA
- NRHP reference No.: 83004291
- Added to NRHP: February 24, 1983

The Whitcomb Warehouse is a historic warehouse at 32-34 Hampden Street in Springfield, Massachusetts. Built in 1896, it is one of the most intact late 19th century industrial buildings in Springfield. It was listed on the National Register of Historic Places in 1983.

== Description and history ==
The Whitcomb Warehouse is located on the northwest side of downtown Springfield, on the north side of Hampden Street east of East Columbus Avenue. The area is now generally devoid of other 19th-century or early 20th-century buildings, the result of urban decay and renewal activities. It is a four-story masonry structure, finished in yellow brick. The ground floor facade consists of two garage-style doors, flanking a pair of pedestrian entrances sharing an access stair. The garage doors have been covered over by large display windows, set on a low brick wall in the door openings. The upper floors are eight bays wide, with sash windows set in segmented-arch openings, headed by rows of soldier bricks, one projecting slightly. The building is crowned by a frieze band of decorative brick work and a modest patterned brick cornice.

The warehouse was built in 1896, and was first associated with the Springfield Cigar Manufacturing Company, the city's largest manufacturer of cigars. It was later sold to Colby Manufacturing, a maker of rulers. Other 20th-century uses of the building have included as an arts center.

== See also ==
- National Register of Historic Places listings in Springfield, Massachusetts
- National Register of Historic Places listings in Hampden County, Massachusetts
