= Downtown Springfield Railroad District =

Historic district in Massachusetts, United States

- U.S. National Register of Historic Places
- U.S. Historic district
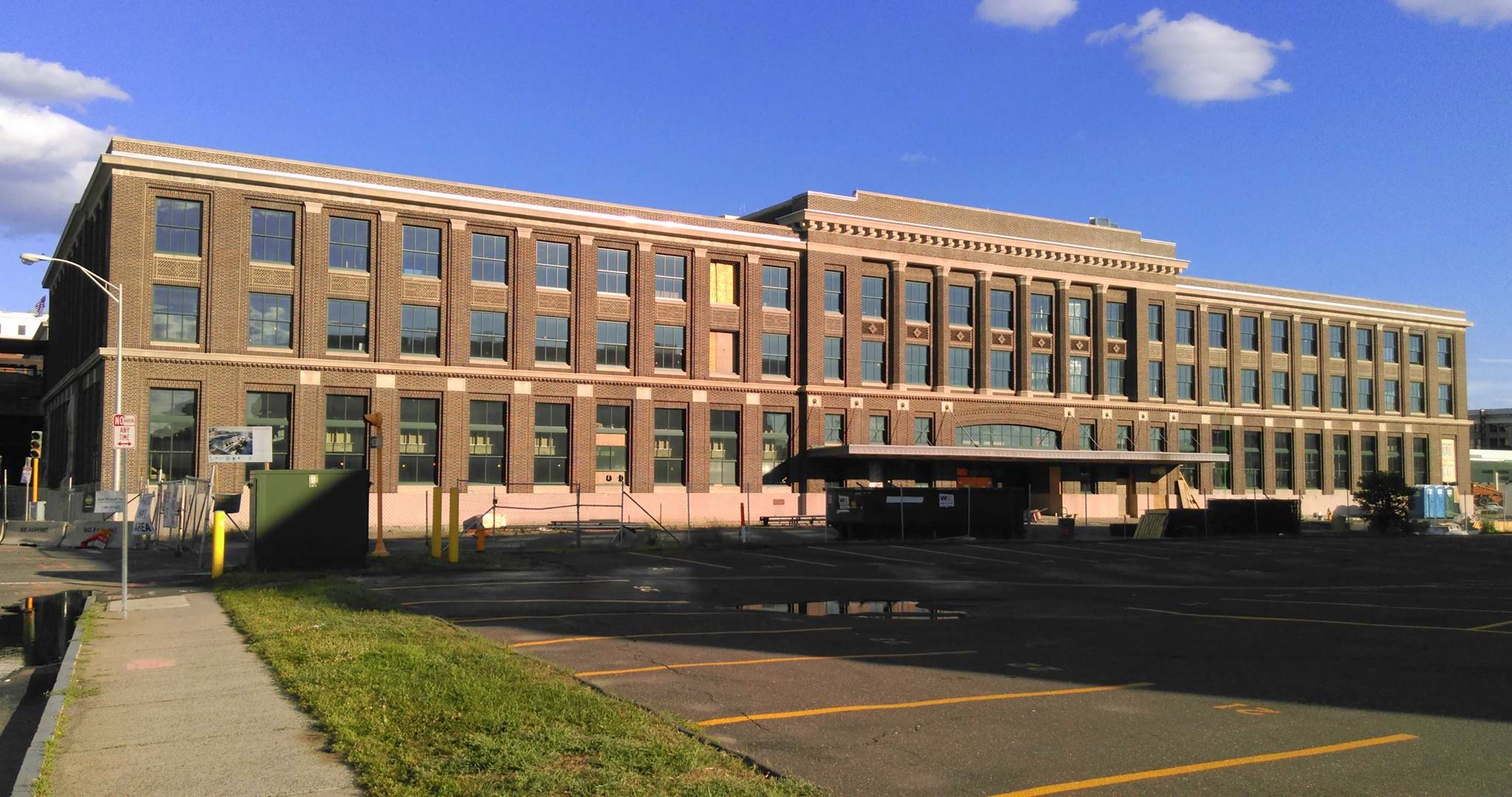
- Union Station

- Location within Massachusetts Location within the United States
- Location: Springfield, Massachusetts
- Coordinates: 42°6′31″N 72°35′25″W
- Built: 1875
- MPS: Downtown Springfield MRA
- NRHP reference No.: 83000745
- Added to NRHP: May 27, 1983

The Downtown Springfield Railroad District is a historic district encompassing a group of early 20th century railroad-related buildings in Springfield, Massachusetts, USA. They are in an area roughly bounded by Lyman, Main, Dwight and Frank B. Murray Streets. The district includes the Union Station, the old freight house, commercial warehouses and a retaining wall and bridge designed in part by H. H. Richardson. The district was added to the National Register of Historic Places in 1983.

== Description and history ==
Springfield was from an early date a significant transportation crossroads, with traffic on the north-south Connecticut River and the east-west Boston Post Road as major transportation routes. With the arrival of railroads in the 1830s, the city became a major transit point for freight moved on railroads along similar routes. Its early train stations were located at the northern end of downtown, on the west side of Main Street near the main rail junction. A major former freight house, built in 1875, is located north of the tracks and east of Main Street. In 1889, the grade-level crossing of Main Street was replaced by a stone arch bridge. It and the stone embankment wall on the north side of Lyman Street were designed by H. H. Richardson. This change was accompanied by the construction of new stations on the east side of Main Street, which were consolidated into the single large Union Station in 1924. That building, vacant for many years, underwent rehabilitation in 2016-17 and again is a transportation hub.

Adjacent to Union Station stood the Hotel Charles, at 11 stories a major landmark. It was demolished in 1997 after a fire gutted its interior. Across the tracks from Union Station, the south side of Lyman Street was lined by a series of freight warehouses, all of brick construction, and varying in height and style. A number of these still survive, but some have been demolished since the National Register listing.

== See also ==
- National Register of Historic Places listings in Springfield, Massachusetts
- National Register of Historic Places listings in Hampden County, Massachusetts
