= St. James Apartments =

- U.S. National Register of Historic Places
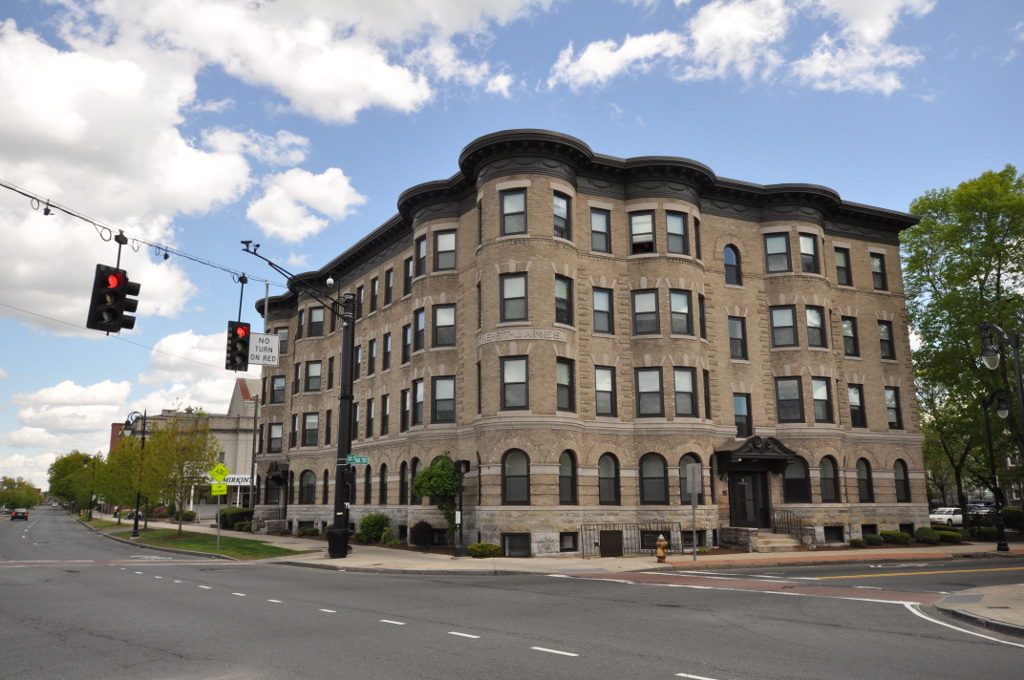

- Location within Massachusetts Location within the United States
- Location: 573 State St.: Five Oak St., Springfield, Massachusetts
- Coordinates: 42°6′33″N 72°34′27″W
- Area: less than one acre
- Built: 1902
- Architect: William B. Reid
- Architectural style: Classical Revival
- NRHP reference No.: 100003941
- Added to NRHP: January 21, 2020

The St. James Apartments are a historic apartment house at 573 State Street & 5 Oak Street in Springfield, Massachusetts. Built in 1904, it is a good local example of Classical Revival architecture. It was listed on the National Register of Historic Places in 2020.

== Description and history ==
The St. James Apartments are located just southeast of the extended former Springfield Armory grounds, at the southeast corner of State Street and Oak Street. It is a four-story masonry structure, organized in a U shape with its main facade facing State Street and wings extending south. Both street-facing facades feature projecting rounded bays, with one at the street corner. Ground-floor windows are set in round-arch openings, while the second and third-floor windows have keystones of cast stone. Bands of cast stone and multicolored and projecting brick courses add interest to the facades, and a cornice separates the first and second floors. The interior houses eighteen units of varying size, retaining only a modest number of period features.

The block was built in 1904 by Joseph Laliberte to a design by William B. Reid. Both Reid and Laliberte were Canadian immigrants resident in Holyoke, and the building appears to have been a speculative venture. Its construction is representative of the growth of the area's immigrant Canadian population in the city in the early 20th century. Its early residents were a mix of tradespeople and skilled craftsmen, including immigrants from Canada and Ireland. The building's interior underwent a major renovation in 1983.

== See also ==
- National Register of Historic Places listings in Springfield, Massachusetts
- National Register of Historic Places listings in Hampden County, Massachusetts
