= New Bay Diner Restaurant =

- U.S. National Register of Historic Places
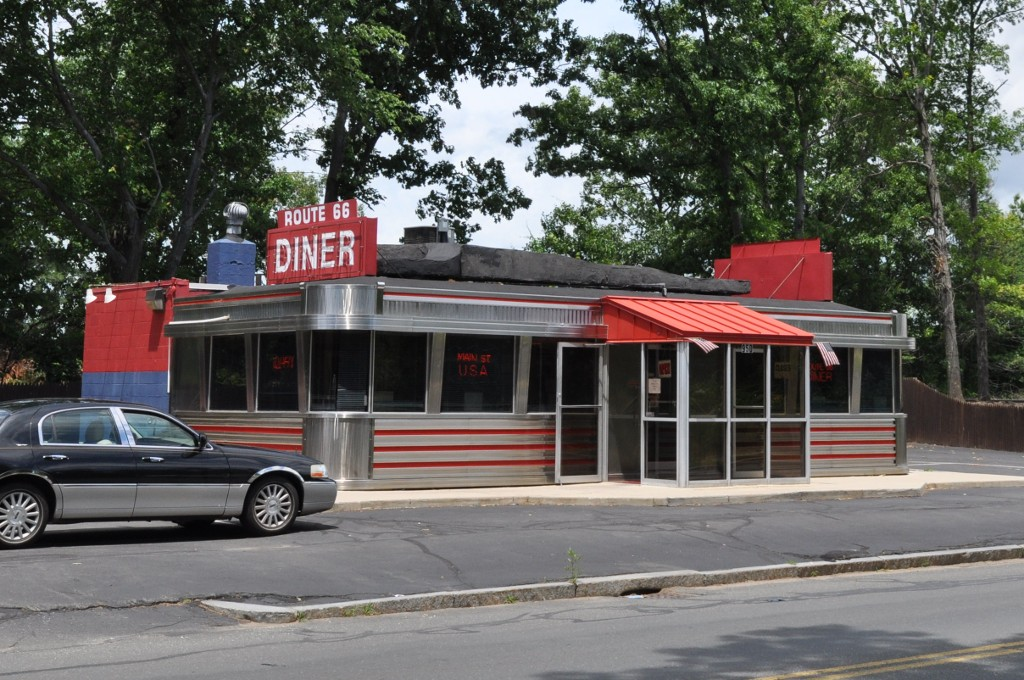

- Location within Massachusetts Location within the United States
- Location: 950 Bay St., Springfield, Massachusetts
- Coordinates: 42°7′51″N 72°33′17″W
- Architect: Mountain View Diners
- MPS: Diners of Massachusetts MPS
- NRHP reference No.: 03001244
- Added to NRHP: December 4, 2003

The New Bay Diner Restaurant is a historic diner in Springfield, Massachusetts. It was manufactured by the Mountain View Diners Company in Singac, New Jersey (as #532) in 1957; it is believed to be the second-to-last diner the company built before it shut down later that year. The diner is attached to a concrete block structure which houses the kitchen and restrooms, and appears to also date to 1957. At the time of its listing on the National Register of Historic Places in 2003, it was one of six surviving Mountain View diners in Massachusetts, and the only diner remaining in Springfield.

When the diner was listed in Springfield's 1964 business directory, it was called the New Bay Diner Restaurant, and its owner was listed as Anthony Viamare of Granby, Massachusetts. Viamare owned it until 1988, when it was acquired by Donald Roy. He changed its name to the "Route 66 Diner", which is its present name.

The diner is of steel frame construction, seven window bays wide, with rounded corners. It is mounted on a concrete and brick foundation, has red horizontal banding, and a rounded rubber membrane roof. The doors are steel and glass, although elements of the vestibule do not appear to be original. Its windows are plate glass, separated by steel pilasters. There are signs on the roof, facing east and west, with the diner's name, "Route 66 Diner"; the "Diner" is highlighted in neon. Inside, the diner has a full length counter, with staff access points at the center and the left side. Access to the kitchen is by a door in the center. The diner has seventeen stools and six booths. Its interior decoration is largely original; the countertop has been replaced.

== See also ==
- National Register of Historic Places listings in Springfield, Massachusetts
- National Register of Historic Places listings in Hampden County, Massachusetts
