= Wigglesworth Building (Springfield, Massachusetts) =

- U.S. National Register of Historic Places
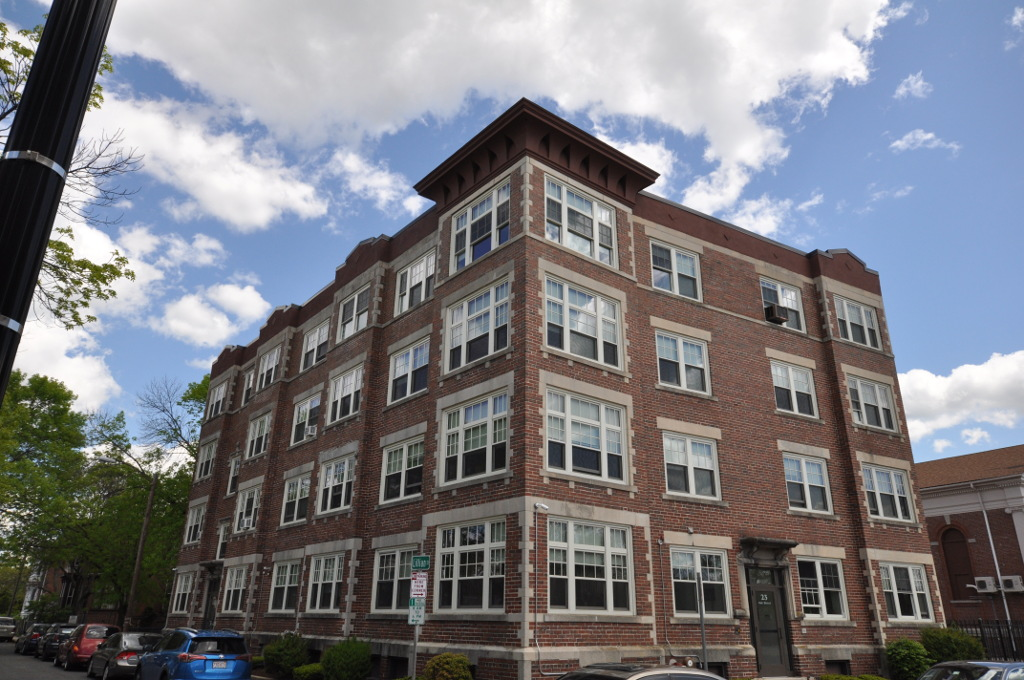

- Location within Massachusetts Location within the United States
- Location: 23 Oak St.; 71 Lillian St., Springfield, Massachusetts
- Coordinates: 42°6′31″N 72°34′26″W
- Area: less than one acre
- Built: 1917
- Architect: Howes, Lyman
- Architectural style: Colonial Revival
- NRHP reference No.: 100003943
- Added to NRHP: January 21, 2020

The Wigglesworth Building is a historic apartment house at 77 Lillian Street and 23 Oak Street in Springfield, Massachusetts. Built in 1917, it is a good local example of Colonial Revival architecture, typifying the city's multiunit construction after the introduction of new building codes. It was listed on the National Register of Historic Places in 2020.

== Description and history ==
The Wigglesworth Building is located southeast of the extended former Springfield Armory grounds, at the southeast corner of Oak Street and Lillian Street. It is a four-story masonry structure, organized in a U shape with its main facade facing Oak Street and wings extending east. The Oak Street facade houses then main entrance at the center of a five-bay facade. The outer corner bays project slightly, articulated by stone corner quoining. Windows in those bays are grouped in threes, with transom windows above, with shouldered stone lintels. Windows in the center bays are paired sash, with unshouldered stone lintels. The Lillian Street facade is seven bays long, alternating projecting and recessed sections with similar window arrangements. The interior houses sixteen apartments, which have seen significant alteration and retain few period features.

The block was built in 1917 by Joseph Laliberte to a design by Lyman Howes, a local architect. The developer was Austin Wigglesworth, owner of a local construction company, who tore down an older multiunit building on the site. The city had changed its building codes in 1910 to require more fireproof construction materials in larger multiunit residential buildings like this one, resulting in a decline in wood-frame tenement-style housing. Early residents were skilled tradespeople, managers, and shopkeepers. The building's interior underwent a major renovation in 1983.

== See also ==
- National Register of Historic Places listings in Springfield, Massachusetts
- National Register of Historic Places listings in Hampden County, Massachusetts
