= Wells Block =

- U.S. National Register of Historic Places
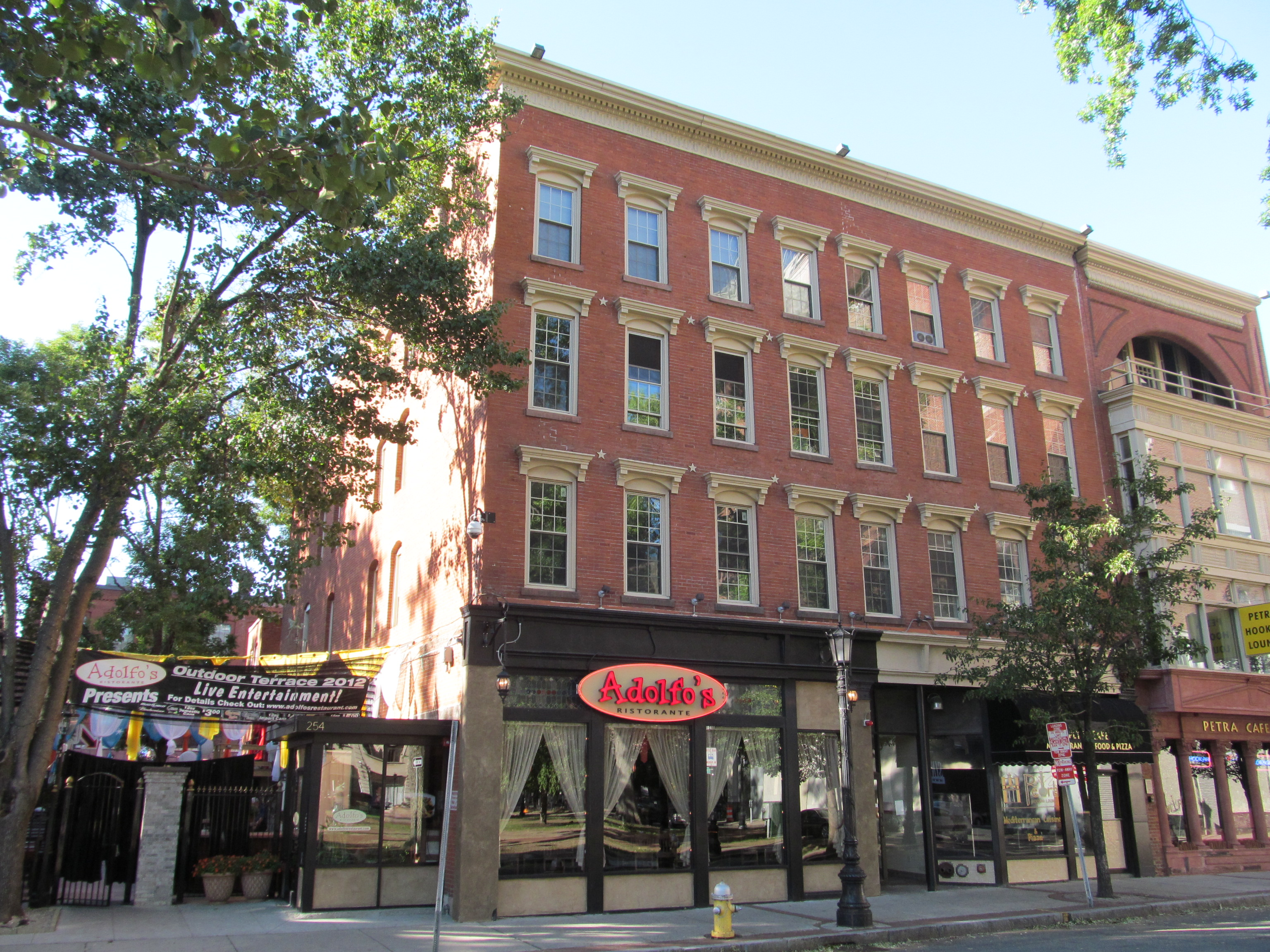
- Wells Block

- Location within Massachusetts Location within the United States
- Location: Springfield, Massachusetts
- Coordinates: 42°06′18″N 72°35′30″W
- Area: less than one acre
- Built: 1876
- Architectural style: Italianate
- MPS: Downtown Springfield MRA
- NRHP reference No.: 83000777
- Added to NRHP: February 24, 1983

The Wells Block is a historic mixed use commercial and residential block at 250-264 Worthington Street in downtown Springfield, Massachusetts. Built in 1876, it is a rare period example of a mixed-use retail and residential building. It was listed on the National Register of Historic Places in 1983.

== Description and history ==
The Wells Block is located in downtown Springfield, on the north side of Worthington Street opposite Stearns Square, a small public park. It is a four-story masonry structure, built out of red brick. The ground floor has two storefronts on either side of a recessed central entrance, with stone piers separating the elements and a pressed metal cornice above. Windows on the upper floors are set in segmented-arch openings, topped by bracketed cornices. The main roof cornice is modest, with dentil molding.

The block was built in 1876 for Abner Abbey on the former site of his lumber yard, and was sold to Jerome Wells the following year. The first floor housed a pair of retail storefronts, while the upper floors were operated as a tenement house, boarding house, and hotel until they were extensively damaged by fire in 1946. A two-story addition was made to the rear in the 1890s. The building was home for a number of years to the Grand Union Tea Company, a prominent local retailer of specialty imported teas. The upper floors were vacant when the building was listed on the National Register of Historic Places in 1983. It is the only surviving building of this type from the period in the city.

== See also ==
- National Register of Historic Places listings in Springfield, Massachusetts
- National Register of Historic Places listings in Hampden County, Massachusetts
