= Olmsted-Hixon-Albion Block =

- U.S. National Register of Historic Places
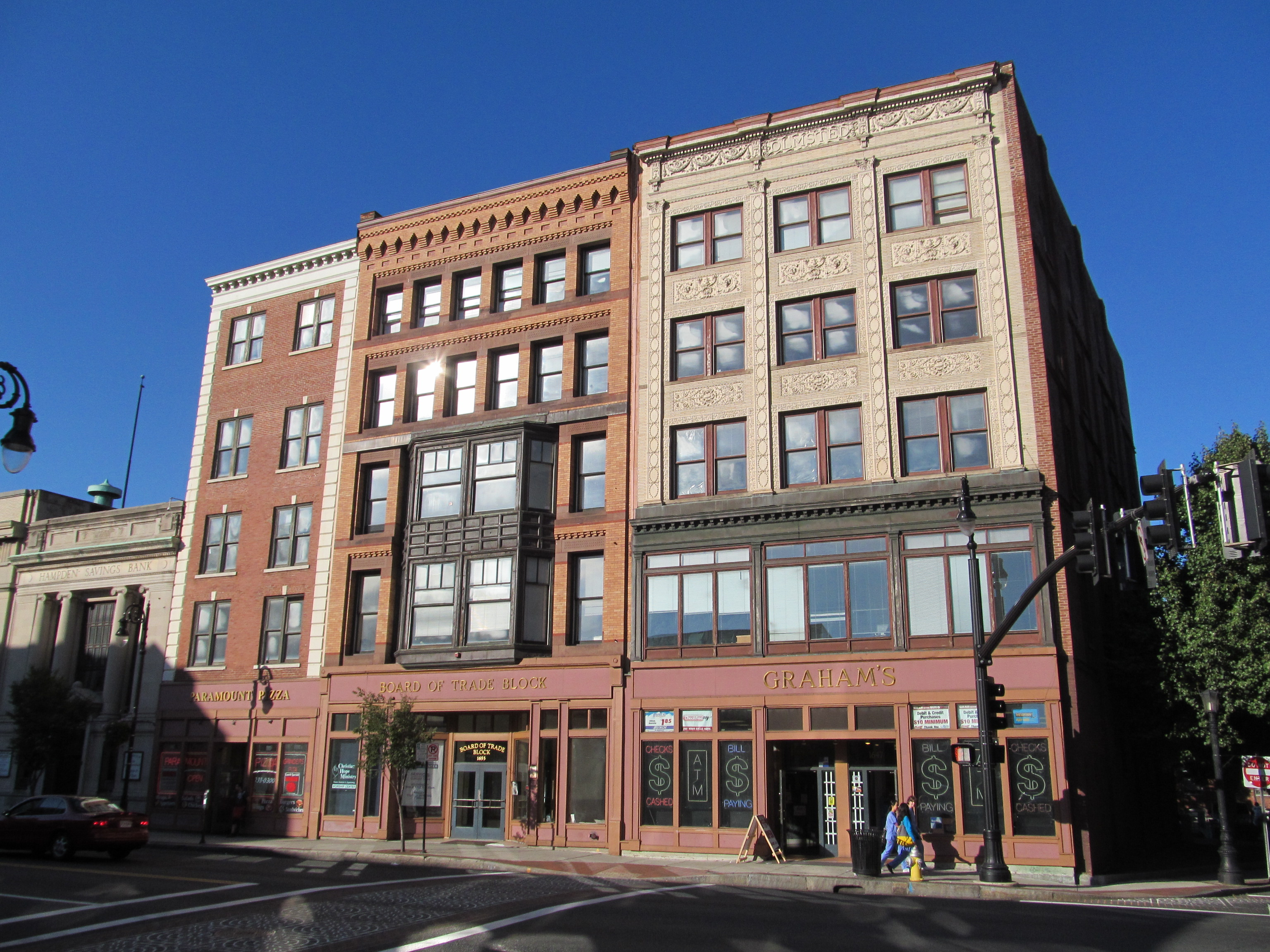
- Olmsted-Hixon-Albion Block

- Location within Massachusetts Location within the United States
- Location: Springfield, Massachusetts
- Coordinates: 42°6′15″N 72°35′40″W
- Area: less than one acre
- Built: 1862, 1866, 1875, 1892, 1927
- Architect: Dibble, Wallace; Perkins, Jason
- Architectural style: Classical Revival
- MPS: Downtown Springfield MRA
- NRHP reference No.: 83000758
- Added to NRHP: February 24, 1983

The Olmsted-Hixon-Albion Block is a historic commercial block at 1645-1659 Main Street in the north end of downtown Springfield, Massachusetts. The building is actually three separate 19th-century buildings that were conjoined by internal connections in 1929, making a good example of adaptive reuse of commercial architecture in the city. The building was listed on the National Register of Historic Places in 1983.

== Description and history ==
The Olmsted-Hixon-Albion Block is located in downtown Springfield, at the northwest corner of Taylor and Main Streets. Overall, the building is five stories in height, and retains the facades of its original constituent buildings. The leftmost Albion Block is finished mainly in red brick, with a single retail storefront on the ground floor, and is two bays wide on the upper floors, each bay holding pairs of sash windows. The edges of the facade have stone quoining, and the building is capped by a frieze and cornice. The central Hixon Block houses the main building entrance on the ground floor, and has a two-bay copper-clad window bay on the second and third floors, flanked by sash windows. The top two floors have six bays of sash windows; the floors are set apart by bands of brick corbelling. The rightmost Olmsted Block houses two storefronts (most recently operating as a single unit) with central recessed entrances flanked by display windows. The second floor has three banks of three windows, each topped by a transom, with a cornice separating the second and third floors. The three bays of the upper floors are articulated by pilasters, each housing paired sash windows, with terra cotta panels between the floors and the word Olmsted in the terra cotta cornice.

The Olmsted Block (1645-1649 Main Street) was built in 1875 by John C. Olmsted, a leading businessman and banker in the city, and used as an office building. The Hixon Block (1653-1655 Main Street) was built in 1862 for John Hixon, a wholesale shoe and boot manufacturer. His premises was used by a paper products manufacturer after his death. The Albion Block (1657-1659) was built in 1866 as a boarding house; it was acquired in 1877 by the Bay State Paper Company, which gave the building its name and converted it into office space.

The three buildings were unified in 1927 according to plans drafted by Wallace Dibble for the Walter Young Realty Trust, which had purchased them over the preceding 20 years. The plan involved adding a fifth floor onto the Albion Block, and eliminating some stairways in order to increase the usable office space.

== See also ==
- National Register of Historic Places listings in Springfield, Massachusetts
- National Register of Historic Places listings in Hampden County, Massachusetts
