= Shelburne Falls and Colrain Street Railway =

Defunct railroad in Massachusetts, USA

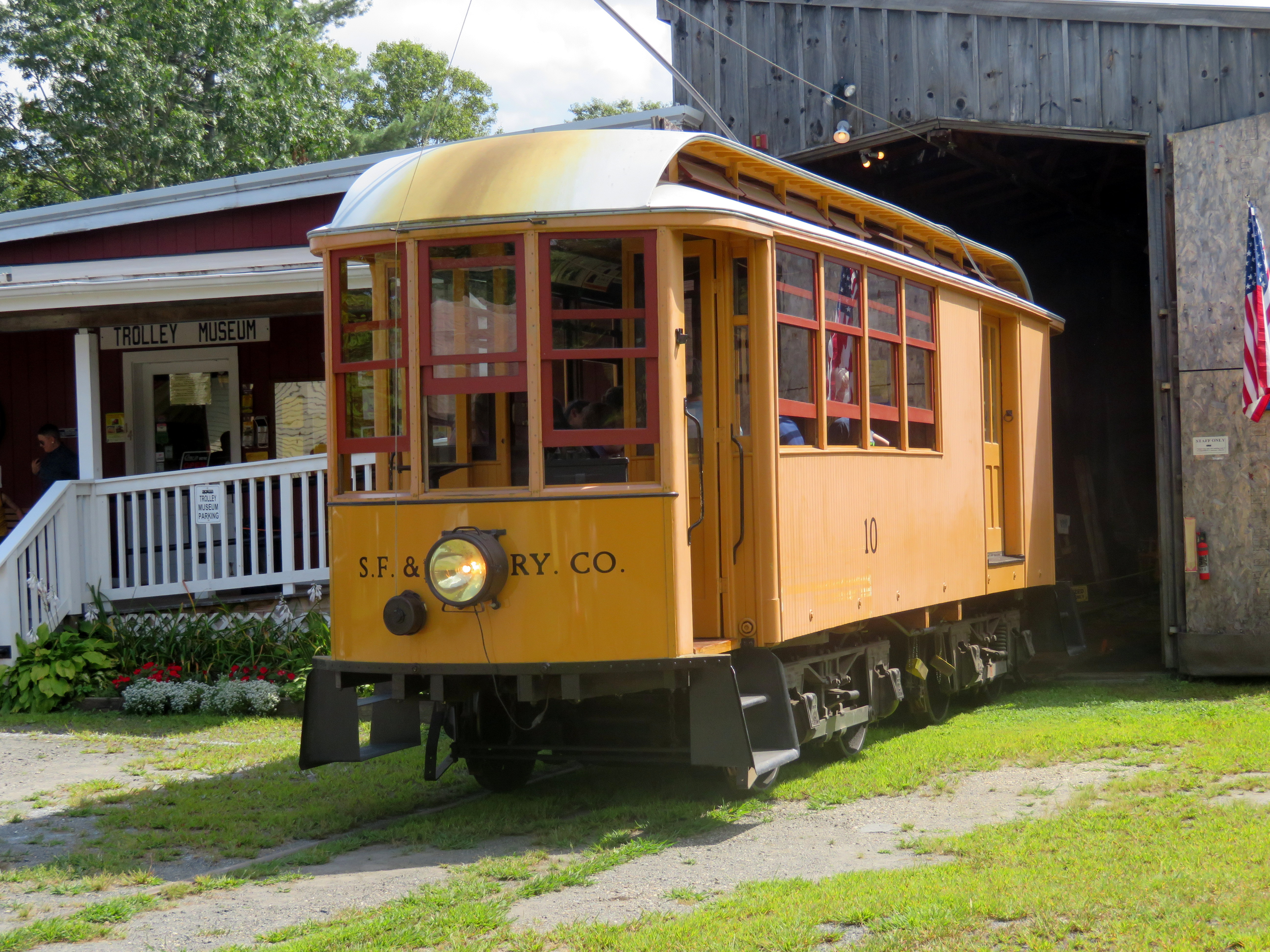
SF&C car #10 at the Shelburne Falls Trolley Museum

The Shelburne Falls and Colrain Street Railway was a rural trolley line that operated in the western Massachusetts towns of Buckland, Shelburne and Colrain from late 1896 to late 1927. Interchange was with the Boston and Maine Railroad and the New York, New Haven and Hartford Railroad at the south end of the line at the Boston and Maine's Shelburne Falls station, which was on the Buckland side of the village.

In 1927, faced with mounting debt, the SF&C ceased operation and was sold at foreclosure. The line was scrapped in 1928. The only surviving equipment of the SF&C is the 32'9" eight-wheel Combination Baggage-Passenger car #10, manufactured by the Wason company of Springfield, MA in 1896. The car has been fully restored to operating condition and today resides at the Shelburne Falls Trolley Museum at the site of the old Shelburne Falls depot. Brass models of this specific car were made by Fomras of Japan and imported to the US.

The SF&C bridge across the Deerfield River was not scrapped (as it carried a water main) and was instead restored and turned into a garden. Known as the Bridge of Flowers, it is a local tourist attraction.
