= Holyoke Street Railway =

- Logo of the Holyoke Street Railway Co. as a contractor for the PVTA c. 1978-1987

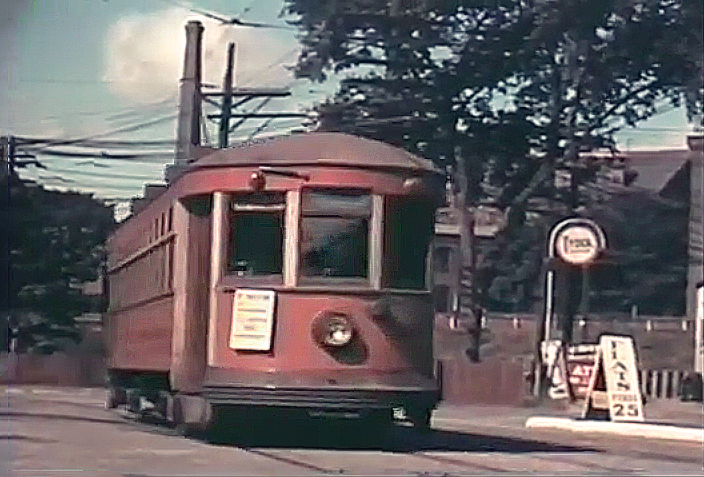

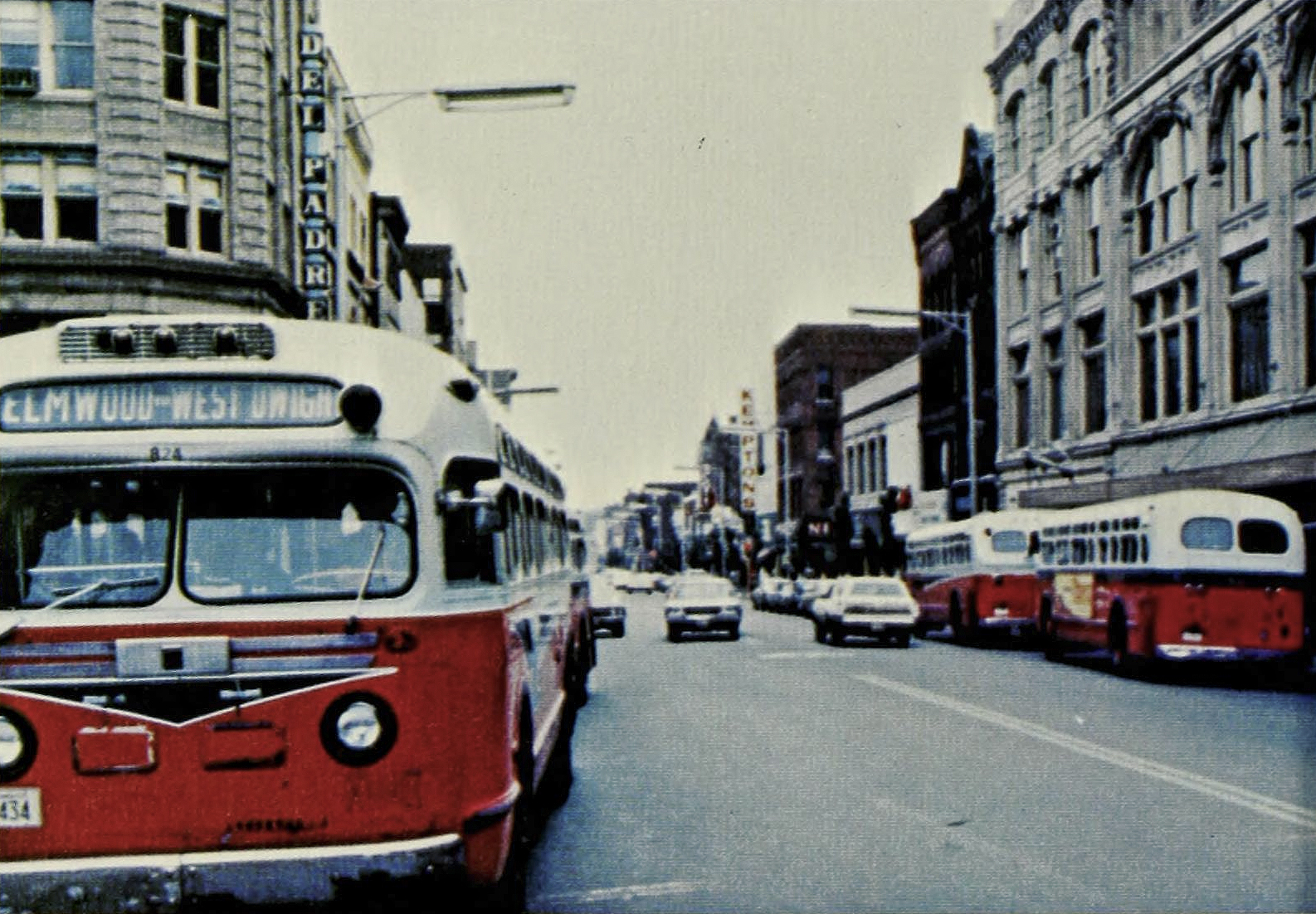
- The Holyoke Street Railway at one time provided both interurban rail (top, 1937) and bus service (bottom, 1973); the latter would replace the former however both remained in tandem service from 1921 to 1937.

Overview
- Owner: Holyoke Street Rwy. Co.
- Area served: Greater Holyoke; Chicopee; Granby; South Hadley; Westfield; West Springfield; Amherst and Sunderland Street Railway; Amherst; UMass Amherst; Pelham; Sunderland; Easthampton; Northampton
- Transit type: Light rail: Horsecar (1884–1891); Interurban (1891–1937); Bus (1921–1987)
- Chief executive: Louis D. Pellissier Jr. (1955–1991)
- Headquarters: 63 N Canal Street; Holyoke, MA; 01040-5836

Operation
- Began operation: September 24, 1884; August 7, 1891 (electrified); 1921 (bus)
- Ended operation: September 6, 1937 (rail); July 1, 1987 (bus); March 13, 1991 (dissolved)

Technical
- Track gauge: 4 ft 8 1/2 in (1,435 mm) standard gauge

The Holyoke Street Railway (HSR) was an interurban streetcar and bus system operating in Holyoke, Massachusetts as well as surrounding communities with connections in Amherst, Chicopee, Easthampton, Granby, Northampton, Pelham, South Hadley, Sunderland, Westfield, and West Springfield. Throughout its history the railway system shaped the cultural institutions of Mount Tom, being operator of the mountain's famous summit houses, one of which hosted President McKinley, the Mount Tom Railroad, and the trolley park at the opposite end of this funicular line, Mountain Park.

In the history of American railroad engineering, the system was the first in the United States to make use of exothermic welding, better known as thermite welding, to lay track for regular use. Railway engineer George E. Pellissier would not only be the first in the country to implement this now-standard operating procedure, but would further develop Hans Goldschmidt's welding process for the street railway, subsequently serving as an engineer and superintendent for the inventor's Goldschmidt Thermite Company before returning to Holyoke as an assistant general manager.

Operated by the Holyoke Street Railway Company, abbreviated on livery as the Hly. St. Ry. Co., the streetcar system began operation on September 24, 1884, consolidated with the Amherst and Sunderland Street Railway in 1907, and ceased operations as a streetcar operator in 1937. Regular bus operations began in 1921, and soon after the incorporation of the Pioneer Valley Transit Authority in 1977, the company began serving as a contract operator. This service continued until 1987, when a dispute between labor and management led regular bus service to an abrupt end, with would-be passengers still waiting at stops, on July 1, 1987. After four years of inactivity and with a municipal school bus contract failing to pass negotiations, the company liquidated its assets and had dissolved by 1991.

Today their former headquarters serves as the main facilities of the Holyoke Department of Public Works, now known as the Pellissier Building, for the family which owned and managed the system in its final decades. A second car barn of the Amherst and Sunderland Street Railway division functions as facilities for the town of Amherst's own Department of Public Works.

== Rail ==
=== Founding and early years ===
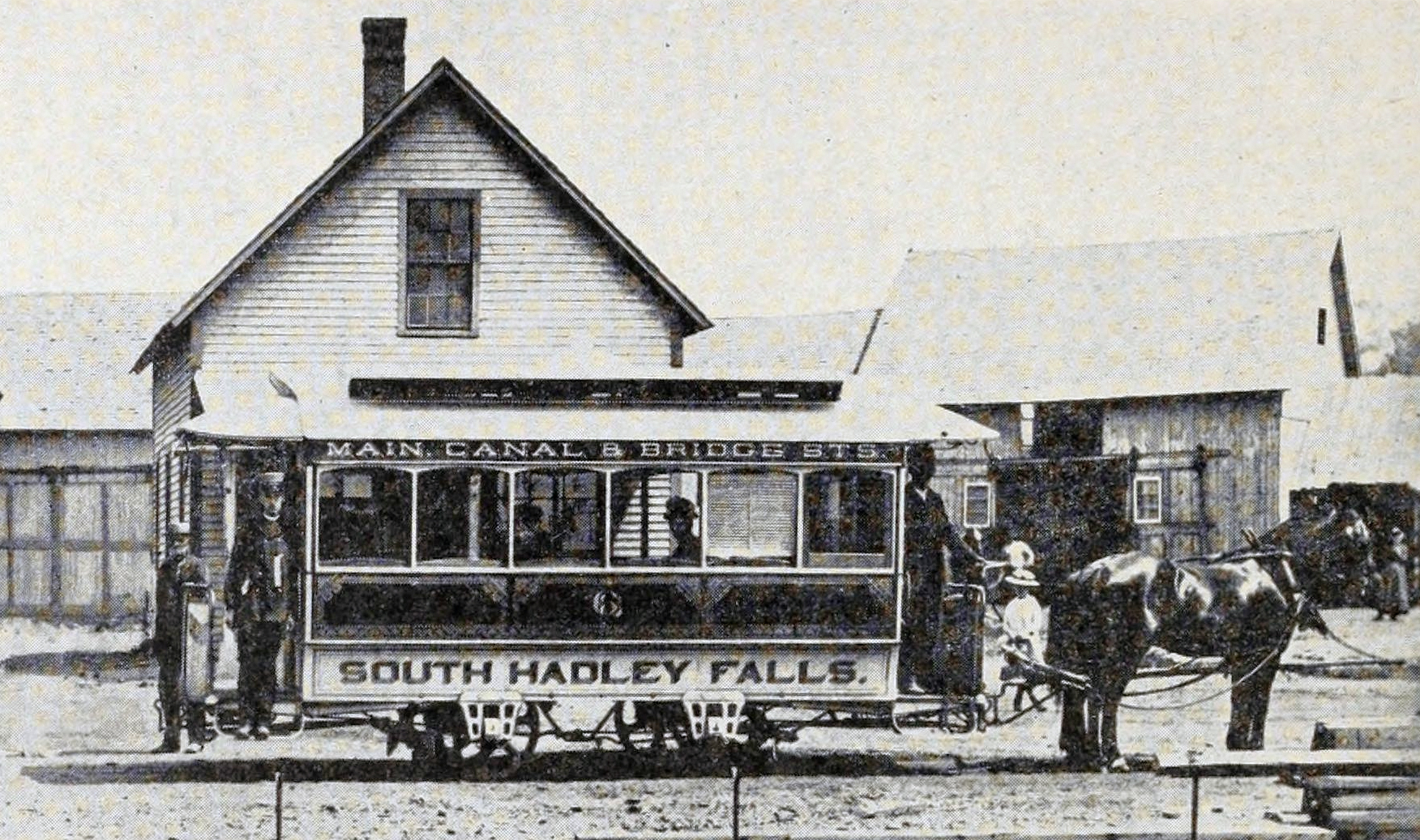
A horsecar on the South Hadley Falls line, c. 1890; horsecars would be used by the company from 1884 to 1891, when they were supplanted by electric streetcars

The Holyoke Street Railway Company held its first meeting on February 12, 1884, with a charter granted by the Office of Secretary of the Commonwealth Henry B. Pierce on June 11, 1884. According to the company's articles of association, it began with capital of $25,000 (≈$692,000 in 2017 USD) with 250 shares of $100 each issued, and was authorized to operate as a horsecar rail system in South Hadley and Holyoke. The company's first president was William A. Chase, and its first board of directors included two members who would later become mayors of Holyoke, Franklin P. Goodall and George H. Smith.

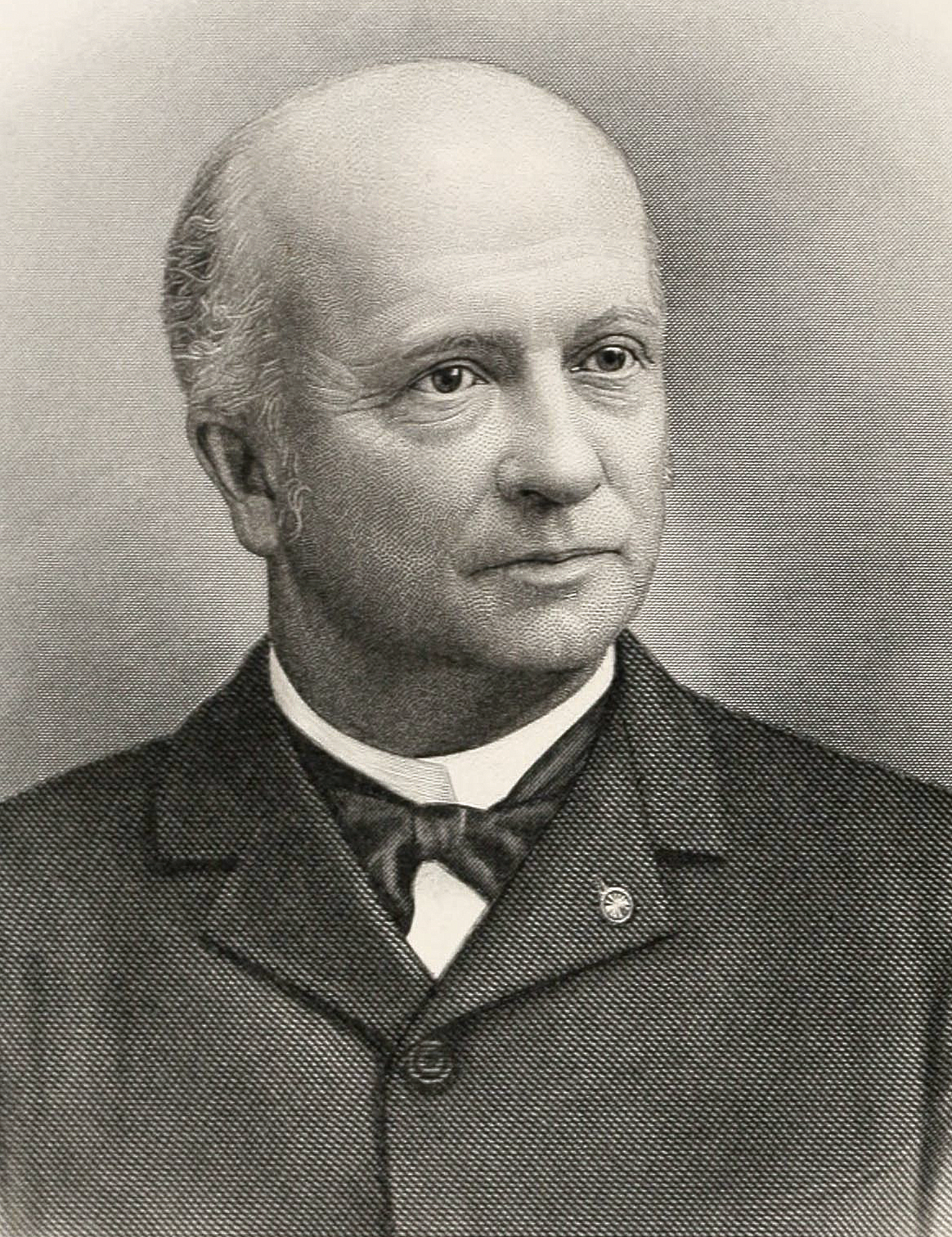
William S. Loomis, a key figure in system adoption and expansion, board member, eventual president and general manager of the company from 1887 until 1912

The system rapidly expanded its service capacity; in 1884, the system had 2 cars and 5 horses operating a line between Main Street in Holyoke and South Hadley Falls, by 1886 this had expanded to 3 other routes in Holyoke and the livery totaled at 15 cars and 56 horses. At the time it was commonplace for patrons to keep lumps or cubes of sugar in their pockets for often ornery horses. In its earliest years it met some resistance from Hampshire County commissioners and South Hadley selectmen, threatening to withdraw from South Hadley Falls in 1886 due to policies related to taxation and maintenance of roads and a former bridge connecting Holyoke across the Connecticut River. The following year, it was proposed the company stop every other car on the South Hadley route on the Holyoke side of where the Vietnam Memorial Bridge stands today, to halve taxes paid for use of the bridge there at that time. Public opinion on the South Hadley side of the river remained largely in favor of the company, however one writer for The Republican compared the ordeal to "child's play" due to lack of compromise by either. Some consensus was eventually reached during the construction of the bridge's successor, the Hadley-Holyoke Bridge by engineer Edward S. Shaw, as the railway company's lawyer would work with Hampshire and Hampden county commissioners to negotiate the bridge's width and location of the railway tracks.

In 1887, William S. Loomis, a former partner in the Holyoke Transcript-Telegram, approached the railway's board of directors proposing that their line from City Hall and Maple Street be extended further into Elmwood. Loomis had previously purchased a large tract of land there which he planned to develop into a streetcar suburb. His calls for expansion were rejected however by the railway company, but ultimately working with connections from his time as a newspaper magnate, he would buy a controlling share in the company. Upon purchasing this stock, Loomis began working on the laying out of additional tracks along with roads on his own land, the former Horace Brown Farm which would become the blocks around modern-day Elmwood Avenue, as well as Laurel Street/Brown Avenue across Northampton Street. By 1889 the railwork had been completed to Elmwood, and in 1890 to the Highlands. During his time with the railway Loomis would serve as treasurer as well as general manager of the company, and is generally credited as a key figure in the expansion of the railway system to the two other neighborhoods, Oakdale and Springdale.

=== Electrification and expansion ===
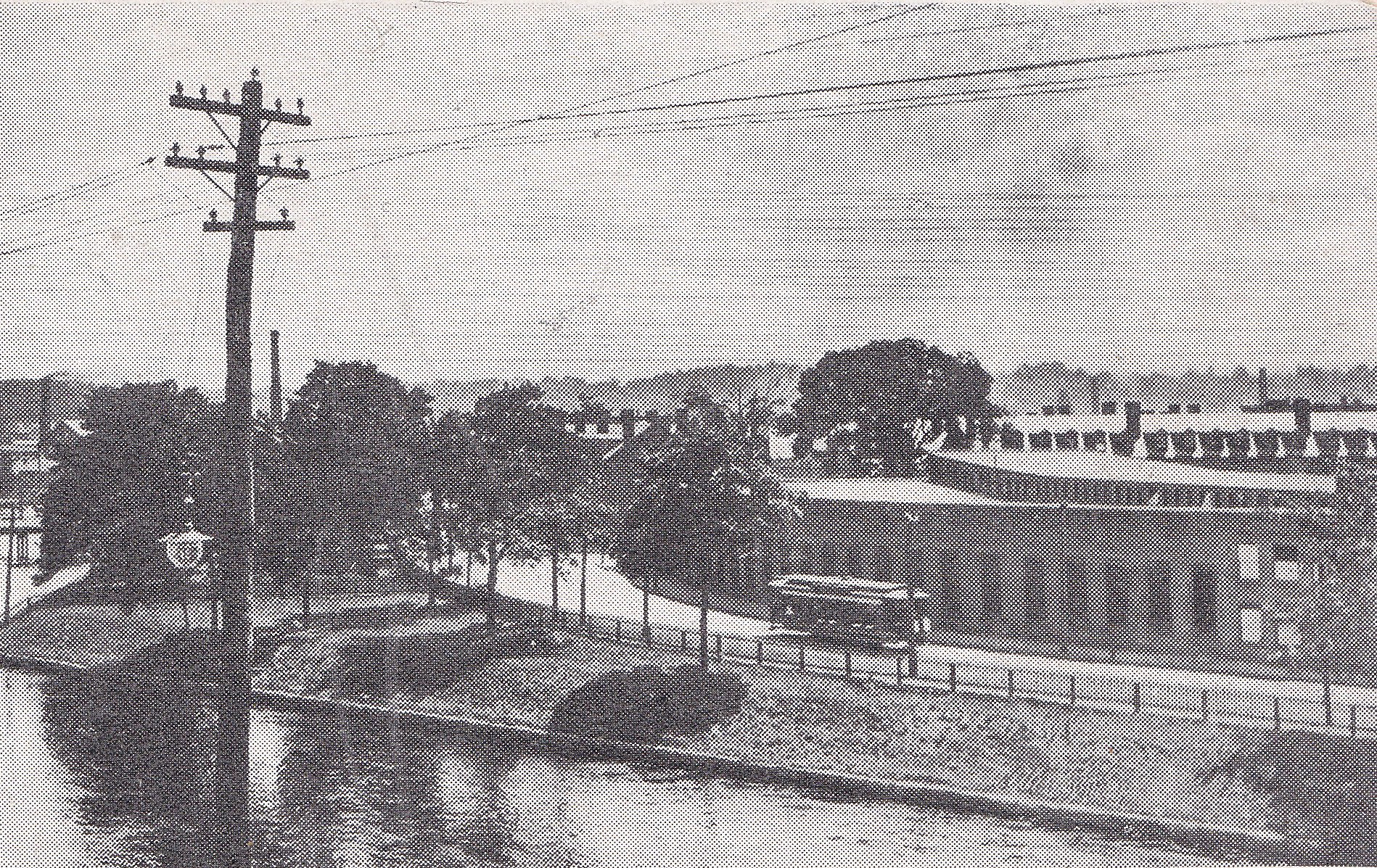
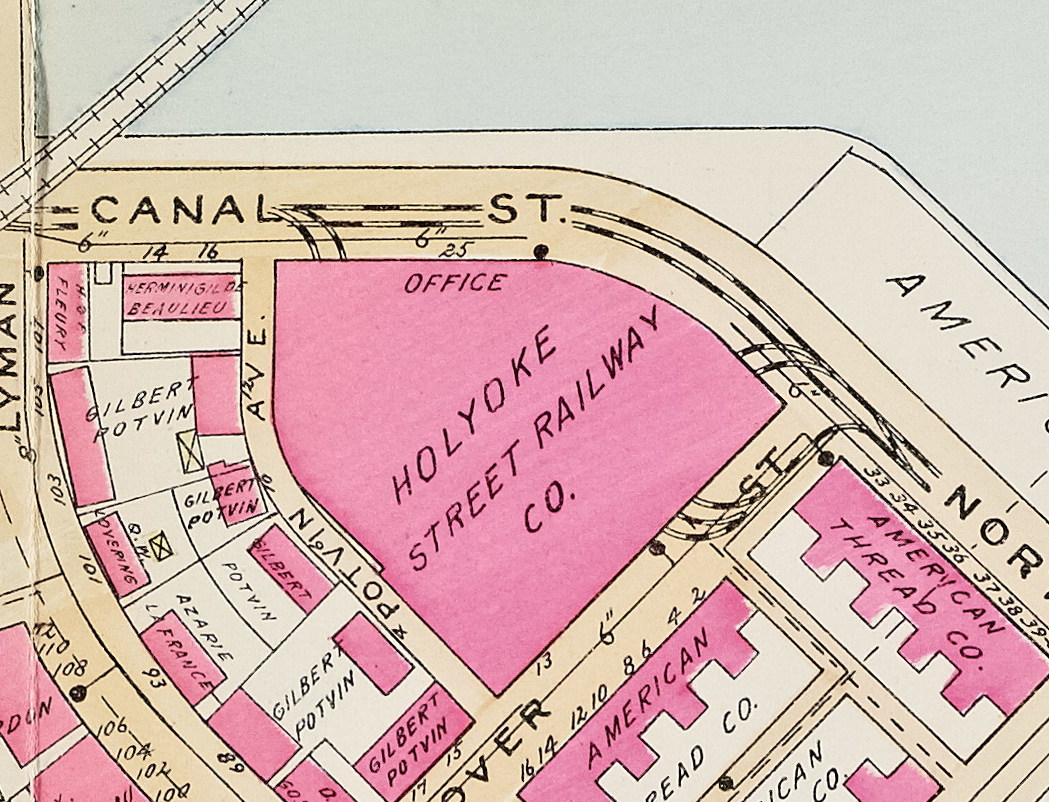
The railway company's first car barn and offices, used circa 1895–1914
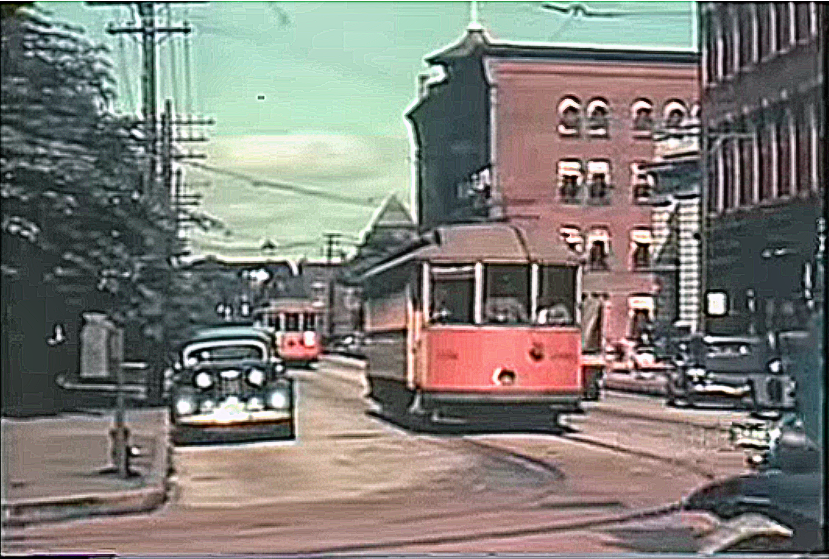
Early ticket logo for the railway, c. 1929; trams passing Race and Dwight Street, with the Flatiron Building visible in the background, 1937

The railway's first electric car ran on the South Hadley Falls line at about 2pm on August 8, 1891, and by the end of that year all routes had been electrified. The very first run however proved to not be a resounding success as aside from Loomis and the board of directors, no passengers climbed aboard on the maiden run of an electric car; it was not until the return trip back over the bridge from South Hadley that one Jesse L. Bliss became the new system's first passenger. Bliss himself would go on to try to become a driver of the cars, however reportedly jumped one of the trolleys off the tracks on his own first run.

The electrification of old horse trams came within less than a decade for the Holyoke Street Railway and in Massachusetts as a whole. When the railway's first electric cars appeared in 1891, at the time about a third of all street railway lines in Massachusetts had electric overhead systems. However by the turn of the century not only were these cars commonplace in the Holyoke system, they comprised more than 99% of such streetcar lines in the Commonwealth.

Another feature that typified railways in the late nineteenth and early twentieth centuries was trolley parks; in the years immediately after the electrification of the system, Loomis purchased a large lot on the southeastern side of Mount Tom and in 1894 purchased a post-and-beam stage for performers there. In 1895 the railway was extended to this site, and by 1897 the area was officially chartered at Mountain Park.

In his 1908 report to Mayor Nathan P. Avery, landscape architect and planner Frederick Law Olmsted Jr. urged the city to work to more closely align its planning with the development of the street railway in a working relationship, saying a liaison or authority ought to be established in determining future extensions and improvements in the electric railway lines operating in the city, stressing it would yield some of the most economical growth of housing capacity in tandem with the grid system. By 1920, prior to the first bus routes, the railway had a reported 71.5 miles of track and 18,000,000 fares in that same year.

=== Pioneering thermite rail welding ===
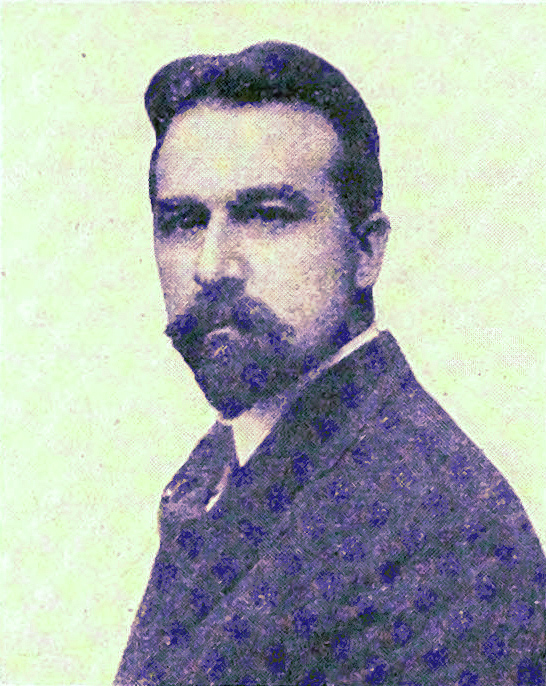
George E. Pellissier, engineer and manager for the Holyoke Street Railway as well as the Goldschmidt Thermit Company

As a transportation system, the railway also held at least one unprecedented piece of technology prior to its numerous competitors in the early 20th century- thermite welding. During the 1890s in Germany, Hans Goldschmidt developed the modern process for exothermic welding for railways. This process, now an international standard in railway construction, was first used commercially in tram lines in Essen, Germany in 1899. Over the next several years other cities including Leeds and Singapore would adopt this construction method, and in 1904 its inventor would open the Goldschmidt Thermit Company offices in New York City. While development of this process continued, an engineering student at Worcester Polytechnic Institute, George E. Pellissier, followed Goldschmidt's work closely and approached the Holyoke Street Railway proposing that they use the new thermite process for their own lines. Soon after the railway ordered 160 joints to be placed on an approximately one mile (1.6 km)-long tract of rail on Main Street, and on August 8, 1904 Holyoke became the first rail line in the United States to lay track with the process. That same year Hartford would join the ranks as the second in country.

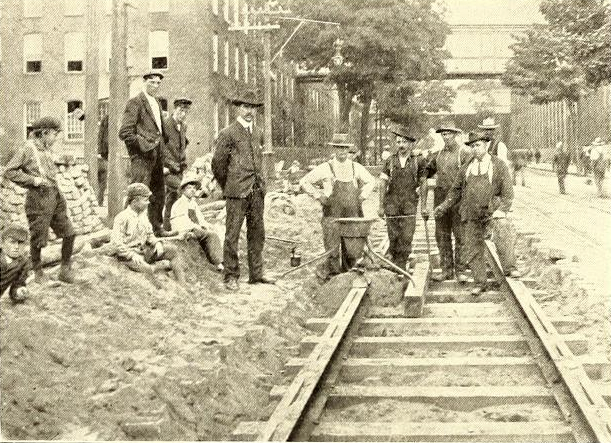
Railway workers and George Pellissier (center left) stand next to a thermite crucible prior to ignition during the laying of the first tracks in the United States using the thermite weld technique, August 1904

While Hartford would be met with some issues due to what was later described as a rushed installation, the Holyoke installation served as a proof-of-concept for the advantages of the method. With thermite welding, a small crew of unskilled laborers with no prior knowledge of welding or specialty metalwork could be sent out with a crucible, pre-made molds, and a set amount of thermite. For railway companies the new technique would lead to a more reliable and inexpensive method of laying down new tracks that would make future system expansion more practical than bolted or welded separate joint techniques used up to that time.

This represented the beginning of Pellissier's career with the railway company, as he would obtain a full-time engineer position upon graduation and went on to present his work to the American Street and Interurban Railway Association in 1905. The Holyoke engineer would not only serve as merely Goldschmidt's first American customer, but rather Pellissier would go on to work for the inventor's American company in New York, designing their Jersey City welding plant and also contributing improvements to the thermite installation process. In 1910 the Holyoke Street Railway, which had since used thermite for regular work, served as an urban laboratory for Pellissier's refinements on the process for the Goldschmidt Company, during which he tested a new technique for whole-rail welds, an improvement contributing to the development of continuous welded rail.

=== Extended system ===
==== Amherst and Sunderland Street Railway ====
Amherst & Sunderland Street Railway

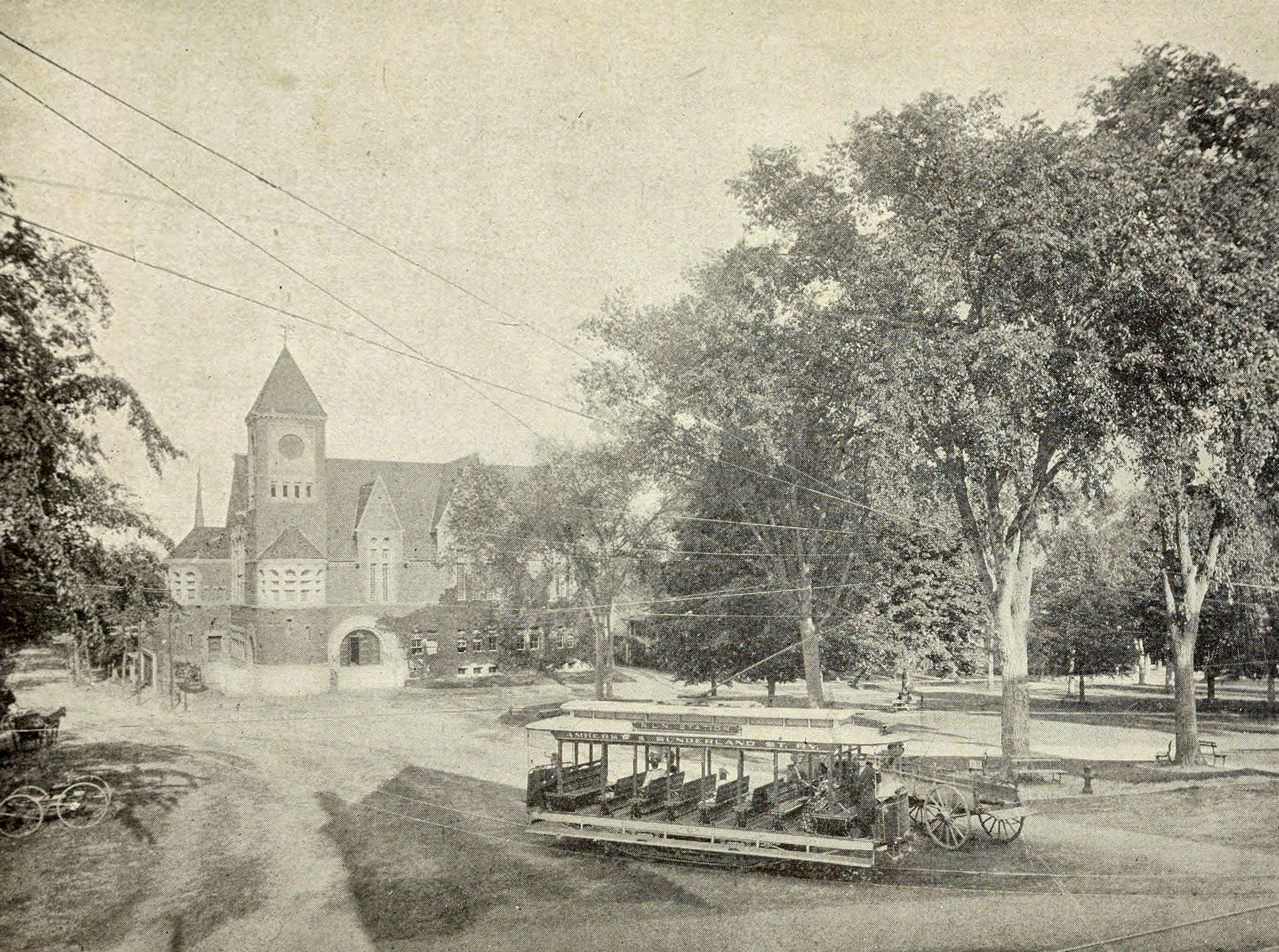
- An Amherst & Sunderland streetcar passes Town Hall in Amherst Center, 1903

Overview
- Area served: Amherst; Sunderland; Pelham; South Hadley

Operation
- Began operation: June 16, 1897; July 30, 1907 (consolidation)
- Ended operation: 1932 (rail; name dropped for buses)

Technical
- Track gauge: 4 ft 8 1/2 in (1,435 mm) standard gauge

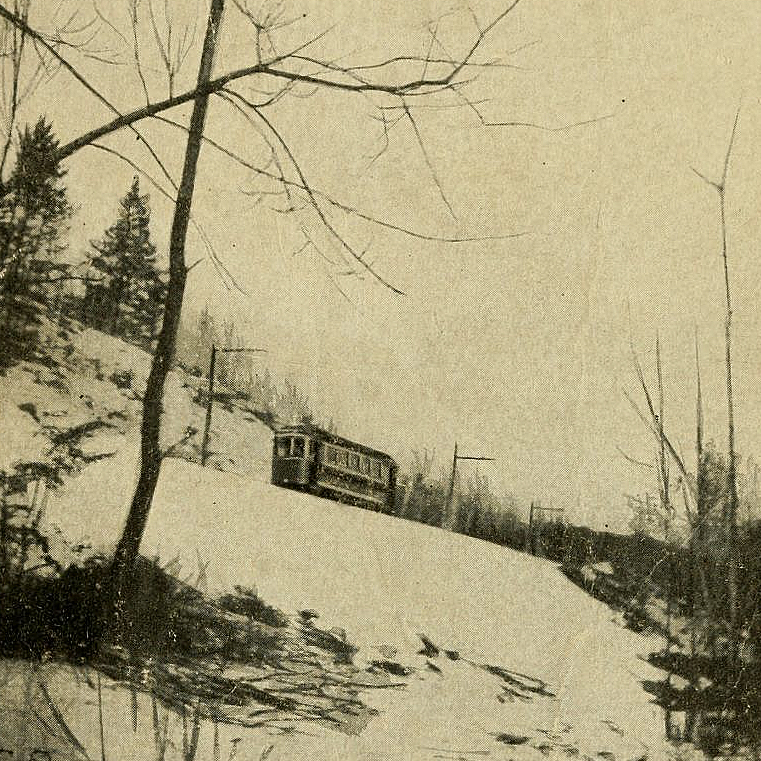
An Amherst & Sunderland car passes through The Notch of the Holyoke Range, 1903

The Amherst and Sunderland Street Railway was an interurban streetcar system that operated in Amherst, Sunderland, Pelham, Granby, and South Hadley, Massachusetts. From 1897 until 1932, trolleys operated between Sunderland, the Massachusetts Agricultural College (now UMass Amherst), and connected with the Holyoke Street Railway's system at "The Notch" after 1902. This rail line, providing freight and passenger service, was built by the short-lived Hampshire Street Railway specifically to connect the other two systems; the Hampshire Street Railway would lease the line to the Holyoke railway in 1905, which ultimately consolidated with it, along with Amherst & Sunderland, in 1907. After the merger the name was kept as a legacy and lines to the north of the Holyoke Range were referred to as the Amherst and Sunderland Division of the Holyoke Street Railway. While the HSR would continue operations in Amherst as a bus carrier, after trolley service ceased in 1932 the A&S name was dropped altogether.

The company was initially chartered on February 27, 1896, but was beset by legal troubles in its initial formation. Among these setbacks was the sale of shares under the name the "Amherst Street Railway Company", which legally did not exist, prompting the board to have to take up entirely new shares from the same parties that they had first sold them to. This issue had apparently arisen from an early board meeting during which a stockholder from Sunderland moved to append the town name to the railway company's, however none of the members had new paperwork printed to reflect this. This problem was further complicated when then-president of the board, Levi Stockbridge, revealed the state railroad commissioners refused to recognize the company, as its charter had been accepted in the minutes of a meeting called by a single board member, rather than the entirety of the charter members. Despite predictions by some that this was the end of the enterprise, Stockbridge urged that if the group did not organize to build the street railway, there were several other syndicates which would; by the end of their next meeting the group was able to recollect all necessary shares.

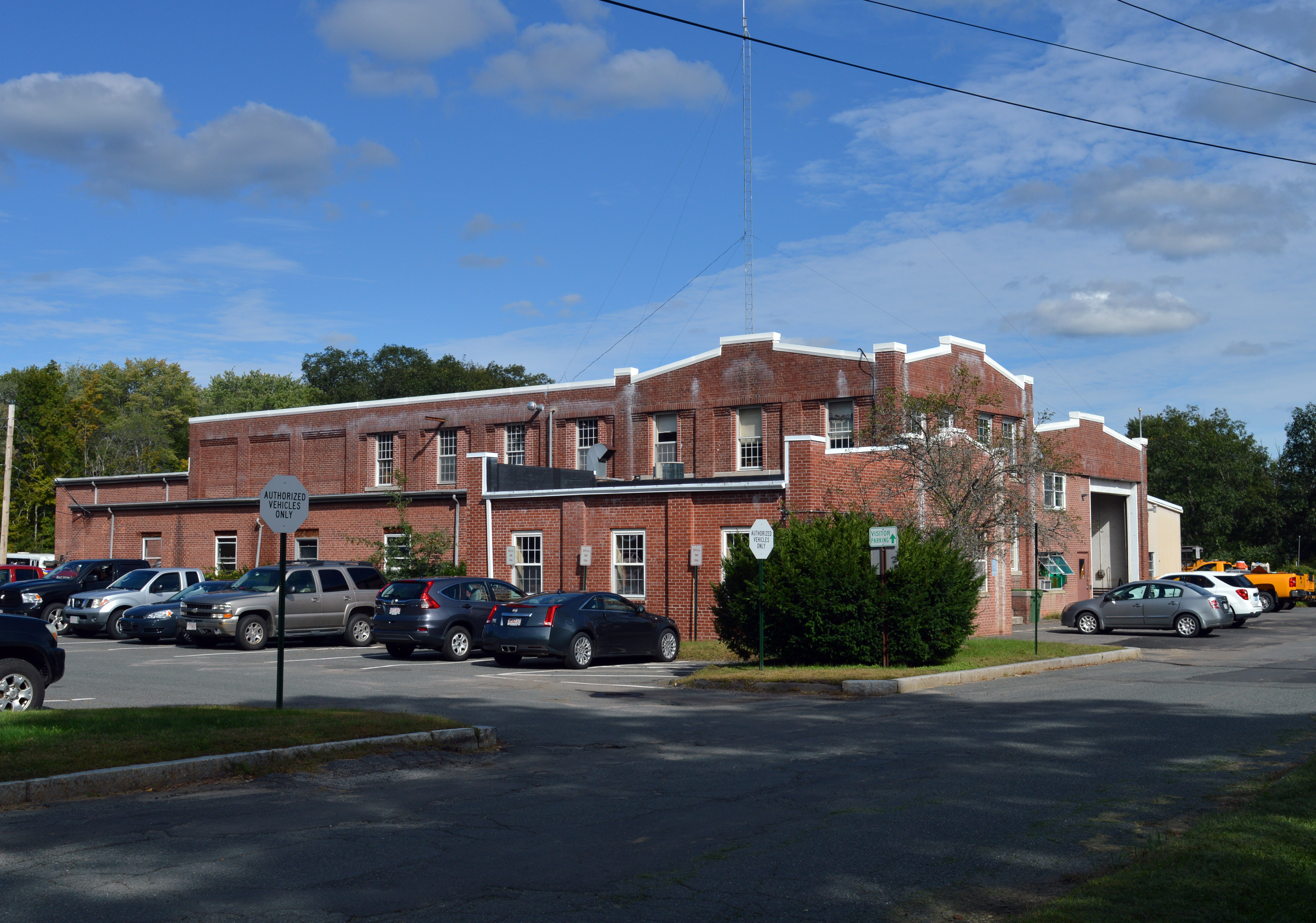
The former Amherst car barn, the town's present Dept. of Public Works, until its subsequent demolition in the near future

Following an extended period of discussion over the specific location of the tracks, work commenced in the laying of line in April 1897, and by June of that year the first trolleys were operational. While Stockbridge remains notable among founding figures of the street railway, his role as president of the company was limited to its first year, a greater credit was due to Walter D. Cowles, a member of the board and subsequent president of the company, whose family stored the streetcars in car barn facilities on the grounds of their lumber business in the railways earliest years. In 1897 the railway began to see competition from the Northampton and Amherst Railway, later known as the Connecticut Valley Street Railway, as it connected Northampton to Amherst, through Hadley. Despite outcry from the Amherst & Sunderland Street Railway and its interests, by the end of 1897 the competitor had been given access and some consideration was given to franchise. In response to this, the railway would attempt to expand its own holdings in Hadley, building a new line through Mill Valley to the Hadley border in the following year.

The railway's ties with the Holyoke Street Railway began in 1902 when the stockholders and directors voted to increase the capital stock of the company to construct a line across the Notch in the Holyoke Range and connect with the Hampshire Street Railway system at the Granby town line. The Hampshire Street Railway, organized that same year, served as a collaboration of the interests of the Amherst and Holyoke railways, with Walter Cowls and William Loomis elected as sitting directors in the following year at an annual meeting at the Holyoke company's offices. In the following year the railway began advertising jointly with the Holyoke Street Railway as the best way to reach "The Famous Amherst 'Notch'", and by 1905 the entirety of the system was leased to Holyoke.

The loose association between the Amherst and Sunderland system and Holyoke's became official when in 1907 the company moved to buy all stock of the Amherst company, consolidating it with the acquired Hampshire system to create the Amherst and Sunderland Division of the Holyoke Street Railway. In the next several years the HSR would further develop the Orient Springs stop in West Pelham as a picnic ground, as well as construct new infrastructure such as permanent stops, the last of which stood at UMass Amherst from 1911 until 2012 when it was razed by a contractor. The car barn on the Cowls property was maintained until the North Amherst route switched to bus service in 1928. The only extant structure related to the Amherst division today is the former South Amherst Car Barn which first entered service in 1917. Increasing competition from buses and cars would lead this structure to serve for less than 15 years, with all Amherst & Sunderland rail service ceasing in 1932. The facility was sold to the town government in 1934, and has been used as the Amherst Department of Public Works offices and garage since that time. In July 2019 it was announced that the trolley barn would be razed for a modern fire department headquarters.

==== Mount Tom Railroad ====
Mount Tom Railroad

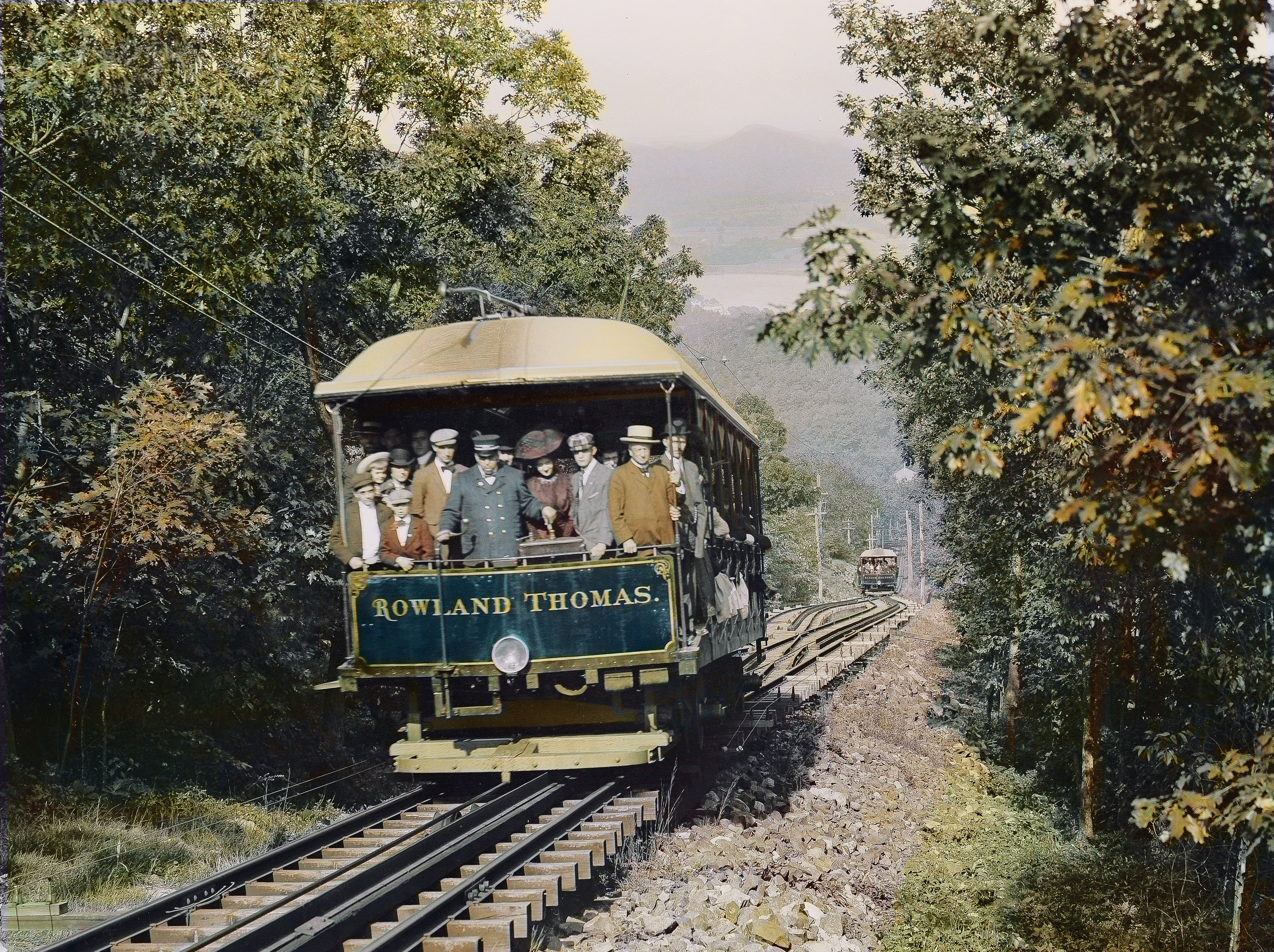
- The Rowland Thomas funicular car ascends Mount Tom, as the Elizur Holyoke makes its descent in the background, c. 1912

Overview
- Area served: Mount Tom, Holyoke, Massachusetts
- Transit type: Funicular

Operation
- Began operation: June 17, 1897
- Ended operation: 1938

Technical
- Track gauge: 4 ft 8 1/2 in (1,435 mm) standard gauge
System map
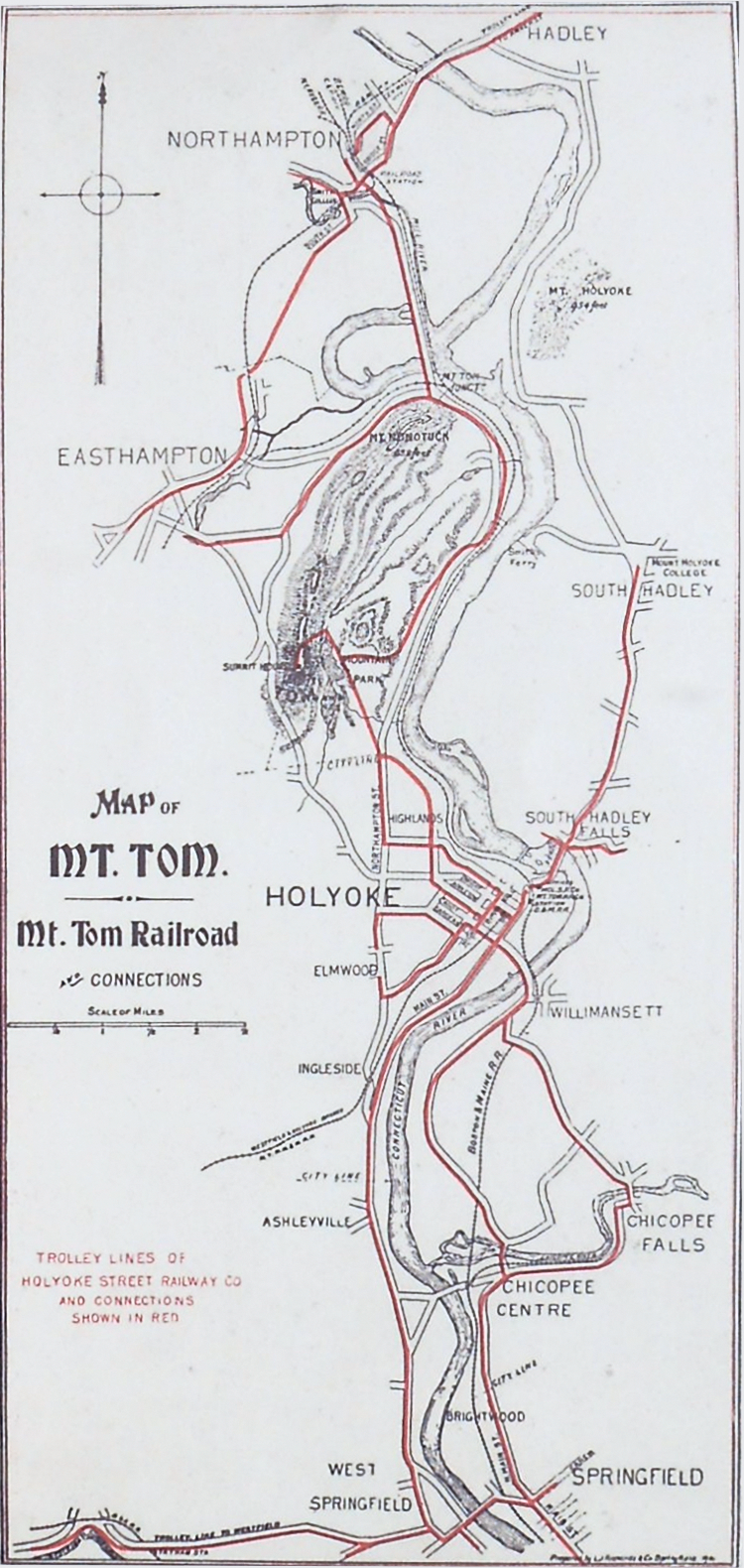

The Mount Tom Railroad, also known as the Mount Tom Railway, was a funicular mountain railway on the northeast slope of Mount Tom in Holyoke, Massachusetts which was operated by the Holyoke Street Railway from 1897 until 1938. Built in 1897, the railway quickly gained national fame when it was visited by President William McKinley who remarked upon the beauty of the mountainside. It was closely identified with the Summit Houses which adorned the mountaintop with the most ornate first two designed by local architect James A. Clough. At the foot of the railway sat Mountain Park, which connected the cable railway with the Holyoke Street Railway system.

For several years William Loomis and the rest of the board had pursued the idea of a mountain railway to connect the summit to their system, with notices published as far back as 1893, soon after the lines had been electrified. By June 6, 1896, the Mount Tom Railroad Company had been incorporated, with Loomis serving as president of both it as a separate entity and the HSR as a whole. The location of the railway, now a service road and paved trail, was determined early in planning as ideally running up the side of the mountain diagonally to follow the contours of a ravine, thus minimizing needed blasting and grading work. The rails construction and design was said to be based on the Lookout Mountain Incline Railway's, having a single track with one passing loop between the funicular's alternating cars.

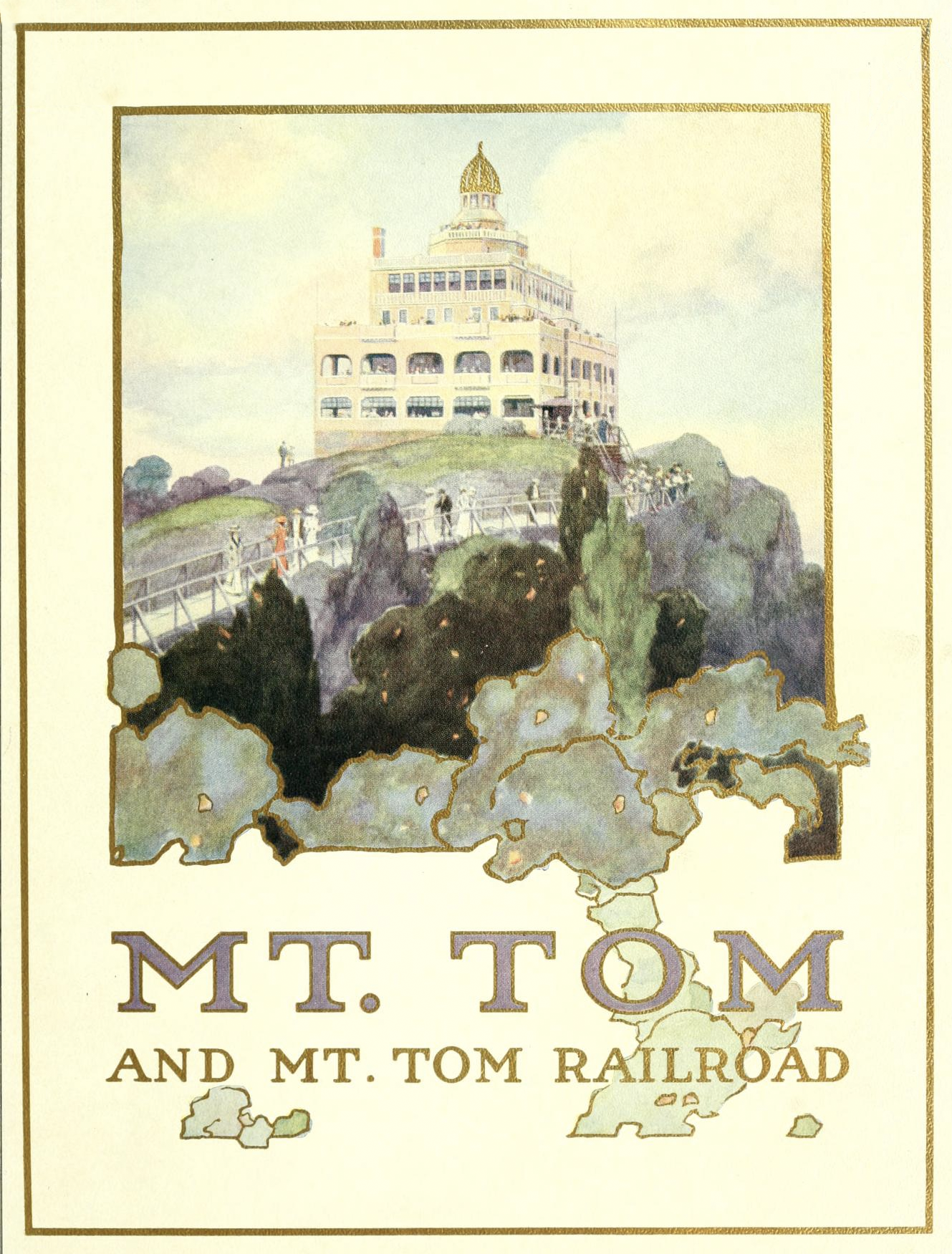
The second Summit House, built shortly after the first burned in 1900

Construction began in early 1897 under the Charles F. Parker Company of New York City, and by June, the Mount Tom Railroad Company had officiated a 25 year operating lease with the Holyoke Street Railway. The inaugural ride took place on June 17, 1897, with a number of city officials, railway employees, and officials of the Wason Manufacturing Company being the first passengers. The railway briefly rose to national fame when President McKinley and First Lady Ida Saxton rode to the summit house on June 20, 1899.

At one point toward the end of the railroad's existence, there was some discussion of using it to pull skiers up the mountainside. This planned ski resort would not ultimately materialize however and it would not be until 1962 that the Mount Tom Ski Area would open. Following a period of decline and financial difficulties by its parent company, the Mount Tom Railroad cable railway was sold and dismantled in 1938.

== Buses ==
External image
- Holyoke Street Railway Bus at City Hall, Kodak photoslide, August 1958

Shoulder patch worn by bus drivers, c. 1955-1976

Despite building new carbarns specifically for its rail fleet, the company gradually began introducing buses to their routes beginning in 1921, in response to ridership changes after the First World War. "Motorization" rapidly accelerated for Holyoke and its competitors in the late 1930s in response to new highway construction which removed old track, and the last trolley cars ceased service in 1937, with all but one of the 50 remaining cars burned as an expedient way to obtain the remaining metal for scrap. By the 1960s the number of buses would peak at a fleet of 75, with 100 full-time drivers.

By the time the Pioneer Valley Transit Authority was initially chartered in 1974, Holyoke and many of its former traction counterparts had already been seeing dramatically reduced revenue. With the new regional authorities being established, the Massachusetts Legislature issued a survey to all bus carriers in the state with regular passenger service. In 1972, the Company reportedly $1,042,773 in revenue but had operating costs of $1,000,808 with $762,449 in outstanding debt. It had the third most passengers per year of all bus lines surveyed with 2,668,326 passengers carried in 1972, eclipsed only by the Worcester Bus Company and Springfield Street Railway. Nevertheless more than half of the company's revenue came from school bus contracts, which allowed the system to maintain its route service at that time. The continued closure of factories and mills, and the prevalence of automobiles, reduced usage substantially and the company would ultimately join the Pioneer Valley Transit Authority in 1977 as a contractor rather than competing with the new system.

== Legacy ==
President McKinley and first lady Ida McKinley leave the railway's Mount Tom Summit House, June 20, 1899

Today few vestiges remain of the former streetcar or bus systems, and the railway is best remembered for its Mount Tom Summit House and inclined railway, which was visited by President William McKinley in 1899. Following a series of fires and the Great Depression, the third and final summit house was disassembled after a vandalism incident in 1938.

While routes have changed in the decades since the railway's closure, the PVTA continues to provide bus service in Holyoke as well as all other municipalities previously covered by the former carrier's services. Due to several recessions in the 1980s, the railway's former amusement park Mountain Park shuttered the same year as buses ceased, in 1987. This year coincides with the Railway Company's closure however the two were unaffiliated by that time; Louis Pellissier Sr. had sold the amusement park to the Collins family of Lincoln Park in 1952, they assumed operations the following year until its closure. The certificates of public convenience and necessity (CPCNs) the company had been issued for routes in 13 towns were transferred to Terrien Transportation in December 1988; Russ Ward, a former manager of Holyoke's bus fleet went on to work for Terrien and soon after the company adopted the King Ward name, operating today as a charter company, now known as King Gray.

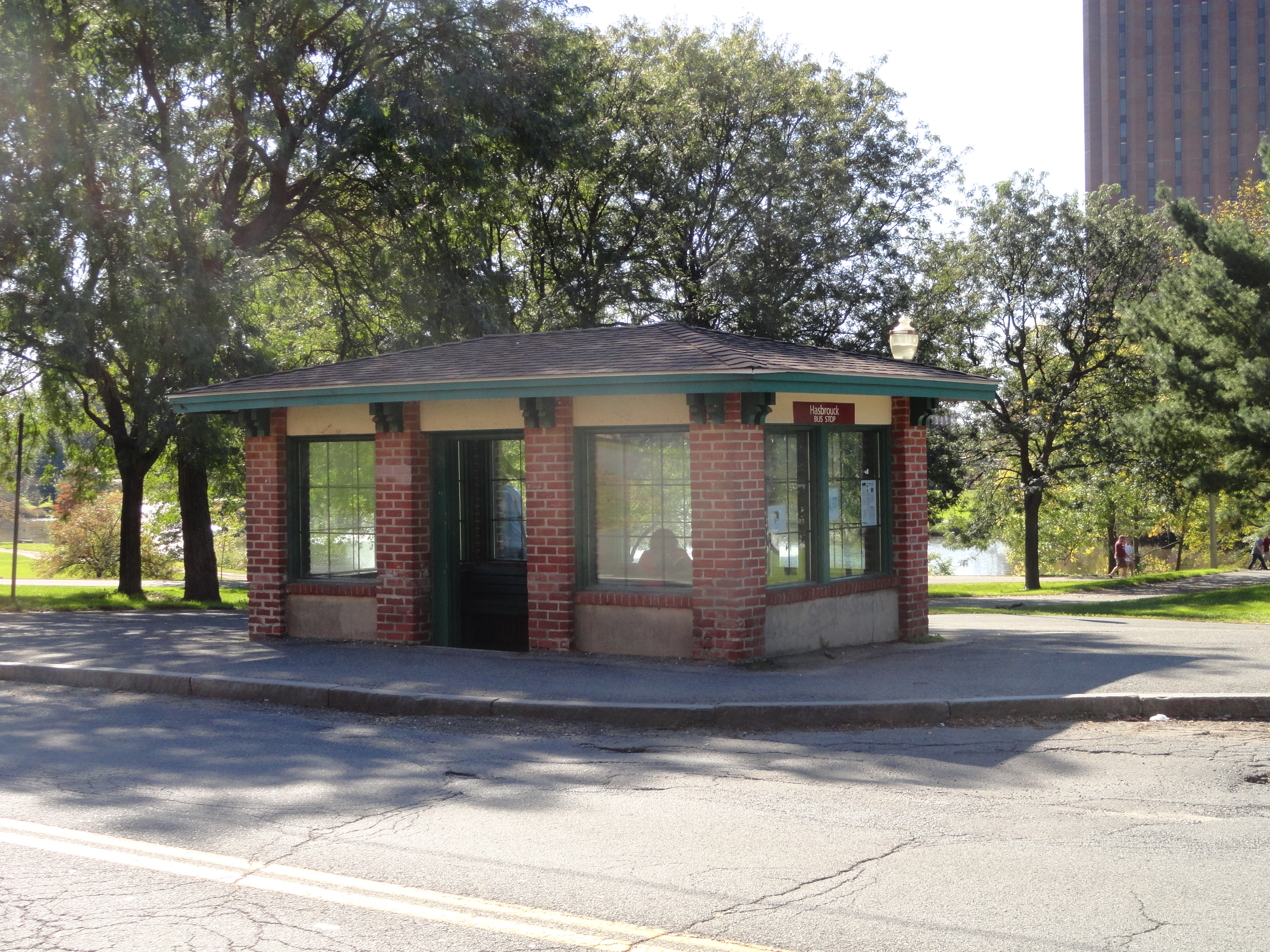
The last trolley station at UMass in 2011; the simple structure done in the American Craftsman style was demolished during construction of an academic building the following year.

Of the original trolley stops, virtually all had been replaced by modern plexiglass bus stops by the time of the company's demise; the one exception had been a simple brick and glass structure built by the company for its Amherst and Sunderland line in 1911. This stop remained entirely intact and was used by the PVTA until it was destroyed by a contractor without university authorization in 2012; the university did not rebuild the 8-column waiting station, citing costs and the area's "modern use for today’s students".

During the motorization period replacing the interurban system with bus lines, the company sold its Amherst and Sunderland Branch car barn in 1934, only 17 years after its construction, to the Town of Amherst's Dept. of Public Works. While several additions have been added over the years, the municipality has kept certain attention to detail, including keeping remaining tracks in place within the building. In recent years consideration has been given to a more modern facility but as of 2018, the car barn was still used by the town government. In 2019 it was announced that the town intends to raze the car barn and replace it with a new fire department headquarters. An homage to the Amherst & Sunderland lines history can also be found in the "Trolley Barn" development in North Amherst; while redeveloped in proximity to the line the building, done in the style of a car barn, was built in 2014.

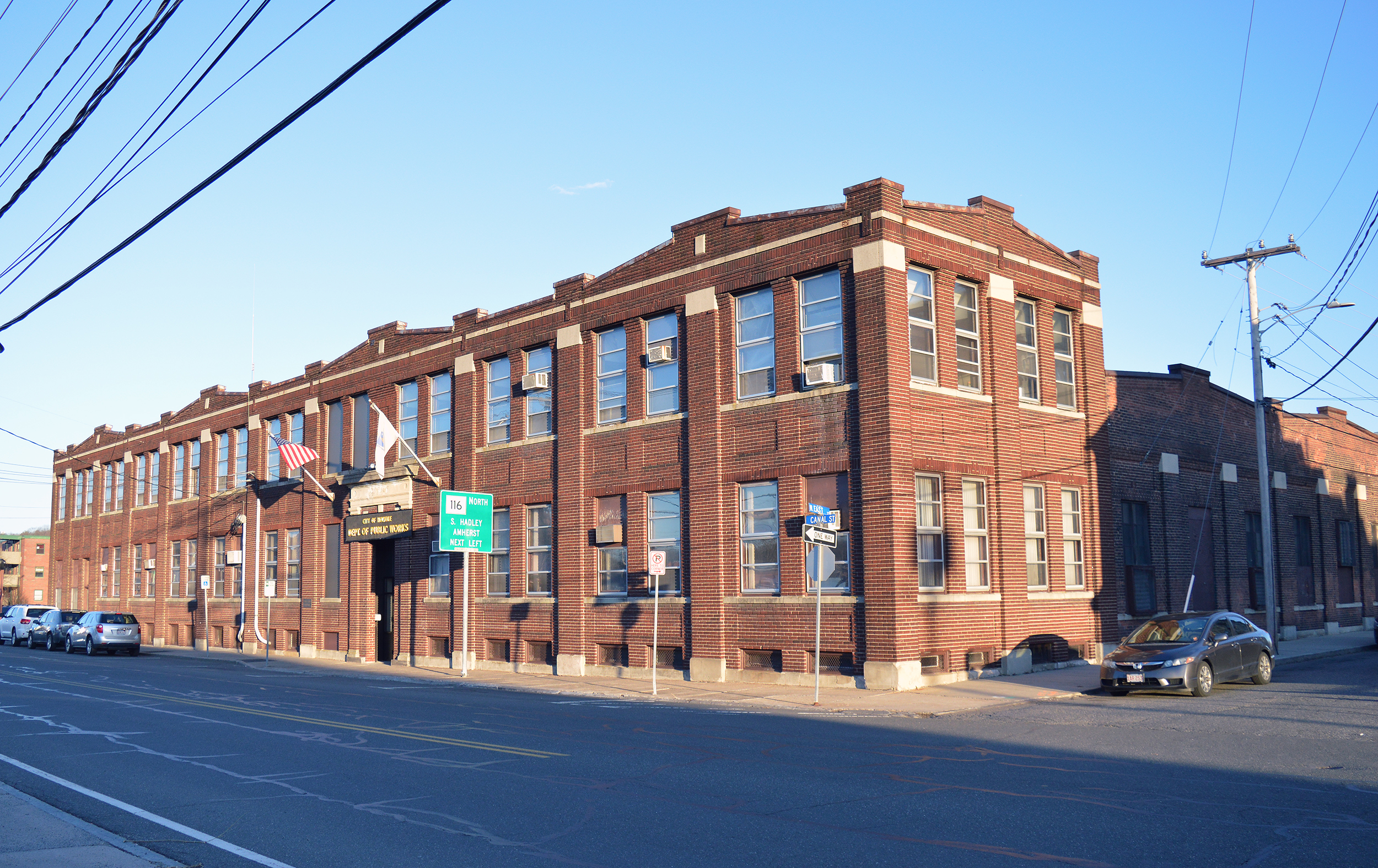
The former headquarters of the railway company, presently serving as the offices, garage, and trash transfer facilities of the Holyoke Dept. of Public Works.

Borrowing from the precedent set by Amherst for its car barn, the City of Holyoke placed a request for proposal for a feasibility study in July 1988 for re-purposing the company's offices and central garage on Canal St, and assumed ownership of the building on December 21, 1988. The car barn and offices, designed by the Samuel M. Green Company and built in 1914 by Casper Ranger Construction, has since been rechristened the Pellissier Building for its previous owners, and converted into Holyoke's Department of Public Works headquarters, maintenance shop, and waste transfer station.

No complete Holyoke Street Railway tram is known to exist today, however the Shore Line Trolley Museum's "Preserved North American Electric Cars Roster" (PNAECR) survey states the wooden cabin for one such car remains in Holyoke in the private collection of James Curran at The Wherehouse banquet hall. Additionally four of the railway's Wason open-air cars were sold and repainted for the Blue Hill Street Railway of Canton in 1909, however fate of that livery remains unknown.

== Gallery ==
Gallery

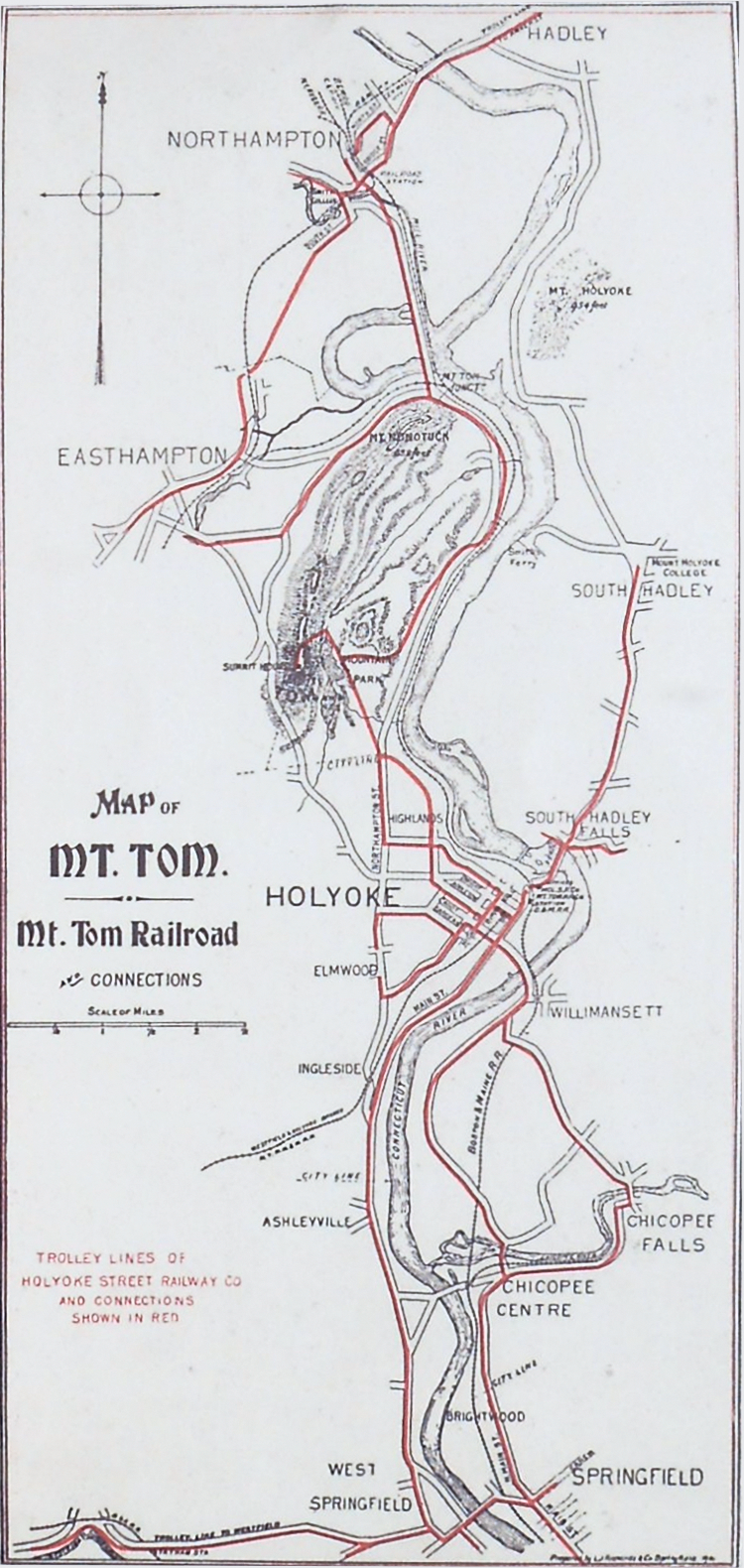
Map of the former Mt. Tom Railroad of Holyoke, Massachusetts, and its major routes around the southern Pioneer Valley.

== See also ==
- Pioneer Valley Transit Authority (PVTA), contemporary transit provider
- Shelburne Falls Trolley Museum, local transit museum of Shelburne Falls and Colrain Street Railway
- Wason Manufacturing Company, former Springfield-based manufacturer of rail livery for the HSR
