= Bridge of Flowers (bridge) =

Bridge in Shelburne Falls, Massachusetts

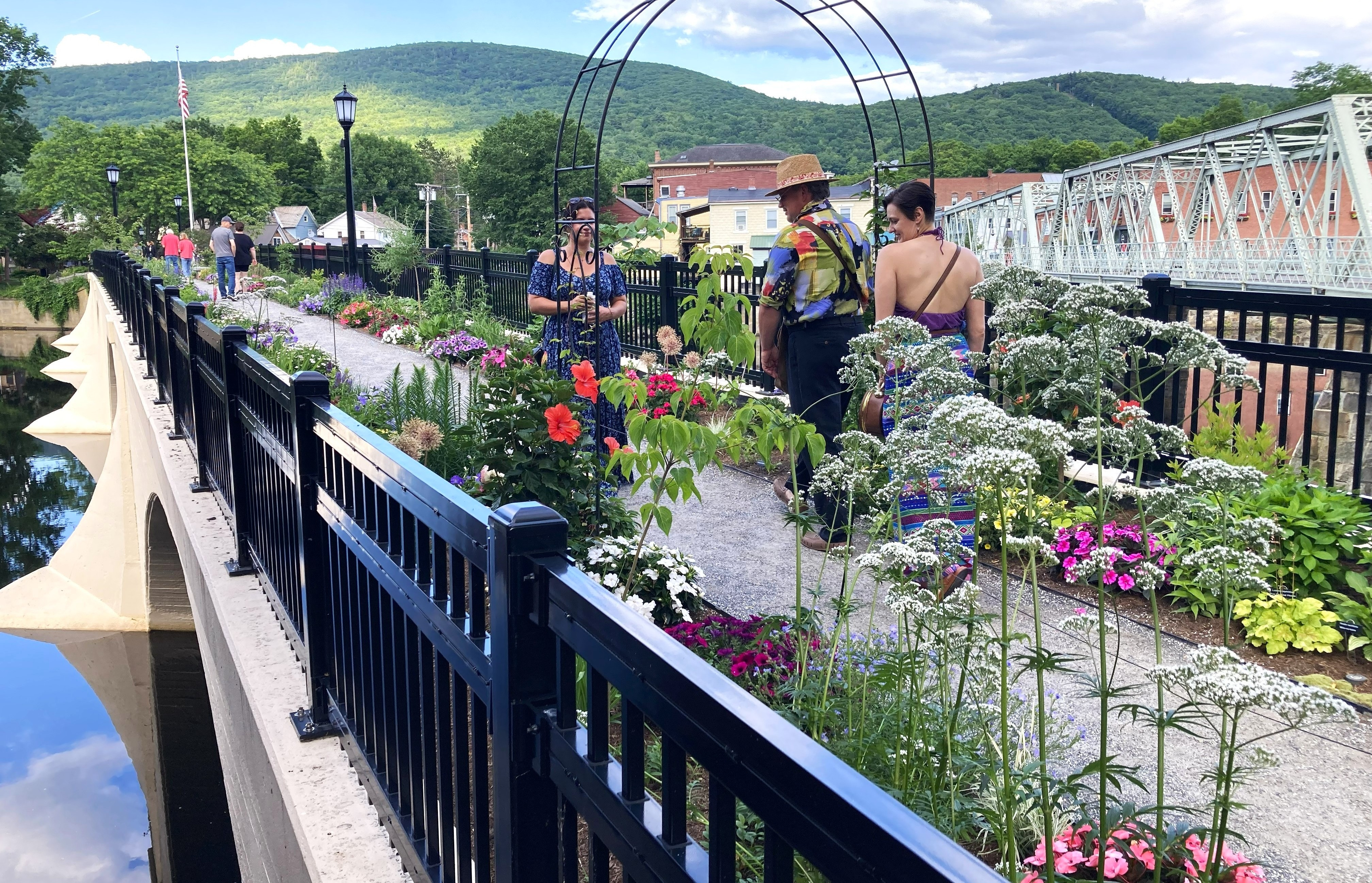
- Bridge of Flowers, Shelburne Falls, Massachusetts (June 2026)
- Coordinates: 42°36′14.67″N 72°44′25.82″W
- Carries: pedestrians
- Crosses: Deerfield River
- Locale: Shelburne Falls, Massachusetts
- Maintained by: Shelburne Falls Area Women's Club

Characteristics
- Design: Arch bridge
- Total length: 400 ft (121 m)
- Width: 18 ft (5 m)

History
- Designer: Edward S. Shaw
- Opened: 1908
- Rebuilt: 1929, 1983

Location
- Interactive map of Bridge of Flowers

The Bridge of Flowers is in Shelburne Falls, Massachusetts, connecting the towns of Shelburne and Buckland. The seasonal footbridge – once a trolley bridge – has a garden of flowers covering it.

== As a trolley bridge ==
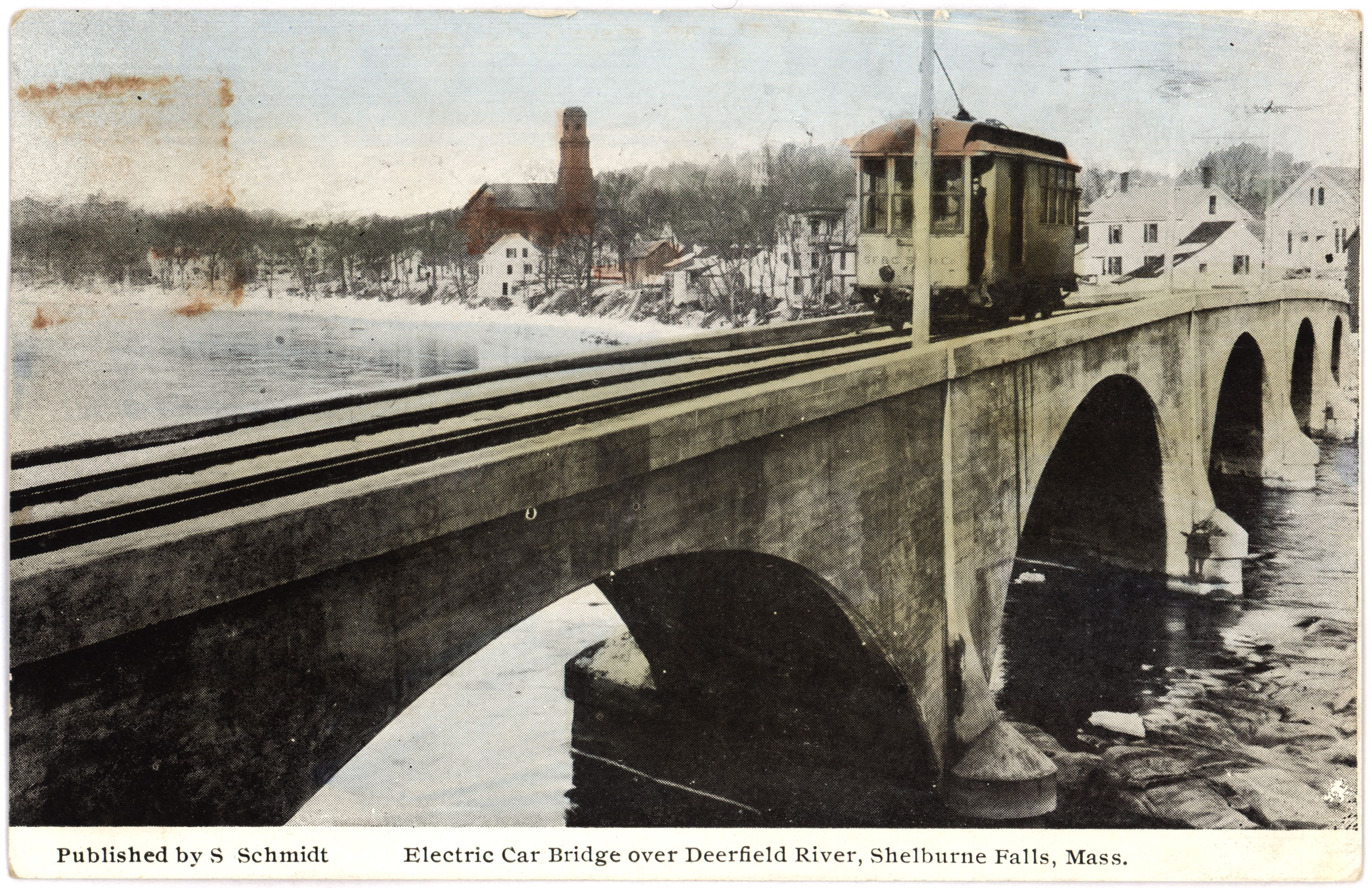
Postcard view of a streetcar on the bridge

Built for $20,000 in 1908 by the Shelburne Falls and Colrain Street Railway, so that freight could be picked up and dropped off directly from the railroads and brought to Colrain. This concrete bridge was necessary because the nearby Iron Bridge had a twenty-ton weight limit. The Iron Bridge – a truss bridge built in 1890 – is still open to vehicles. The two bridges' ends in Buckland are adjacent.

As automobile usage began to increase, freight began to be transported more by trucks, and the street railway (trolley) company went bankrupt in 1927. The history of the railway is preserved in the Shelburne Falls Trolley Museum.

== As a garden ==
In 1929, with the bridge covered in weeds, local housewife Antoinette Burnham came up with the idea of transforming the bridge into a garden. Since it was not needed as a footbridge and could not be demolished because it carried a water main between the two towns, the community agreed to her idea. The Shelburne Woman's Club sponsored the project in 1928. In 1929, eighty loads of loam and several loads of fertilizer were brought to the bridge. Several women's clubs around town raised $1,000 in 1929.

In 1975, a photographic study was conducted of Shelburne Falls. One of the concerns of the town was the deterioration of the bridge structure. In 1981, funds were raised, and a study was commissioned which determined that $580,000 in repairs should be made to the bridge. Various organizations raised money, and repairs began on May 2, 1983. During the restoration, every plant that was removed was cared for in private. The restoration replaced the 8 inches (20 cm) water line, which carries up to half a million gallons of water a day. The bridge contains two and a half feet of soil at the top of the arches and nine feet deep at the piers.

On August 28, 2011, rain runoff from Hurricane Irene (at that point a tropical storm) flooded the Deerfield River and engulfed the Bridge of Flowers. The bridge was closed for repairs in 2024, and reopened in 2025.

The Bridge of Flowers
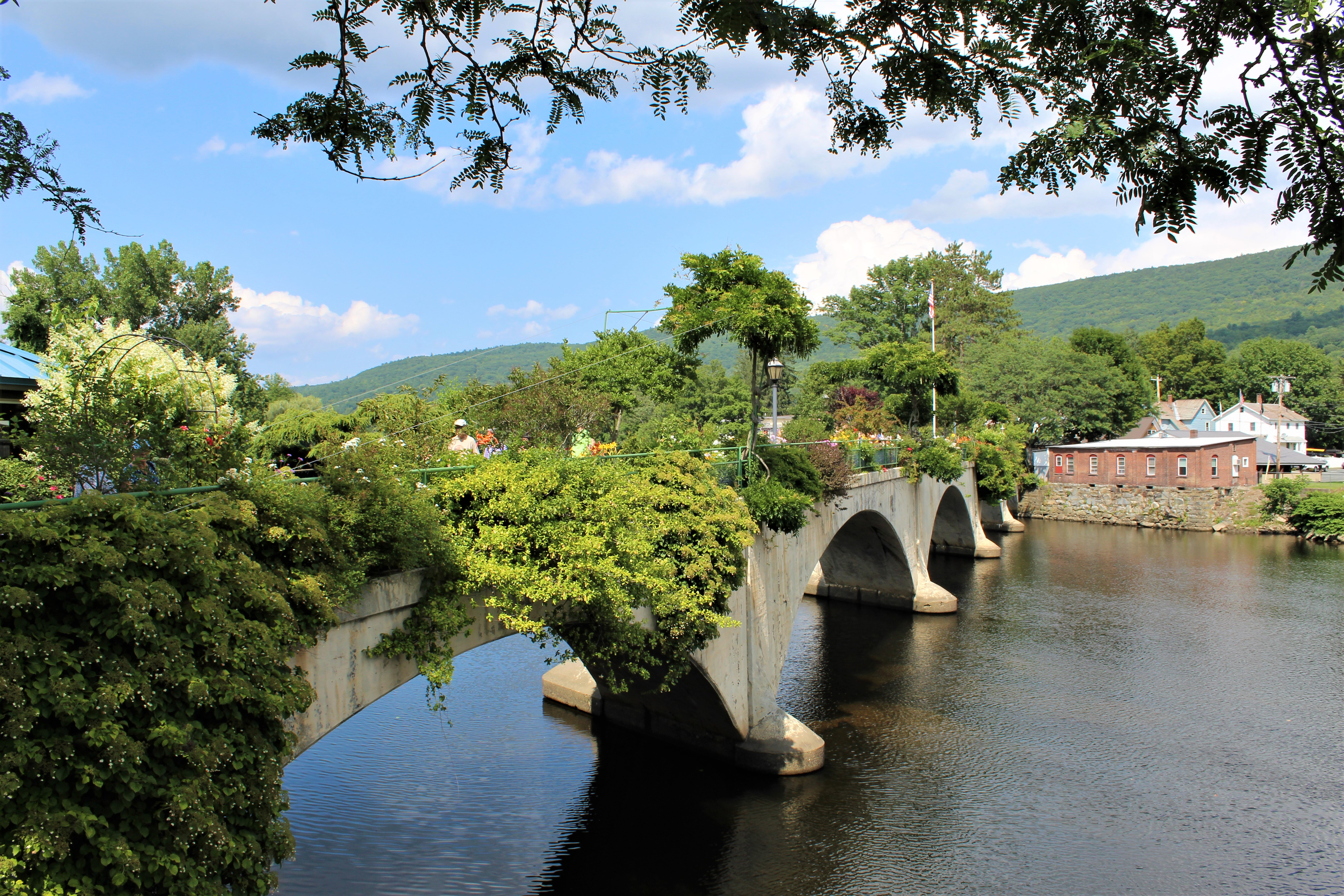
Bridge as it looked in August 2019

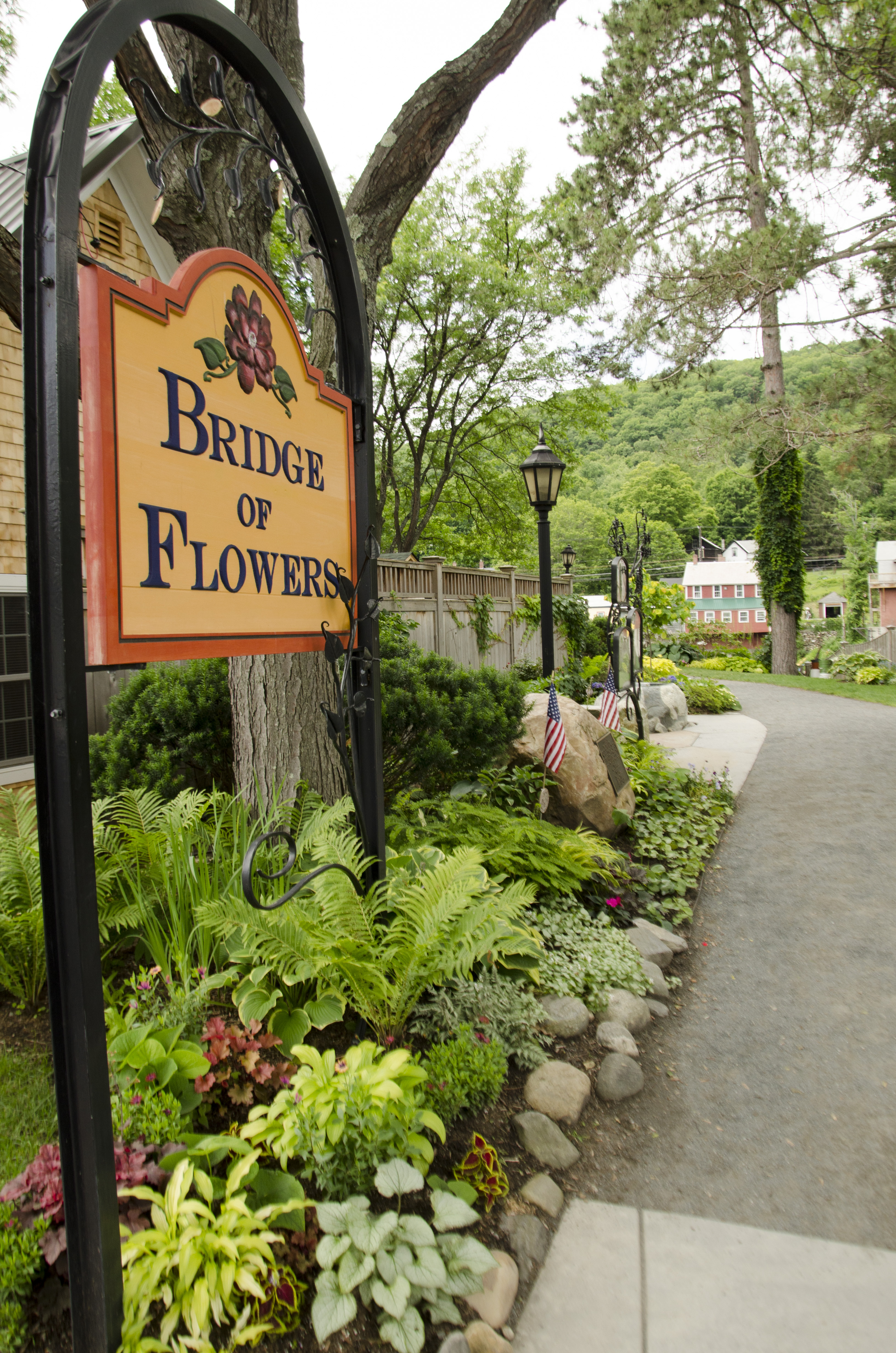
The entrance on the Shelburne Falls side of the bridge

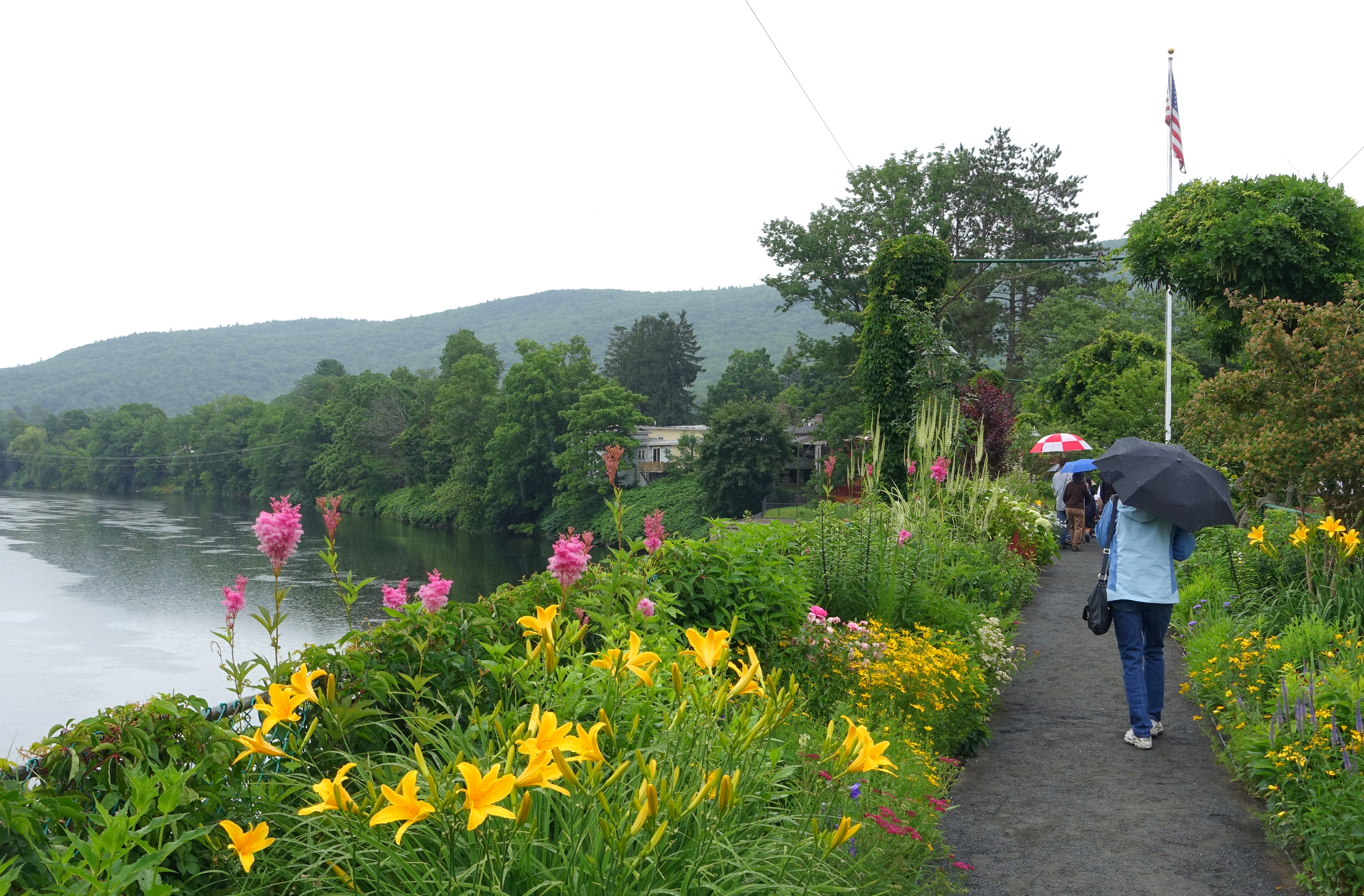
A view from the center of the bridge, with the Deerfield River

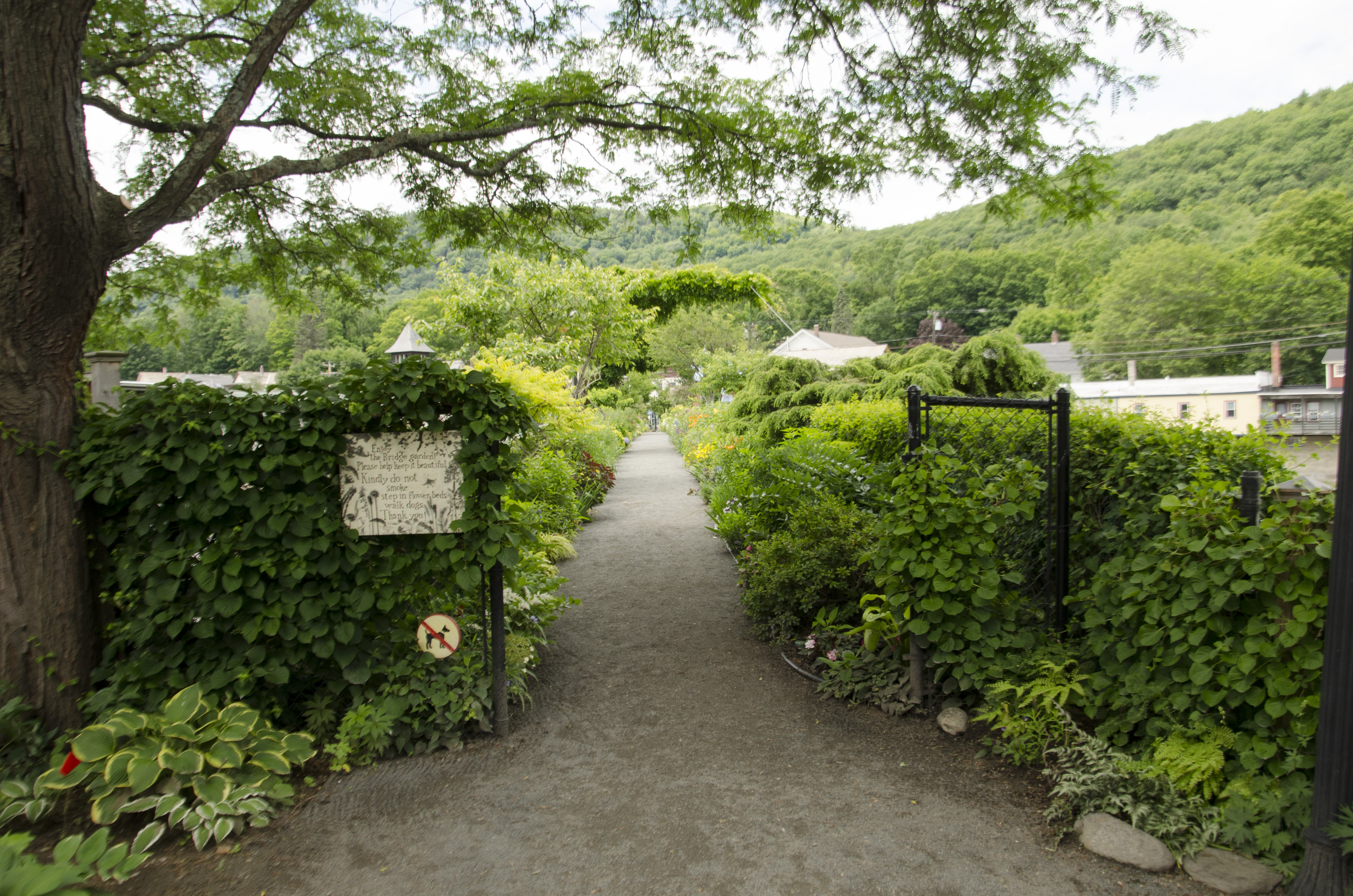
The entrance on the Buckland side of the bridge
