= Highlands, Holyoke, Massachusetts =

Highlands
- Neighborhood of Holyoke
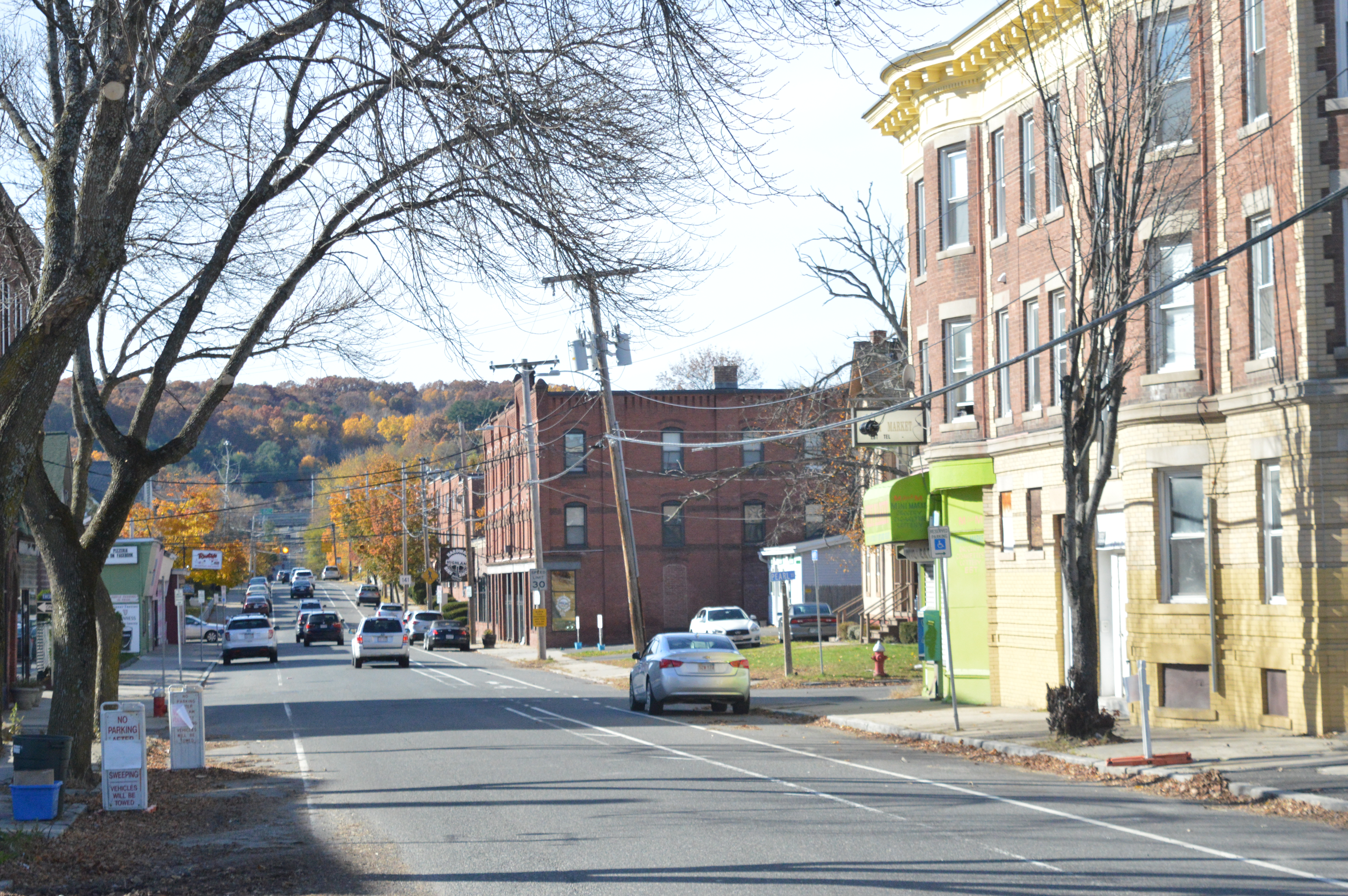
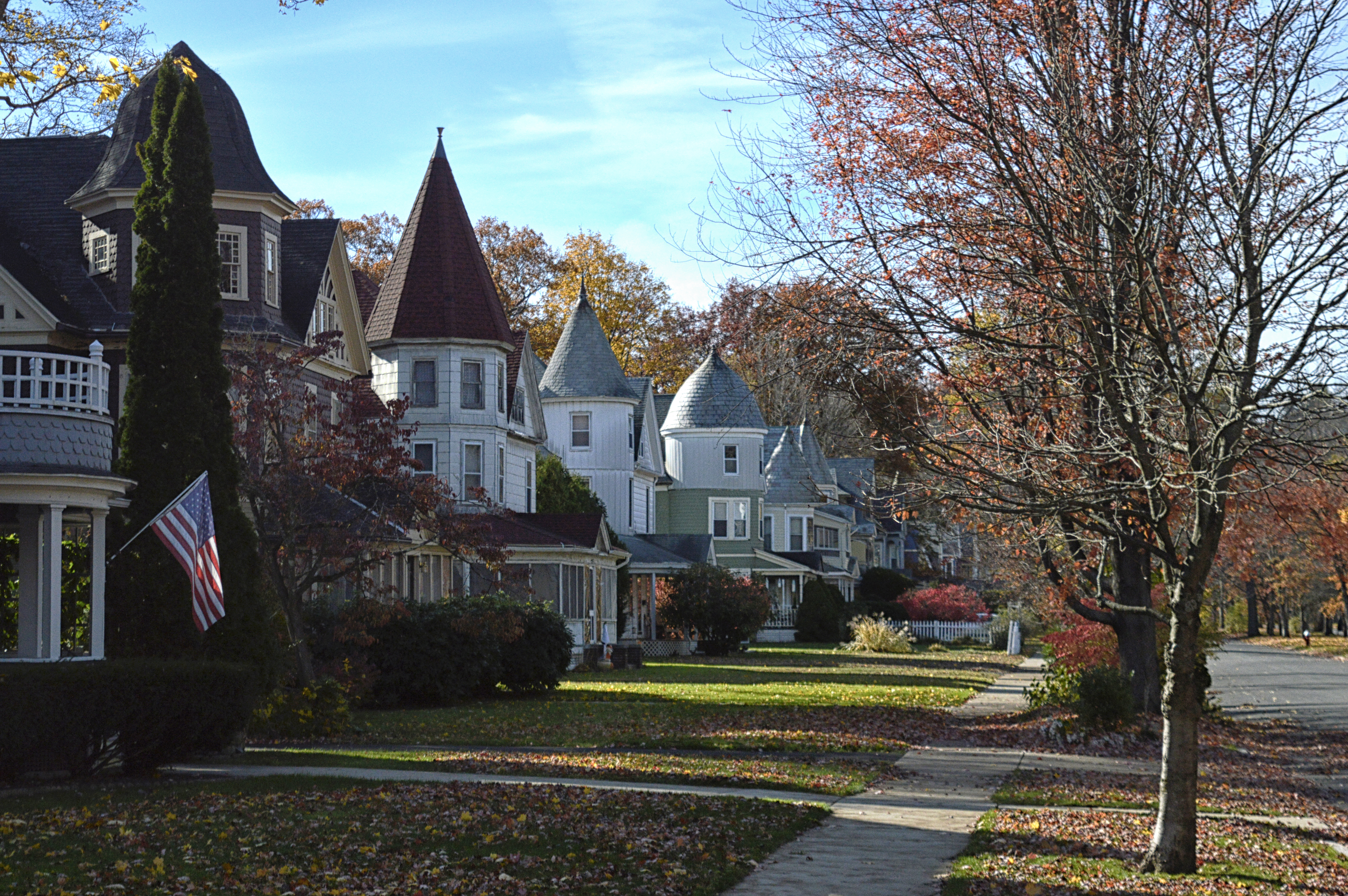
- Top to bottom: Commercial blocks on Hampden Street; examples of Victorian homes found in the Highlands

- Location within Holyoke Location within Massachusetts Location within the United States
- Coordinates: 42°13′10″N 72°37′28″W
- Country: United States
- State: Massachusetts
- City: Holyoke
- Wards: 4, 6, 7
- Precincts: 4B, 6B, 7A, 7B

Area
  - Total: 0.63 sq mi (1.6 km^{2})
- Elevation: 236 ft (72 m)
- ZIP code: 01040
- Area code: 413
- GNIS feature ID: 609000
- MACRIS ID: HLY.A

The Highlands is a neighborhood in Holyoke, Massachusetts located northwest of the city center, adjacent to the downtown. Originally a series of farms and estates, it was first known as Manchester Grounds, as the area's land was reportedly purchased by a company of landowners from Manchester, New Hampshire soon after Holyoke was first chartered, in 1852. However while this name persisted for much of the 19th century, these holders would default on their estates by 1856. The area was further divided into new building lots in the 1870s and saw considerable development as a streetcar suburb when the Holyoke Street Railway completed an extension to the area in 1886. Another early name for the section between Lincoln and Hampden streets was Money Hole Hill, a name also used by Mary Doyle Curran in her portrayal of the neighborhood in her novel The Parish and the Hill. By 1897 the neighborhood had been christened its present name for its higher elevation at the foot of the Mount Tom Range. Today the neighborhood contains many historic Victorian houses and about 400 acres (160 ha) of predominantly residential zoning with some commercial development, as well as the Kennedy and Morgan Street Parks.
