= Wason-Springfield Steam Power Blocks =

Historic buildings in Springfield, Massachusetts, US

- U.S. National Register of Historic Places
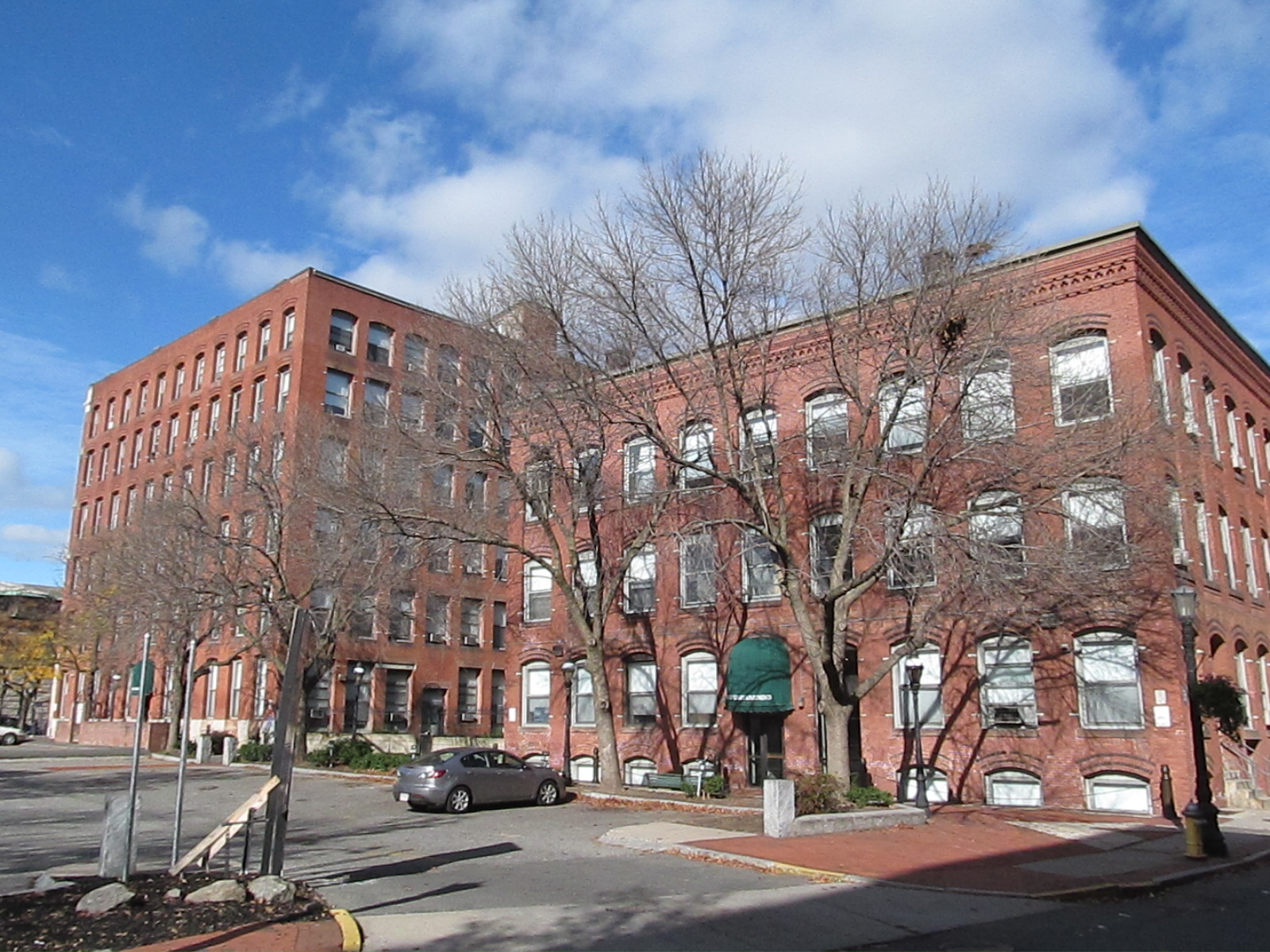
- Wason-Springfield Steam Power Blocks

- Location within Massachusetts Location within the United States
- Location: 27-43 Lyman St.; 26-50 Taylor St., Springfield, Massachusetts
- Coordinates: 42°6′17″N 72°35′37″W
- Area: 1.2 acres (0.49 ha)
- Built: 1873
- Architect: Perkins & Gardner
- NRHP reference No.: 79000349
- Added to NRHP: June 19, 1979

The Wason-Springfield Steam Power Blocks are a collection of three historic commercial blocks at 27-43 Lyman St. and 26-50 Taylor Street in downtown Springfield, Massachusetts. They were built in the 1870s by the J.W. Wason Car Company and the Springfield Steam Power Company as facilities to support the development of new businesses in what was then called the North Blocks area of the city.

Development on the north side of downtown Springfield was spurred by its proximity to the railroad lines that made the city an important regional transportation hub. In the 1850s, the Lyman and Taylor Streets, the two streets nearest the station, developed with small wood-frame and brick commercial and industrial buildings. A portion of this area became the plant of the Wason Manufacturing Company, maker of railroad cars. It moved to a new outlying factory in 1872, leasing its old factory to smaller businesses. The Powers Block, a six-story brick building at 27-37 Lyman Street, was built in 1873 by the Wason Company on part of its old factory grounds. It has five stories, and provided warehouse and factory space to the Powers Paper Company. An addition in 1881 increased its size by more than half, and a sixth floor was added in 1910. The Bryan Company Block, 39-43 Lyman Street, was built in 1889 for the Clark W. Bryan Company, and is a four-story brick construction. The Steam Power Company's Taylor Street Block, 26-50 Taylor Street, is a three-story brick block built in 1875. Originally longer, the building was shortened by 75 feet (23 m) to make way for the post office building on Dwight Street.

The buildings have been converted to residential use. They were listed on the National Register of Historic Places in 1979.

== See also ==
- Springfield Steam Power Company Block, 51-59 Taylor Street
- National Register of Historic Places listings in Springfield, Massachusetts
- National Register of Historic Places listings in Hampden County, Massachusetts
