= Springfield Steam Power Company Block =

- U.S. National Register of Historic Places
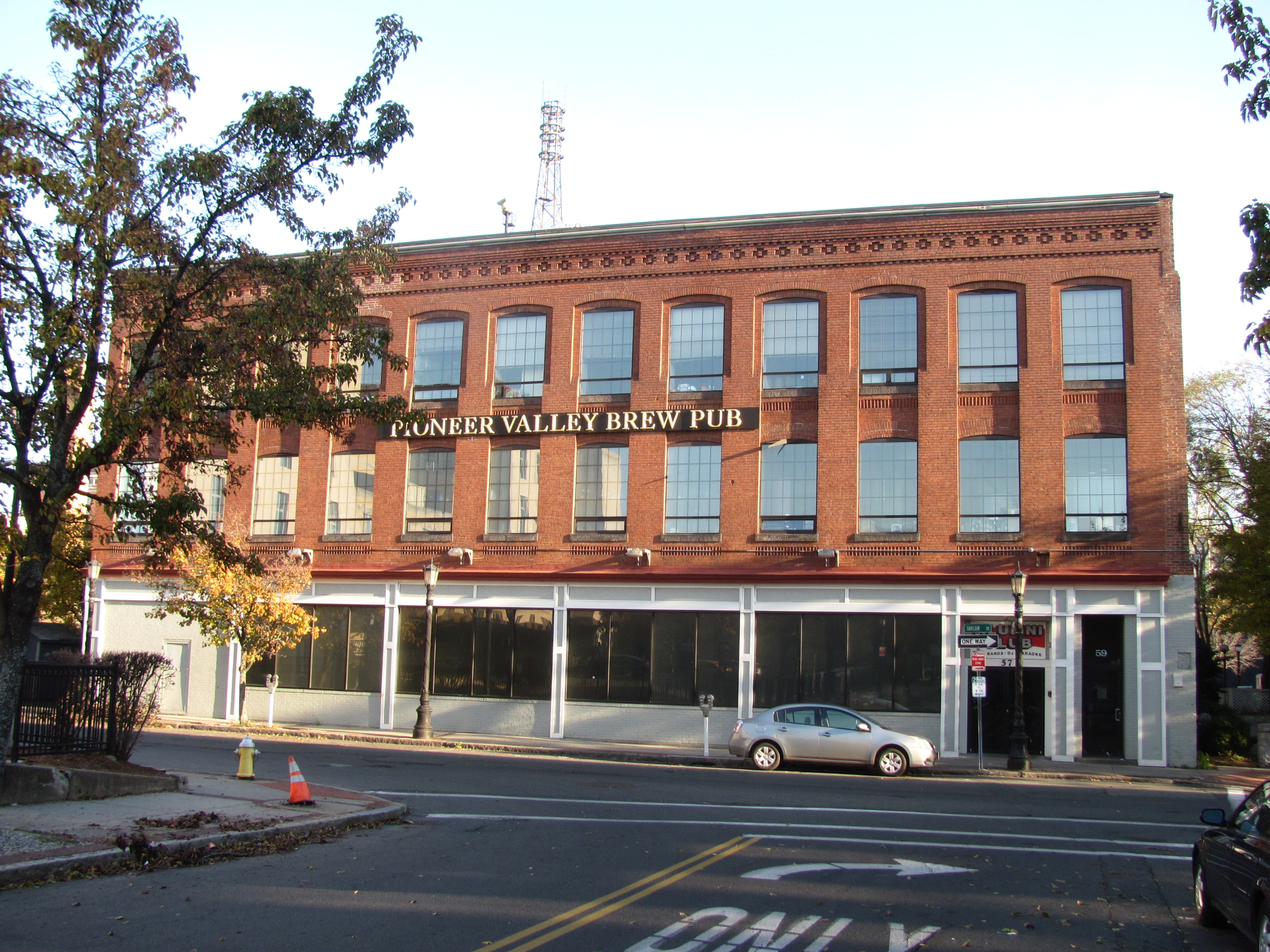
- Springfield Steam Power Company Block

- Location within Massachusetts Location within the United States
- Location: 51-59 Taylor St., Springfield, Massachusetts
- Coordinates: 42°6′18″N 72°35′33″W
- Area: less than one acre
- Built: 1881
- MPS: Downtown Springfield MRA
- NRHP reference No.: 83000767
- Added to NRHP: February 24, 1983

The Springfield Steam Power Company Block is a historic industrial building at 51-59 Taylor Street in downtown Springfield, Massachusetts. Built in 1881, it is a surviving example of a late 19th-century power distribution component, part of a scheme by the Springfield Steam Power Company to deliver steam power to nearby industrial facilities. The block was listed on the National Register of Historic Places in 1983. Its ground floor now houses "The City Church", a local community of Jesus followers.

== Description and history ==
The Springfield Steam Power Company Block is located on the south side of Taylor street in downtown Springfield, opposite its junction with Kaynor Street. It is a utilitarian three-story brick building with a flat roof. Its upper-floor bays consist of recessed segmented-arch sections two stories in height, with windows on each level separate by a brick panel. There is some decorative brick corbelling in the eave below the main roof. The ground floor is divided into five bays separated by pilasters, with a retail entrance to their right, and an upper-story building entrance at the far right.

The block was built in 1881 for the Springfield Steam Power Company, which was established by the directors of the Wason Car Manufacturing Company to provide steam power to factory buildings the company offered to build nearby. The business plan was made possible by what was the largest real estate transaction in the city's history to that time, in which entire city blocks changed ownership. This particular building was built by the company for lease to smaller industrial concerns; early tenants included a brass foundry, iron works, and a sewing machine company.

== See also ==
- Wason-Springfield Steam Power Blocks
- National Register of Historic Places listings in Springfield, Massachusetts
- National Register of Historic Places listings in Hampden County, Massachusetts
