= Wason Manufacturing Company =

Former American rolling stock manufacturer

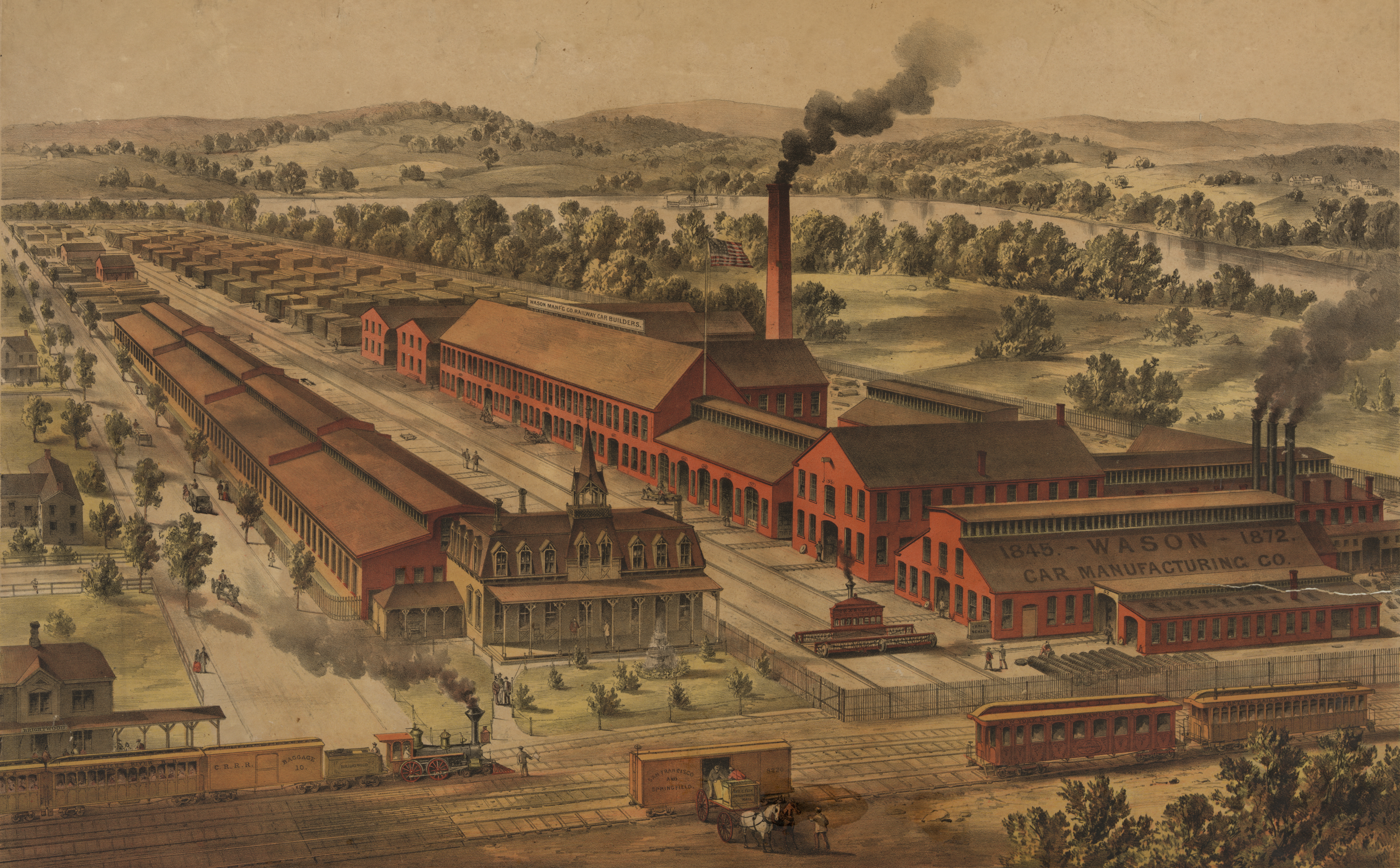
- An 1876 engraving of the company's works in Springfield
- Type: Subsidiary (after 1906)
- Founded: 1845
- Founders: Thomas W. Wason; Charles Wason
- Defunct: 1932
- Fate: Purchased by J. G. Brill and Company in 1906, dissolved in 1932
- Headquarters: Springfield, Massachusetts, United States
- Key people: H. S. Hyde; George C. Fisk
- Products: Trams, railcars
- Owner: J. G. Brill Company

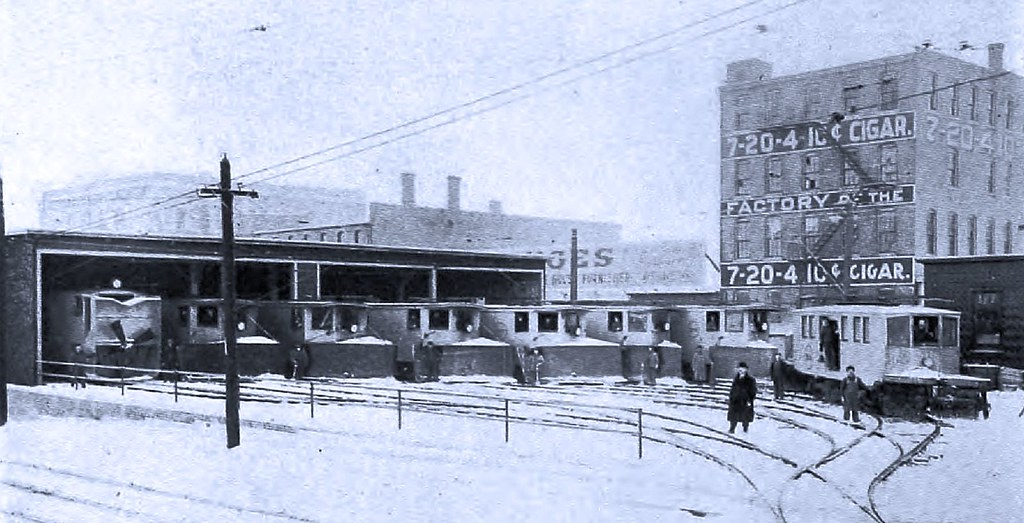
Wason plows from the Wason Manufacturing Company in Manchester, NH. (1909) Note the sign advertising Cuban cigars.

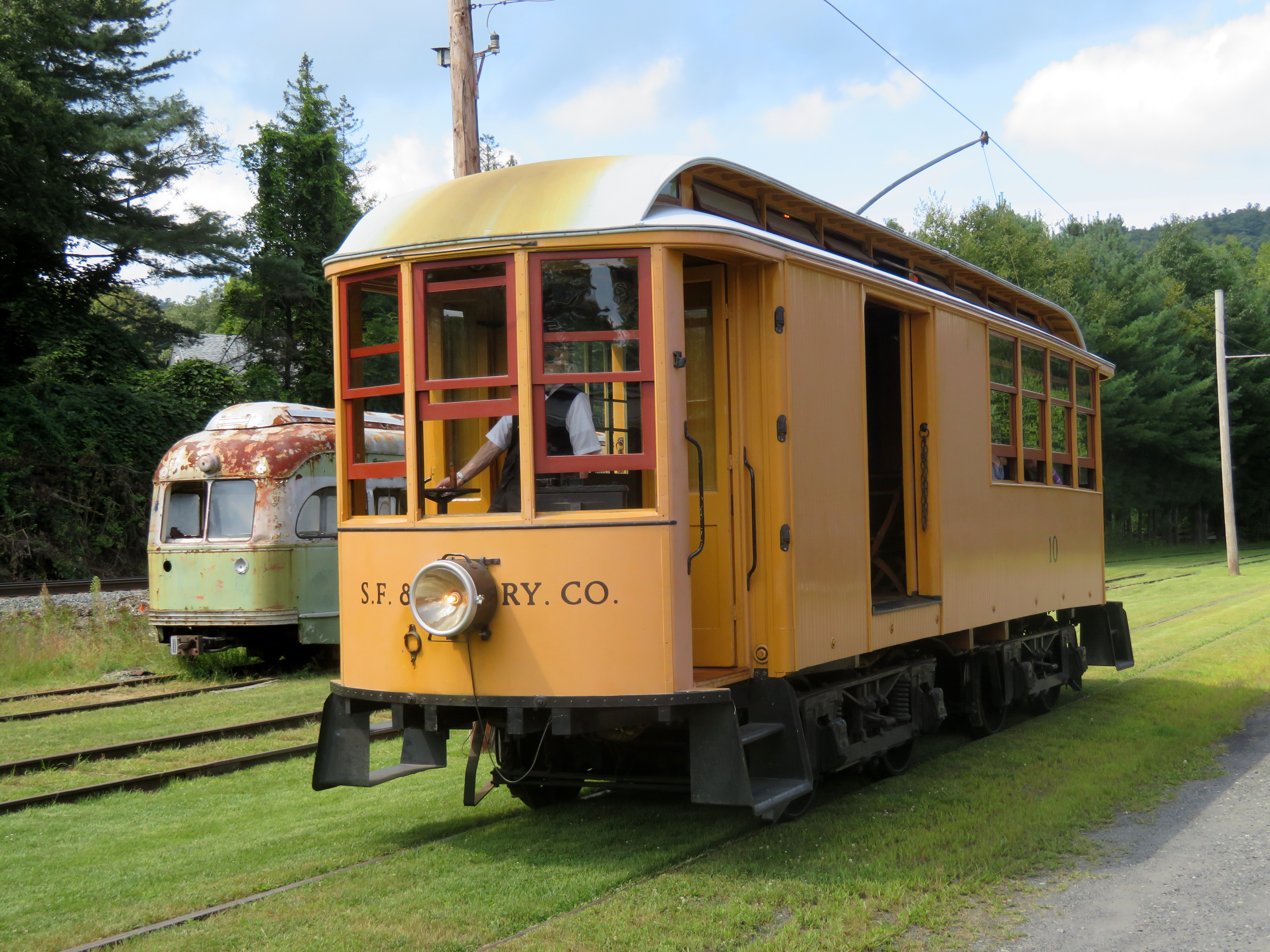
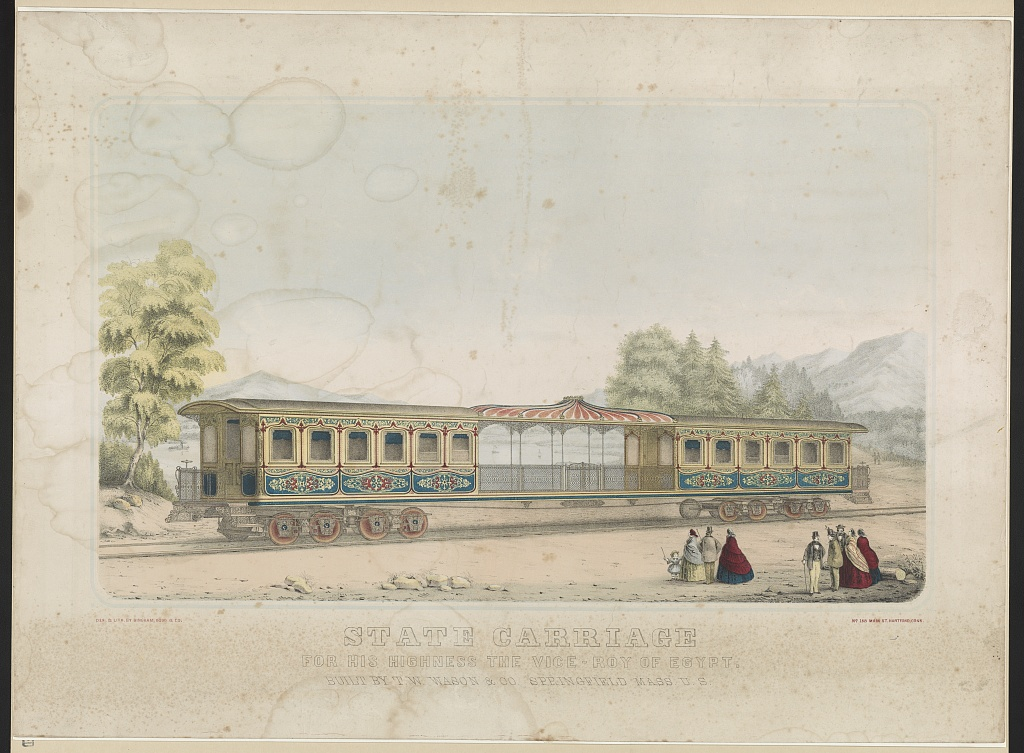
A surviving example of a Wason tram, at the Shelburne Falls Trolley Museum; the ornate state carriage built for Sa'id of Egypt in 1860

The Wason Manufacturing Company was a maker of Trolleys & Passenger railroad cars during the Progressive Era until the Great Depression. The company was founded in 1845 in Springfield, Massachusetts by Charles Wason (1816-1888) and Thomas Wason (1811-1870). Although the concept would later be popularized by the Pullman Company, Wason was the first to manufacture sleeping cars in America.

Wason's earliest clients included the Michigan Southern Railroad (1846–1855), Alton Railroad, Central Railroad of New Jersey, and Boston and Maine Railroad, as well as foreign operators such as the State Railway of Chile, and Egyptian National Railways, providing the latter with 161 cars as well as an ornate state carriage for Sa'id of Egypt, the viceroy at that time. By 1867 the company had about 300 employees. The company made the first passenger coaches used on the Transcontinental railroad. One of these became the personal rail car of Leland Stanford, President of the Central Pacific Railroad. By 1868 the company had consolidated with the Springfield Machine Company, keeping the name Wason Manufacturing.

Around 1900 Wason concentrated on manufacturing streetcars and electrified railway cars. Clients included the Holyoke Street Railway Company and Manhattan Railway Company. The company became a subsidiary of J. G. Brill and Company in 1906. It continued to manufacture both streetcars and conventional railroad cars until 1932, when the Great Depression forced Brill to close the plant.

One of the only surviving examples of a Wason coach can be found at the California State Railroad Museum's Railtown facility in Jamestown, California, located in the Sierra foothills. Wason streetcars on display at museums include 13 streetcars, interurban cars, and rapid transit cars at the Seashore Trolley Museum in Kennebunkport, ME; an 1896 model at the Shelburne Falls Trolley Museum (Mass.) and a 1901 model at the Connecticut Trolley Museum.

Wason was a prominent manufacturer of trolley plows and street cleaning equipment. Philadelphia and Western #10, built by Wason in 1915, was the last street railway plow to operate in the United States. It is preserved at the Rock Hill Trolley Museum in Pennsylvania.

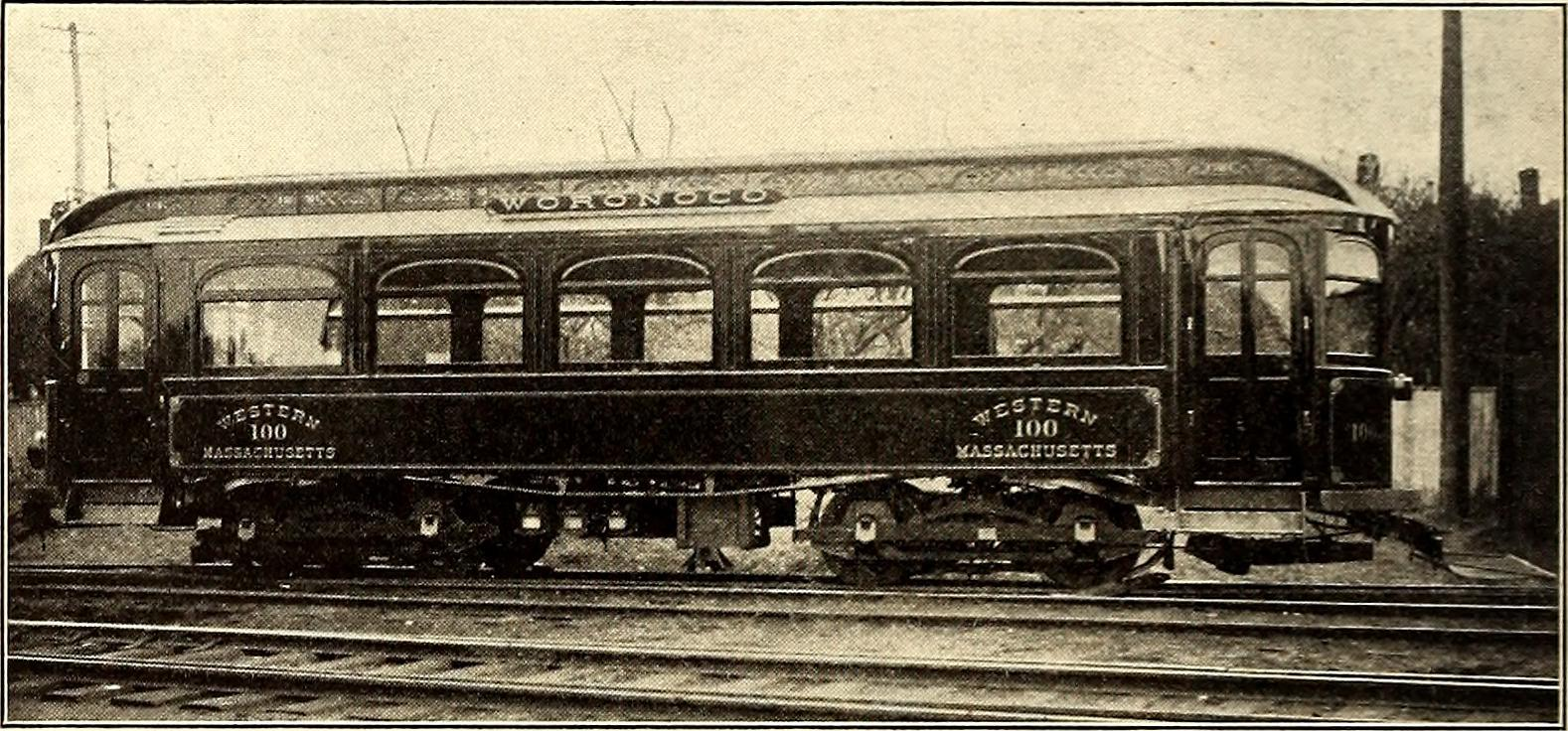
Woronoco #100 c.1880s

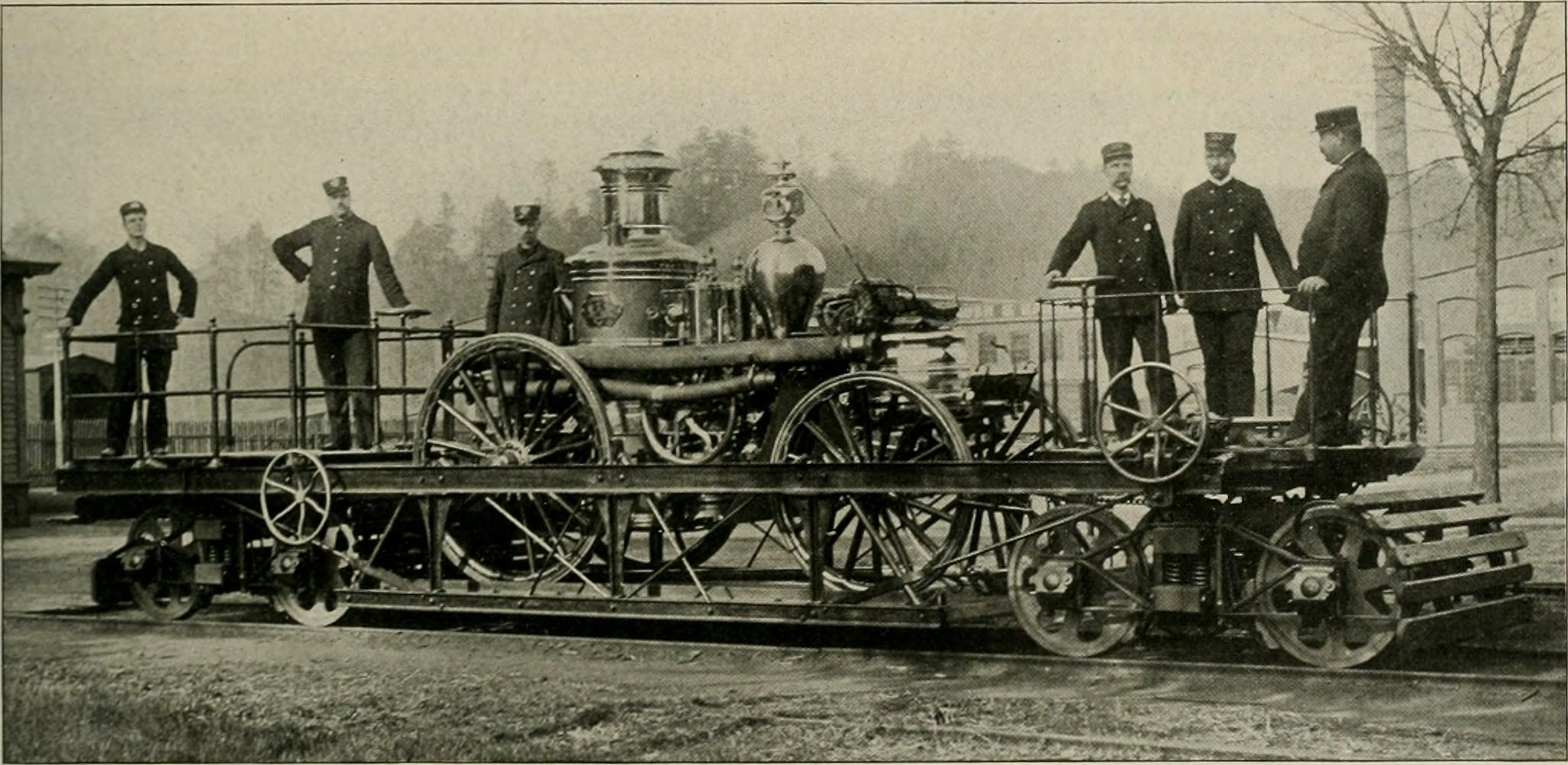
Wason built fire engine as street car for Springfield Fire Department

== See also ==
- List of rolling stock manufacturers
- Wason-Springfield Steam Power Blocks, historic site
- NERHS Blueprints Collection at DigitalMaine, archive containing high-quality scans of Wason-made railcar blueprints digitized by the Seashore Trolley Museum.
- See also; NERHS Trolley Images Collection at DigitalMaine, the largest online archive of Wason railcar order photographs containing over 1,500 images of Wason trams and other railcars digitized in ultra high quality by the Trolley Museum from original negatives.
