= Shelburne Falls Trolley Museum =

Transport museum in Massachusetts, United States

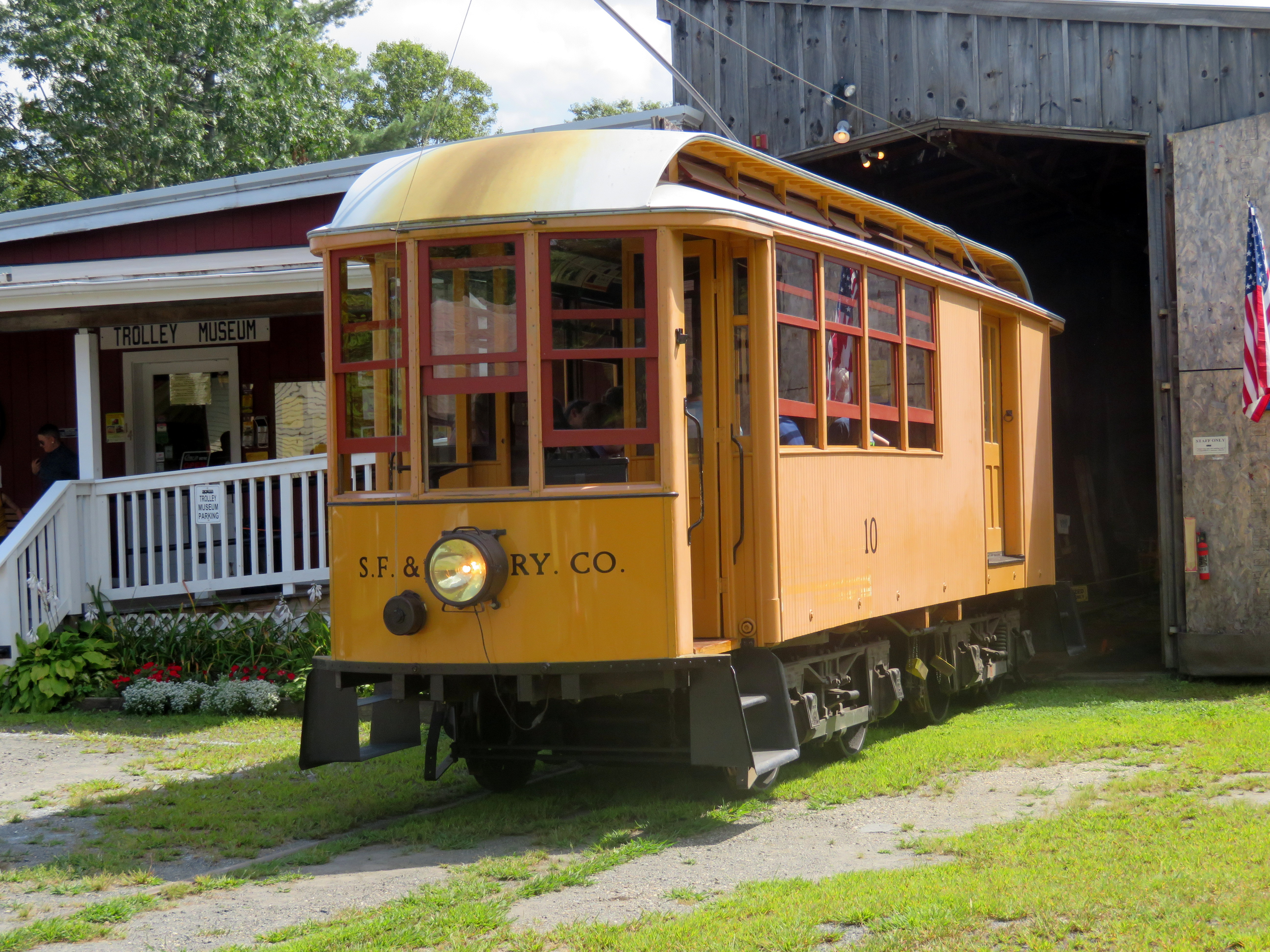
- SFC #10 at the museum in 2018
- Location: Shelburne Falls, Massachusetts, United States.
- Coordinates: 42.599517°N 72.738836°W
- Website: www.sftm.org

The Shelburne Falls Trolley Museum is a small railroad museum in Shelburne Falls, Massachusetts, United States.

The museum (SFTM) is dedicated to preserving and operating car number 10 of the former Shelburne Falls and Colrain Street Railway. This is a combination passenger-baggage trolley car built by the Wason Manufacturing Company of Springfield, Massachusetts, in 1896 and is the last known trolley car from the Shelburne Falls & Colrain Street Railway.

In 1992, Marshall Johnson donated car number 10 (which his father had bought and saved when the Shelburne Falls & Colrain Street Railway shut down, decades earlier) to a small group of people who restored the car back to working order.

The museum also has a small assortment of equipment that is not related to the Shelburne Falls & Colrain Street Railway, including an ex-Central Vermont caboose, a Central Vermont handcar, two MBTA PCC cars, and other railroad and trolley equipment.

The Shelburne Falls Trolley Museum is located in the old Buckland Freight yard.
