= Daughters of Mary of the Immaculate Conception =

Roman Catholic congregation for women

The Daughters of Mary of the Immaculate Conception (DM) is a pontifical apostolic institute of women religious founded in 1904 by Lucyan Bojnowski.

== History ==
Born in Poland, Bojnowski was pastor of Sacred Heart Parish (New Britain, Connecticut), one of the oldest Polish-American Roman Catholic parishes in New England. He saw the need to provide basic social services to the growing Polish immigrant families in New Britain.

In 1904, Bojnowski made an appeal for members of the parish to help care for orphans, and eight women of the Children of Mary Society responded. An orphanage was started in a rented building on Orange Street. In the 1920s, Our Lady of Rose Hill Orphanage was built on top of a hill overlooking forty acres of farmland Bojnowski had purchased north of Broad Street. The farm that included crops, cows, pigs, chickens and Bojnowski's beehives. There was an annual bus trip to Lake CompounceAmusement Park every summer. In 1970 the orphanage was converted to a day-care center.

== Present day ==
In recent years, in conjunction with Eversource Energy and Ecosolar, solar panels were installed in three fields. St. Lucian's Home for the Aged went online in 2017, resulting in a savings in operating costs.
