= Burbach Block =

- U.S. National Register of Historic Places
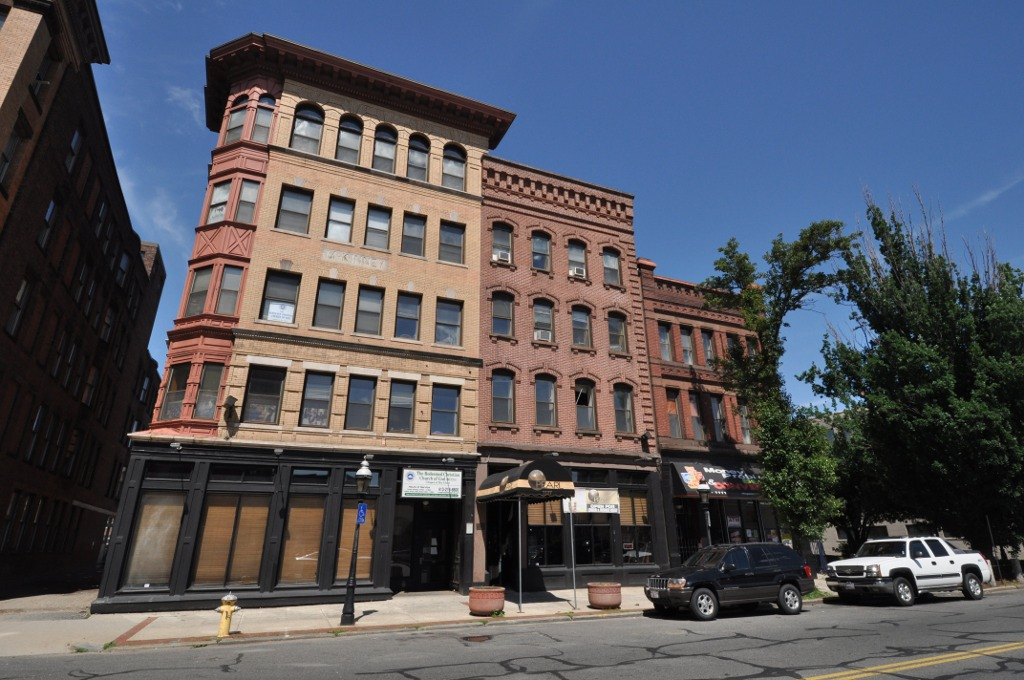
- The Burbach Block is on the right of these three buildings; the Bangs Block is in the center, and the McKinney Building is on the left.

- Location within Massachusetts Location within the United States
- Location: 1113–1115 Main St., Springfield, Massachusetts
- Coordinates: 42°6′0″N 72°35′9″W
- Area: less than one acre
- Built: 1882
- MPS: Downtown Springfield MRA
- NRHP reference No.: 83000739
- Added to NRHP: February 24, 1983

The Burbach Block is a historic commercial and retail block at 1113–1115 Main Street in Springfield, Massachusetts. Built in 1882, it is one of a series of buildings marking the area's transition from a smaller-scale residential service area to the commercial downtown. The building was listed on the National Register of Historic Places in 1983.

== Description and history ==
The Burbach Block is located near the southern end of the built-up commercial downtown area of Springfield. It is on the north side of Main Street, at the southern end of a row of three commercial buildings: the Bangs Block and McKinney Building also occupy the block demarcated by Crossett Lane and Cross Street. The Burbach Block is three stories in height, built of red brick, and is separated from Cross Street by a narrow park. It is five bays wide, with a single modern commercial storefront on the ground floor. Stone beltcourses substitute for window sills and lintels on the upper levels, and patterned brickwork is found above each of those levels. Its facade is topped by a brickwork parapet with corbelled square posts at the corners.

The building was built in 1882 for Gerard Burbach, proprietor of an adjacent hotel, which was demolished in 1915 as part of a project to widen Cross Street. It may have acted as an annex for the hotel in its early years; the hotel, founded in the 1850s, was at its height in the 1890s. In the 20th century, this building has seen a number of uses including furniture store, dry goods dealer, and restaurant.

== See also ==
- Bangs Block, 1119 Main Street
- McKinney Building, 1121–1127 Main Street
- National Register of Historic Places listings in Springfield, Massachusetts
- National Register of Historic Places listings in Hampden County, Massachusetts
