= St. Michael the Archangel's Parish (Bridgeport, Connecticut) =

Coordinates: 41°30′10.5″N 73°02′39.8″W

St. Michael the Archangel Parish
- St. Michael the Archangel Parish
- Location: 310 Pulaski Street; Bridgeport, Connecticut
- Country: United States
- Denomination: Roman Catholic
- Website: Parish website

History
- Founded: 1899
- Founder: Polish immigrants
- Dedication: St. Michael the Archangel

Administration
- Province: Hartford
- Diocese: Bridgeport
- Parish: Conventual Franciscans

Clergy
- Bishop: Most Rev. Frank Caggiano
- Vicar: Fr. Stefan Morawski OFM Conv.
- Pastor: Fr. Norbert M. Siwinski OFM Conv.

St. Michael the Archangel Parish - designated for Polish immigrants in Bridgeport, Connecticut, United States.

Founded in 1899. It is one of the Polish-American Roman Catholic parishes in New England in the Diocese of Bridgeport.

== History ==
In 1899 Bishop of Hartford Michael Tierney, assigned Rev. Joseph Sulkowski to the newly formed Polish parish, consisting of approximately 1,000 Polish immigrants in Bridgeport's multi-ethnic East Side. The parish was organized in December 1899 and soon after an old Roman Catholic church on Crescent Avenue was purchased. What was once known as St. Mary's became the new St. Michael's. In 1890, Bishop Tierney transferred Father Sulkowski and assigned Rev. Witold Becker as pastor. Parishioners were disturbed about the transfer of their well-liked Polish priest and some reportedly left the church when Father Becker assumed his pastoral duties. Over time, Father Becker managed to establish a Sunday school and church societies, and brought back some who had left the parish.

Father Becker died in 1906 and the parish was placed under the Conventual Franciscans of the Polish-American Province of St. Anthony and the Franciscans became responsible for finding new priests appropriate for the Polish American parish. Rev. Leon Wierzynski ministered to the parish from August to December 1906, when Rev. Felix Baran arrived to take over the parish. The parish members upset at once again losing a well-liked Polish priest demonstrated and even physically blocked the transfer. Police were called in to disperse the protesters and the church was locked to keep them out. Some of the dissatisfied parishioners left St. Michael's permanently, forming St. Joseph's Polish Parish under the Polish National Catholic Church in early 1907.

== Buildings ==
The Church of St. Michael the Archangel
- Interactive map of the The Church of St. Michael the Archangel area

General information
- Location: Bridgeport, Connecticut, United States of America
- Completed: 1907
- Client: Roman Catholic Diocese of Bridgeport

Design and construction
- Architect: George P. B. Alderman of Holyoke, Massachusetts

In 1907, the present St. Michael the Archangel Roman Catholic Church was built on what is now known today as Pulaski Street. The architect for the church was George P. B. Alderman of Holyoke, Massachusetts who also designed Sacred Heart Church, New Britain, CT.

In 1989, the church was closed for a period of time when Bishop Edward M. Egan called on police to evict dissident parishioners who had occupied the church for a week. About 200 parishioners had been protesting the transfer of a popular priest, Rev. Roman Palaszewski, brought from Poland three years earlier.

== See also ==
- Archangel Michael in Christian art
- Catholic Church in the United States
- Catholic parish church
- Index of Catholic Church articles

== Bibliography ==
- The 150th Anniversary of Polish-American Pastoral Ministry. Webster, Massachusetts: St. Joseph Basilica. September 11, 2005.
- Liptak, Dolores (1987). European Immigrants and the Catholic Church of Connecticut, 1870-1920. Center Migration Studies. ISBN 978-0-913256-80-0.
- DiGiovanni, Stephen Michael (1988). The Catholic Church in Fairfield County, 1666-1961. William Mulvey. p. 57. ISBN 978-0-934791-12-0.
- The Official Catholic Directory in USA
- "Bridgeport's Ethnic Background--Late 19th Century". St. Joseph’s Parish.
- CT Bridgeport - St Michael the Archangel- 1899-1974 - PPHC127 (University of Notre Dame, Indiana)
