= Clovis Robert Block =

- U.S. National Register of Historic Places
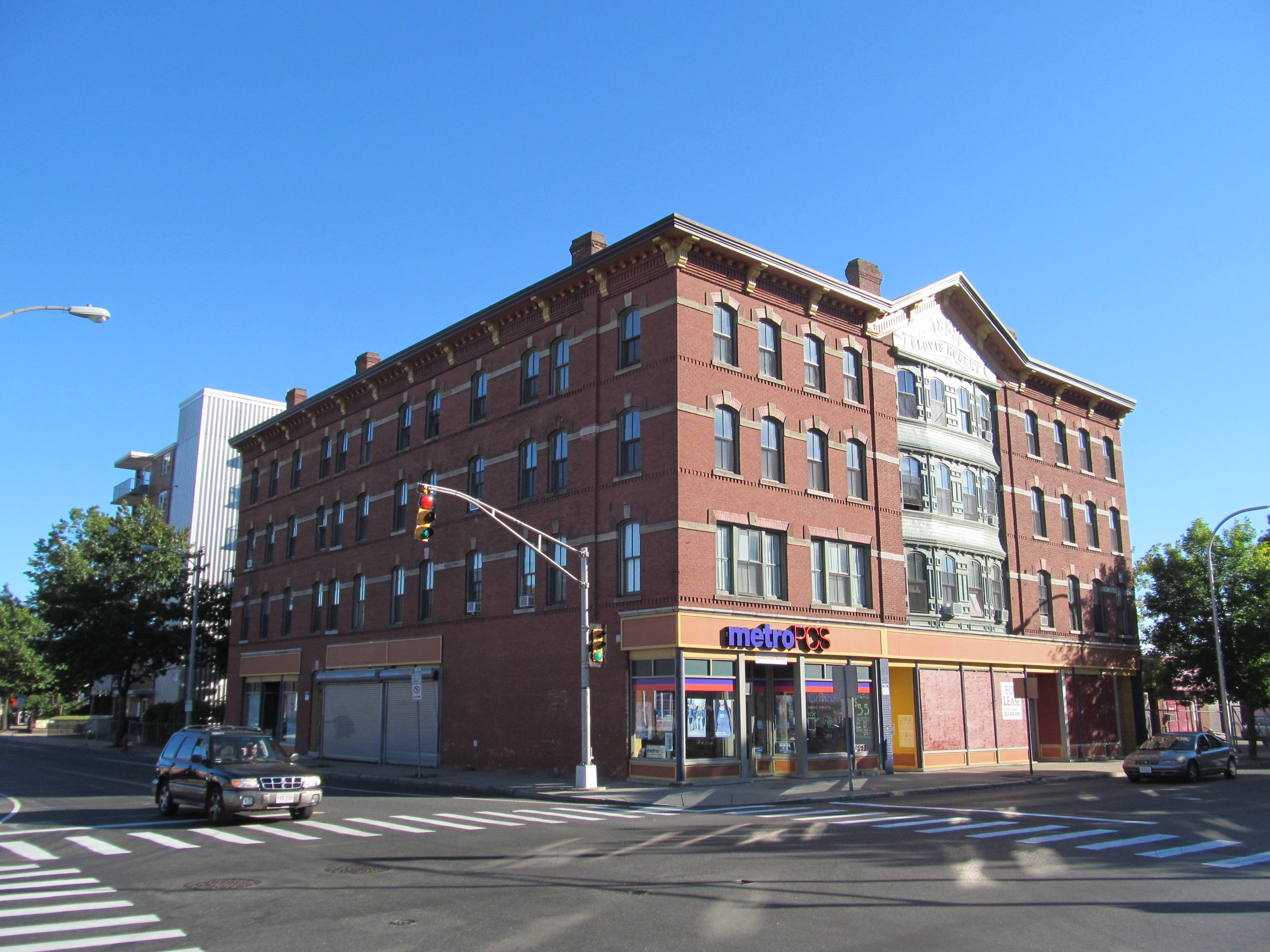
- Clovis Robert Block

- Location within Holyoke Location within Massachusetts Location within the United States
- Location: Holyoke, Massachusetts
- Coordinates: 42°11′59″N 72°36′28″W
- Built: 1881
- Architect: Alderman, George P.B.
- NRHP reference No.: 02001472
- Added to NRHP: December 5, 2002

The Clovis Robert Block is a historic mixed-use commercial and residential block at 338-348 Main Street (the corner of Cabot Street) in south Holyoke, Massachusetts. Built in 1881 and enlarged in 1888, it is a prominent early example of the work of local architect George P. B. Alderman, and is representative of development patterns in the city that served its growing French Canadian immigrant community. The building was listed on the National Register of Historic Places in 2002.

== Description and history ==
The Clovis Robert Block is located in the urban South Holyoke area of the city, at the junction of Main and Cabot Streets. It is four stories in height, its exterior finished in red brick and cast stone. A projecting cornice with brackets and modillion blocks extends across the top of its street-facing facades. The ground floor houses five retail spaces, those facing Main Street, with recessed entrances. Bands of brick corbelling separate the floors, and the Main Street facade has a central bowed copper-clad section four bays wide, with a gable at the top. Most windows outside that section are simple sash, set in segmented-arch openings with keystoned and shouldered lintels. The interior, which originally housed fifteen residential units on the upper floors, has been extensively altered, although interior stairwells retain some of their original finishes.

The building was built in 1881 for Clovis Robert, an expatriate French Canadian, and expanded in 1888, both to an early design of Holyoke architect George P. B. Alderman. It was built during a period of major migration by French Canadians to the area, seeking work in the local mills. Robert was a prominent local developer and real estate agent for the Holyoke and Westfield Railroad, with this described as his best-known development. He sold the building 1907. It has since had a succession of owners, and was in poor condition when listed on the National Register in 2002. It has since been rehabilitated.

== See also ==
- Friedrich Block, another local Alderman design
- National Register of Historic Places listings in Hampden County, Massachusetts
