= Bangs Block =

- U.S. National Register of Historic Places
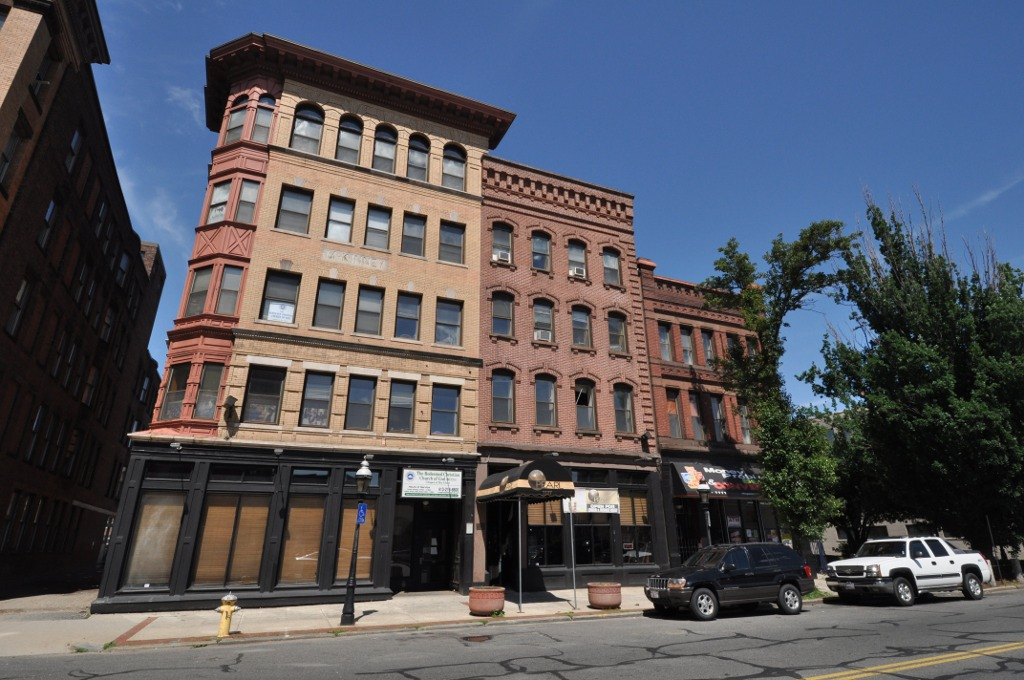
- The Bangs Block is the center of these three buildings; the Burbach Block is to the right, the McKinney Building to the left.

- Location within Massachusetts Location within the United States
- Location: 1119 Main St., Springfield, Massachusetts
- Coordinates: 42°6′0″N 72°35′9″W
- Area: less than one acre
- Built: 1870
- Architectural style: Italianate
- MPS: Downtown Springfield MRA
- NRHP reference No.: 83000736
- Added to NRHP: February 24, 1983

The Bangs Block is a historic commercial building at 1119 Main Street in Springfield, Massachusetts. Built in 1870 for a grocer, it was built as part of a trend of increasing commercialization at the southern end of the city's downtown area. The building was listed on the National Register of Historic Places in 1983.

== Description and history ==
The Bangs Block is located near the southern end of the built-up commercial downtown area of Springfield. It is on the north side of Main Street, between the Burbach Block and McKinney Building on the block demarcated by Crossett Lane and Cross Street. It is a four-story brick building, with Italianate styling. Its windows are set in segmented-arch openings topped by a soldier brick keystoned hoods, with bracketed red sandstone sills. The right side of the facade has brick quoining, and there is a tall cornice with multiple bands of brickwork. The ground floor houses a single commercial storefront, with the building entrance at the left.

The building was built in 1870 for John Bangs, who was operating a dry goods business in the Gunn and Hubbard Blocks on State Street, and moved it to this building. His son, Adam Bangs, used the space as a meat market, and it has seen a variety of commercial uses since then. The area was, at the time of construction, beginning a transition between a mixed residential-commercial area with smaller scale (two-story) buildings.

== See also ==
- Burbach Block, 1113-15 Main Street
- McKinney Building, 1121-27 Main Street
- National Register of Historic Places listings in Springfield, Massachusetts
- National Register of Historic Places listings in Hampden County, Massachusetts
