= James A. Clough =

American architect

James Amasa Clough
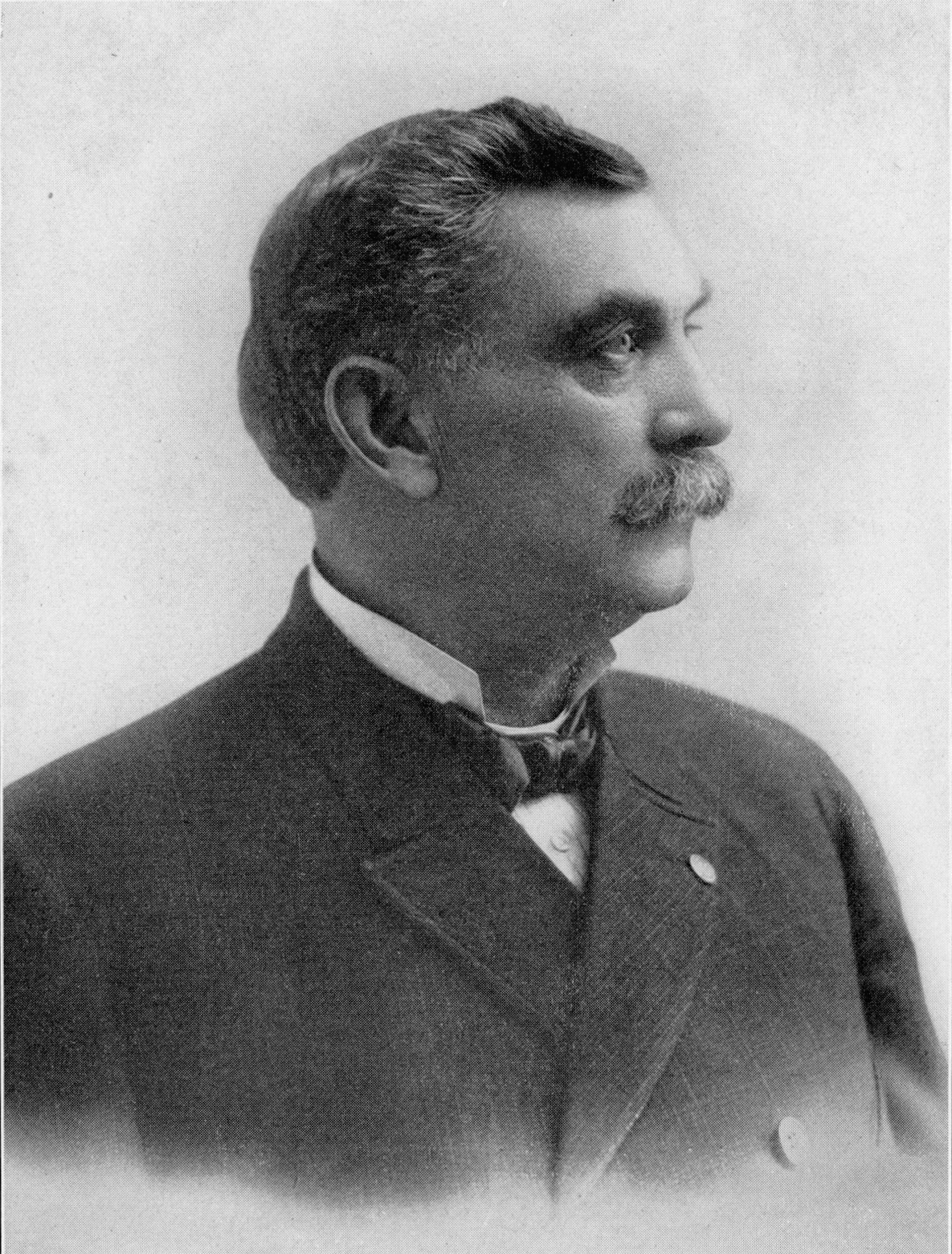
- Born: January 24, 1850; Chicopee, Massachusetts, U.S.
- Died: May 22, 1917 (aged 67); Holyoke, Massachusetts, U.S.
- Resting place: Forestdale Cemetery; Holyoke, Massachusetts
- Education: Massachusetts Institute of Technology
- Known for: Architect
- Political party: Republican
- Spouse: Elnora Celestia Shaw (m. 1871)
- Children: 3

James Amasa Clough (January 24, 1850 – May 22, 1917), often referred to as James A. Clough or J. A. Clough, was an American architect, carpenter, and contractor, who was active in New England, especially prominent in Western Massachusetts, and whose work shaped much of the architectural landscape of Holyoke during the late 19th and early 20th centuries. He would design several commercial blocks and public buildings there, such as the Holyoke Public Library, Canoe Club and the Mount Tom Summit House. The principal architect of the firm Clough & Reid, much of his work appeared under this name after 1890, when he made William B. Reid a partner- Reid having spent several years prior as Clough's draftsman. He remained principal of this firm until his retirement in 1907. One of Clough's other protégés, George P. B. Alderman, went on to establish his own architectural firm.

== Personal life ==
Born in Chicopee on January 24, 1850, to James and Cordelia Clough (née Palmer), Clough attended school until the age of 15. With the emergence of the Civil War, he left the classroom and entered the service of Company B of the 39th New Jersey Volunteer Infantry, seeing battle at the Siege of Petersburg. During the war, he endured a bout of black measles and sunstroke, and was at one point removed to a Newark hospital for treatment. He remained in the infantry for the duration of the war. He returned to Connecticut Valley and moved to Holyoke in 1870, a complete stranger with no money, and took up the trade of carpenter.

On July 5, 1871, he married Elnora Celestia Shaw at Prescott, Massachusetts. Elnora Shaw, a school teacher, was born in Prescott and taught grade school there, in Greenwich, and Holyoke. By this same time Clough had begun to take on work as a building contractor and sought to build on his skills further and become an architect. By day he continued his aforementioned trades, but soon after their marriage, Elnora began teaching him at night for his entrance exams to the Massachusetts Institute of Technology, then known as the Boston School of Technology. Upon completing his schoolwork in Boston, he immediately returned to Holyoke, and started an architectural practice.

Throughout his life he remained active in many civic institutions. He was a member of the local committee of the Republican Party, local chapter of the Grand Army of the Republic, a member of Mount Tom Lodge A.F. & A.M., the Independent Order of Odd Fellows, and the Boston Society of Architects. In addition to his work as an architect he also served as a trustee of the Holyoke Savings Bank. Following a period of illness, Clough died at his home in Holyoke on May 22, 1917, and was buried in Forestdale Cemetery.

== Career ==
Clough's design work was varied throughout his career; from the house of Mayor Arthur B. Chapin to the two main commercial blocks of Dwight and High Street, he and his firm maintained a noticeable presence in Holyoke, with additional work in other Connecticut Valley towns focusing on residential architecture. One of his earliest and most prominent works was a marble-clad hotel for local engineer and businessman John Delaney. Delaney's Marble Block, or the Marble Hall Hotel as it was often called, was designed by Clough and constructed in 1885. Withstanding a fire in 1902, and several smaller, the building stood at the corner of High and Dwight Street across from City Hall for more than 60 years, until it was razed in 1950 to make way for the more modern two-story storefront which stands there today.

Clough's North High Street Gateway

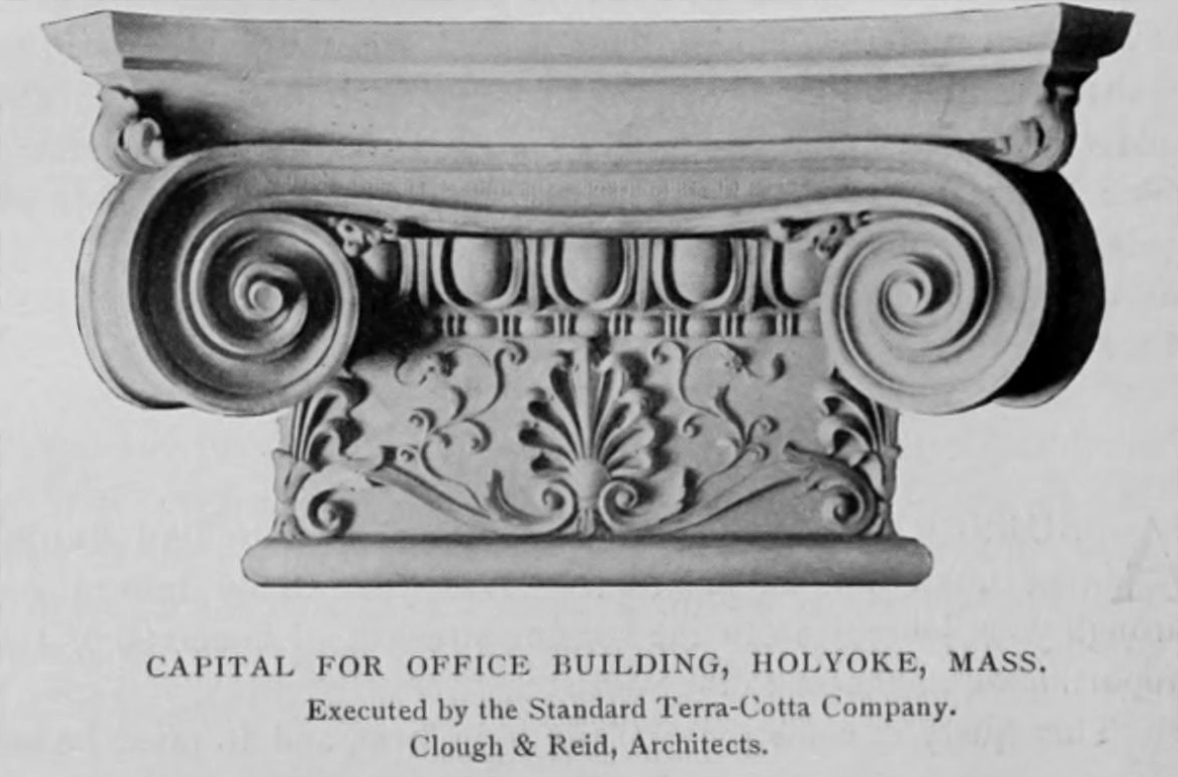
Capital terra cotta piece for the Ball Block/Latino Professional Building, the flame palmette is a recurring motif in Holyoke architecture

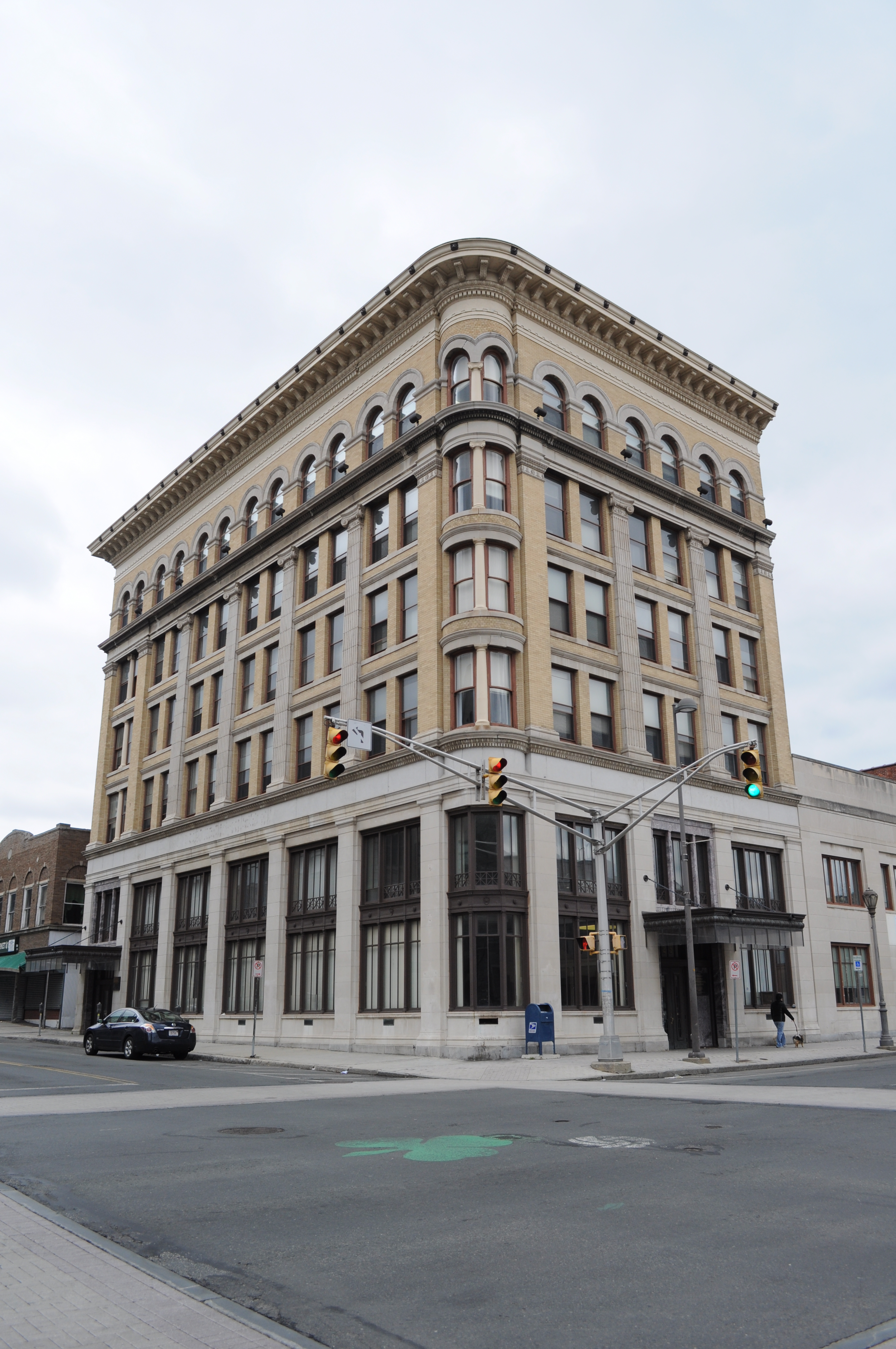
The Latino Professional Building as it appears today, on the corner of Dwight and High Street

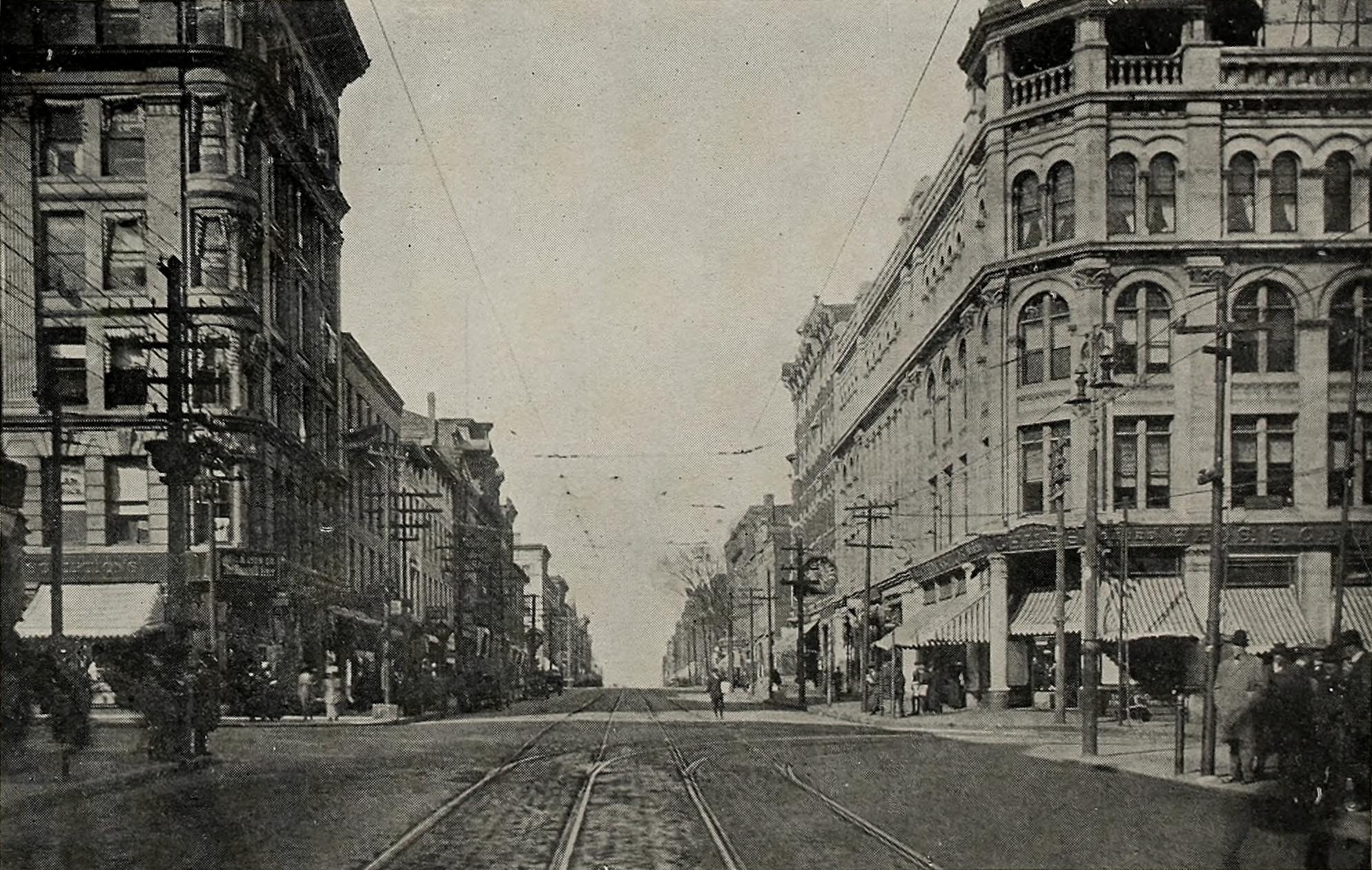
Ball Block and the Marble Block, both designed by Clough, on either side of High Street, c. 1910

Clough's architecture retains a legacy on High Street from a handful of remaining buildings today, including the Latino Professional Building on the opposite corner of Dwight and High from where the Marble Block once stood. Originally called the Ball Block for druggist Charles Ely Ball who operated his store out of there, the block was built in 1898. During the 20th century the building saw its first two floors modified extensively for the Holyoke National Bank which moved into the building in 1915, and subsequently modified it to its present appearance. In 2005 it was renovated by the New England Farm Workers' Council and rechristened The Latino Professional Building, receiving an award from the Massachusetts Historical Commission for its attention to original detail. The building's architectural details show influence Clough drew from Italianate palazzo style architecture, notably in its pillared corner windows, ornate capitals and cornices.

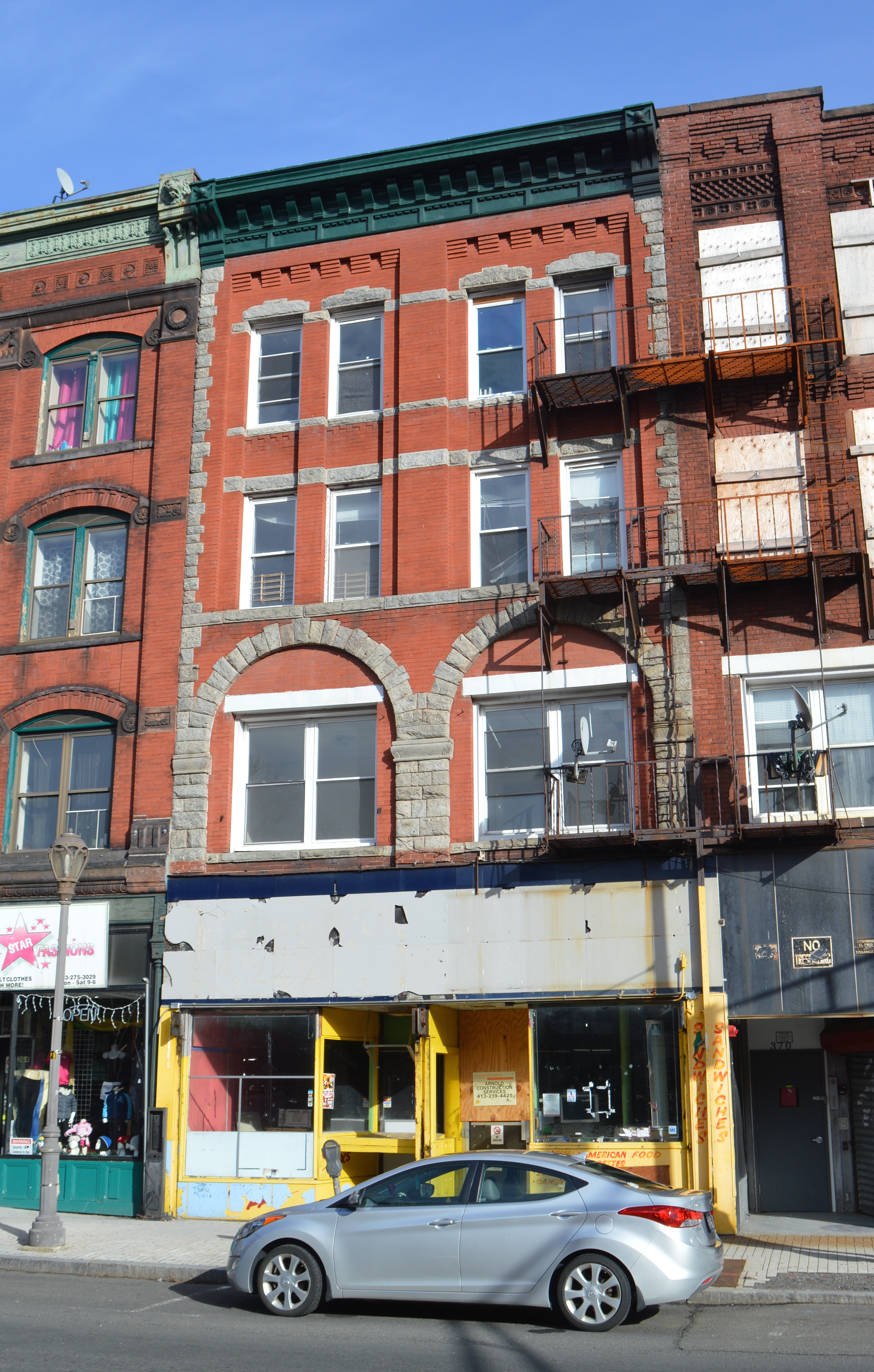
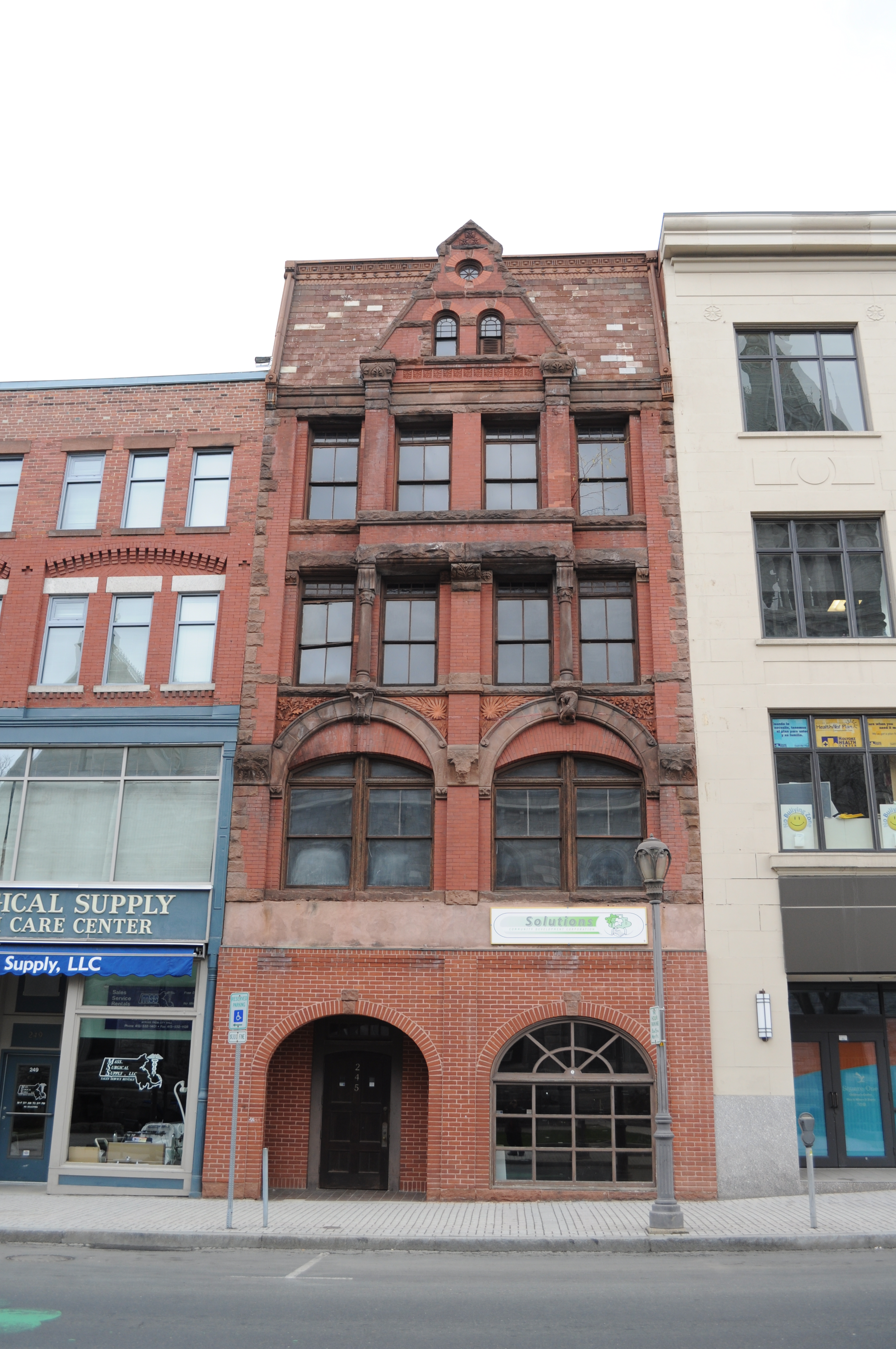
The Baker Building (left), and the Russell-Osborne Building, formerly known as Clough Block (right)

Clough also designed smaller Holyoke commercial blocks on High Street as well, including but not limited to, the Clough Building at 245 High Street, and the Baker Building at 368 High Street. The former is also known as the Russell-Osborne building as Clough leased it to the homonymous hardware store, while the latter was built for its namesake's stove and furnace business. Richardsonian Romanesque influence can be seen in Clough's commercial work, through the use of quarry-faced ashlar in broad arches on the second-stories of both buildings. Boston architectural historian Roger G. Reed also notes in his brief piece on Clough's work, that the use in arched windows on the second stories of such buildings may have been an aesthetic to indicate those floors were part of the storefront businesses at the time, however both buildings have seen their storefronts heavily modified and no original floor plans have been found to confirm this. Both buildings were constructed around the same time, with the Clough Building being constructed circa 1885, and the Baker Building completed in 1886. One significant departure between the two is Clough's use of a single dormer roof in his own building, along with a slate front facade evoking a pitched roof, whereas the building's structural roof is flat.

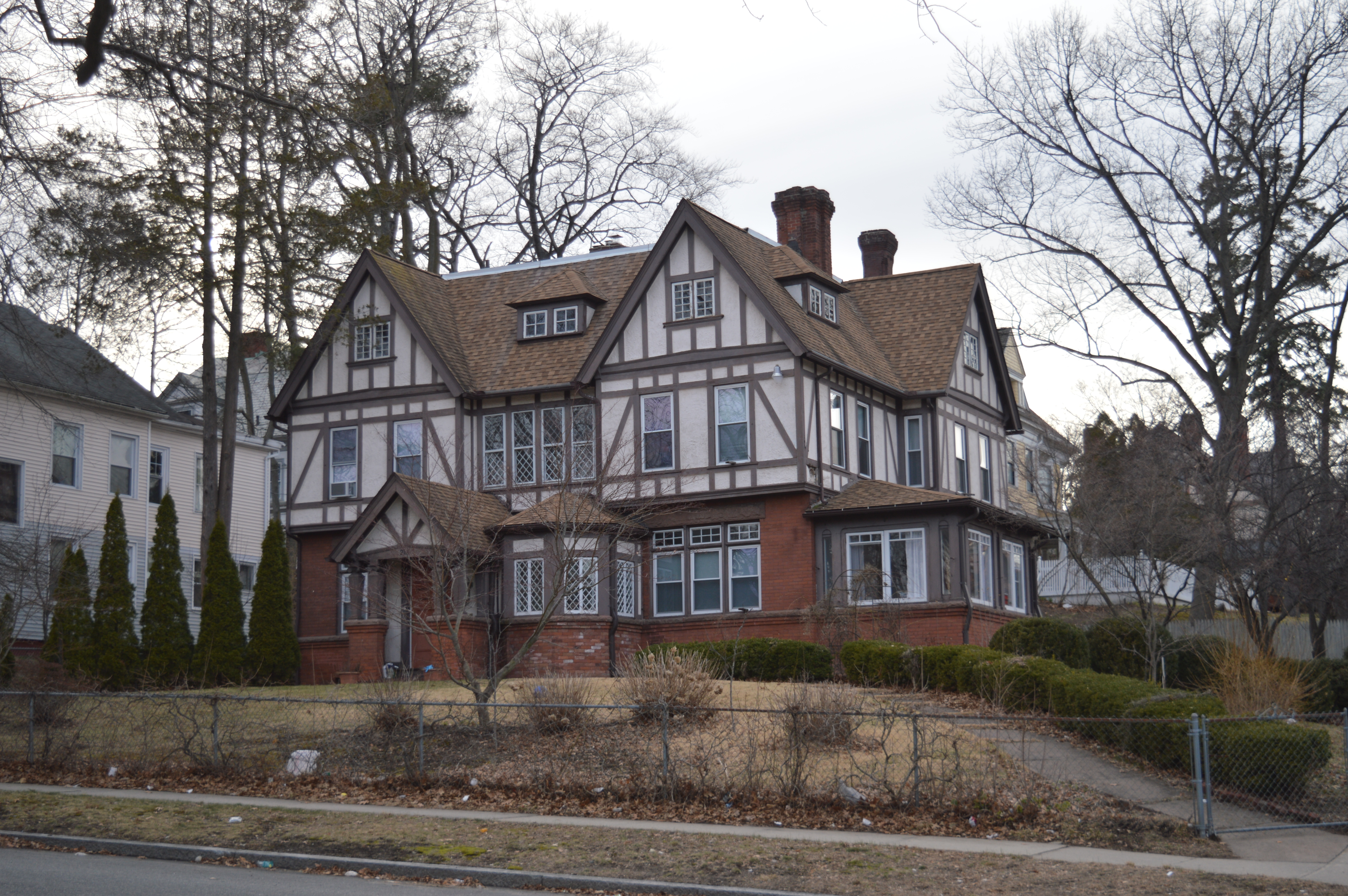
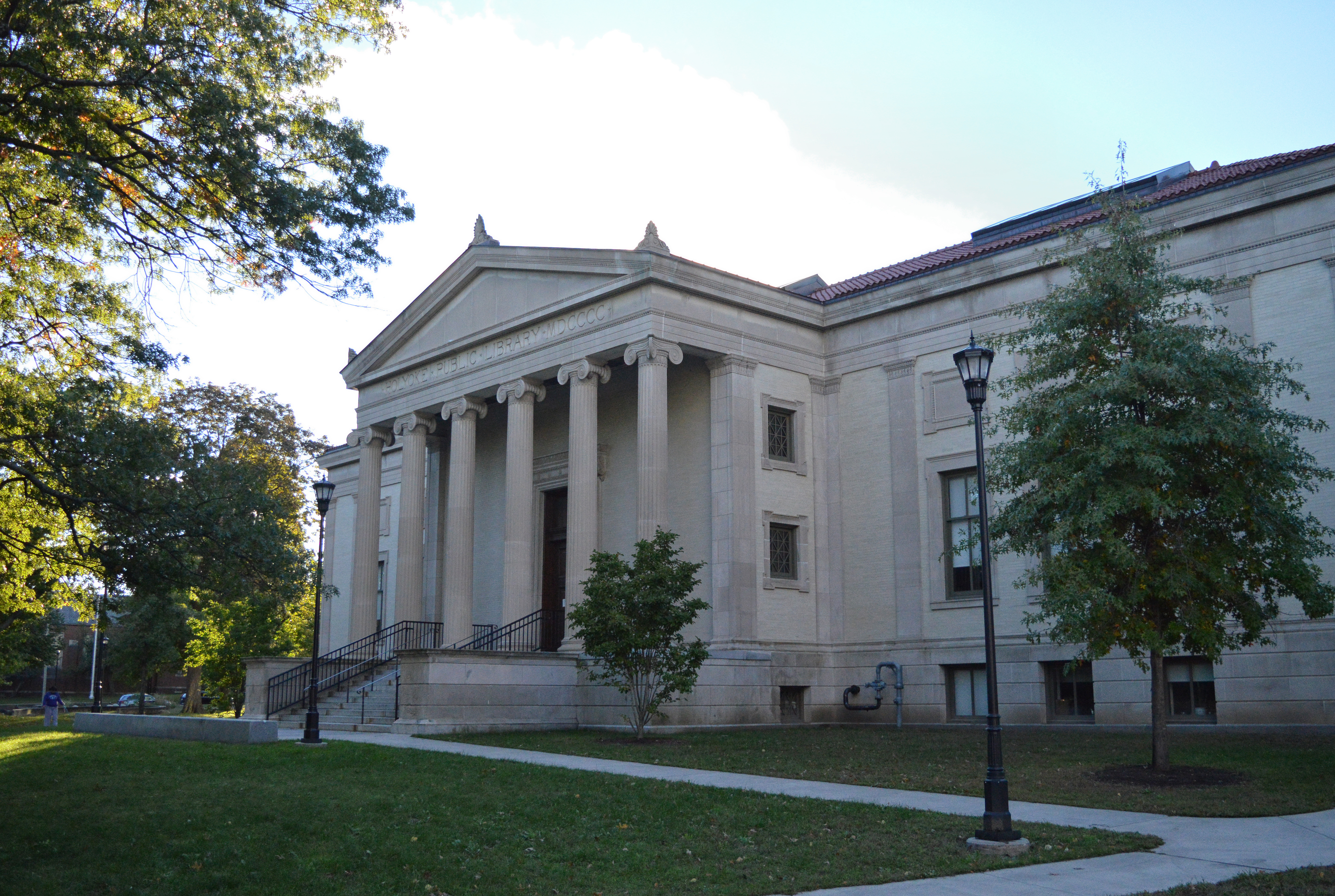
Clough's house for Mayor Arthur B. Chapin, an example of the Tudor Revival style in Holyoke today; Clough's Maple Street facade of Holyoke Public Library.

Clough also worked on multiple public spaces as well, including the Holyoke Canoe Club, which was built in 1898 in an Italianate style with towers, a stucco exterior, and four ornate towers at its corners. Though the towers have since been removed, the rest of the building endures today as a fixture in Smith's Ferry. It could be argued that Clough's most memorable legacy can be found in Holyoke Public Library building. Constructed in 1902 during the administration of Mayor Chapin, one of his previous clients, Clough donated his services to the city entirely pro bono, as his daughters had been patrons. The last major work attributed to Clough was one he also designed without pay; the Holyoke Home for the Aged was organized by the druggist C.E. Ball's wife, Elvira Fales (née Whiting), and constructed in 1911. The facility continues to serve senior citizens today as the Sarawood Retirement Community.

== Selected works ==
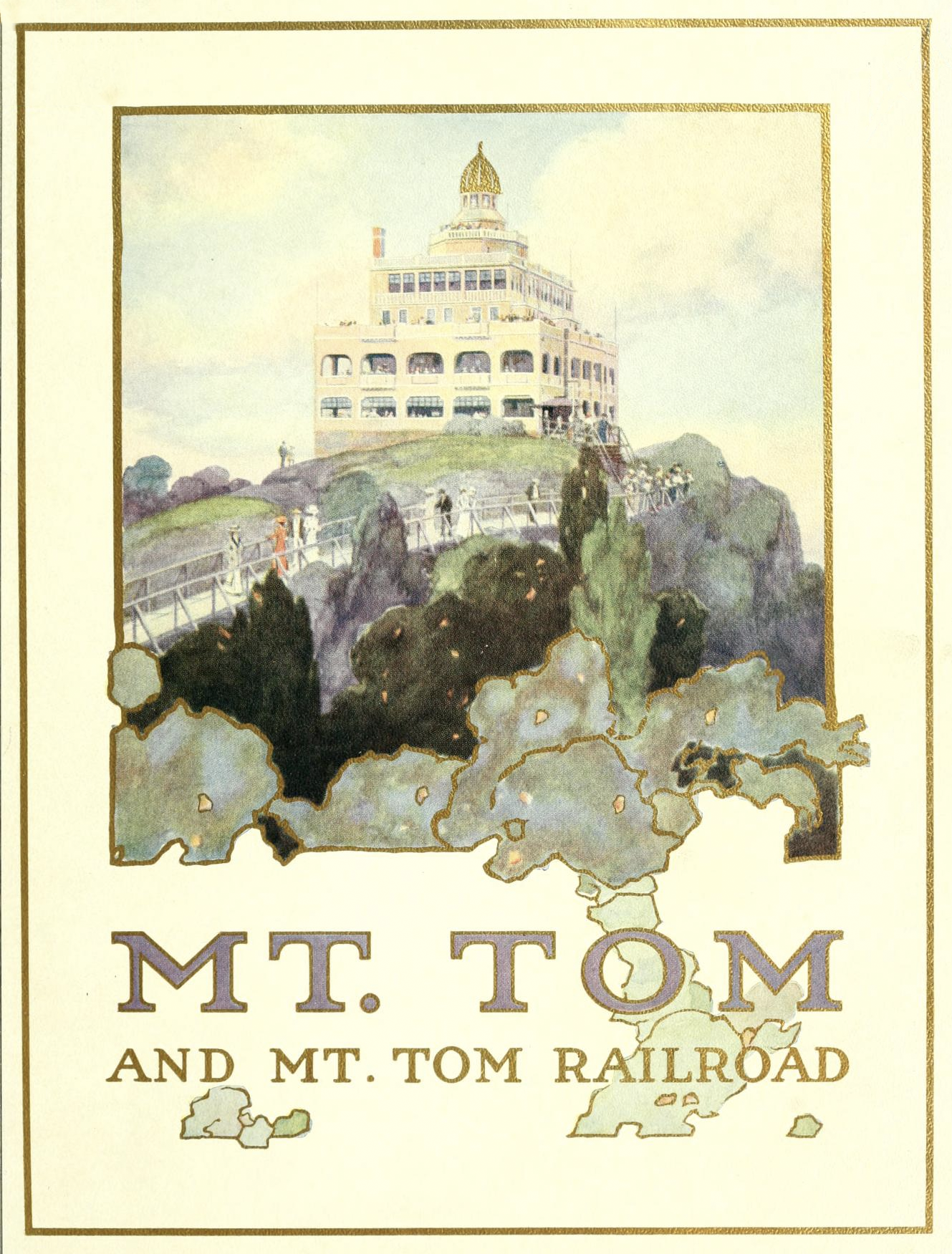
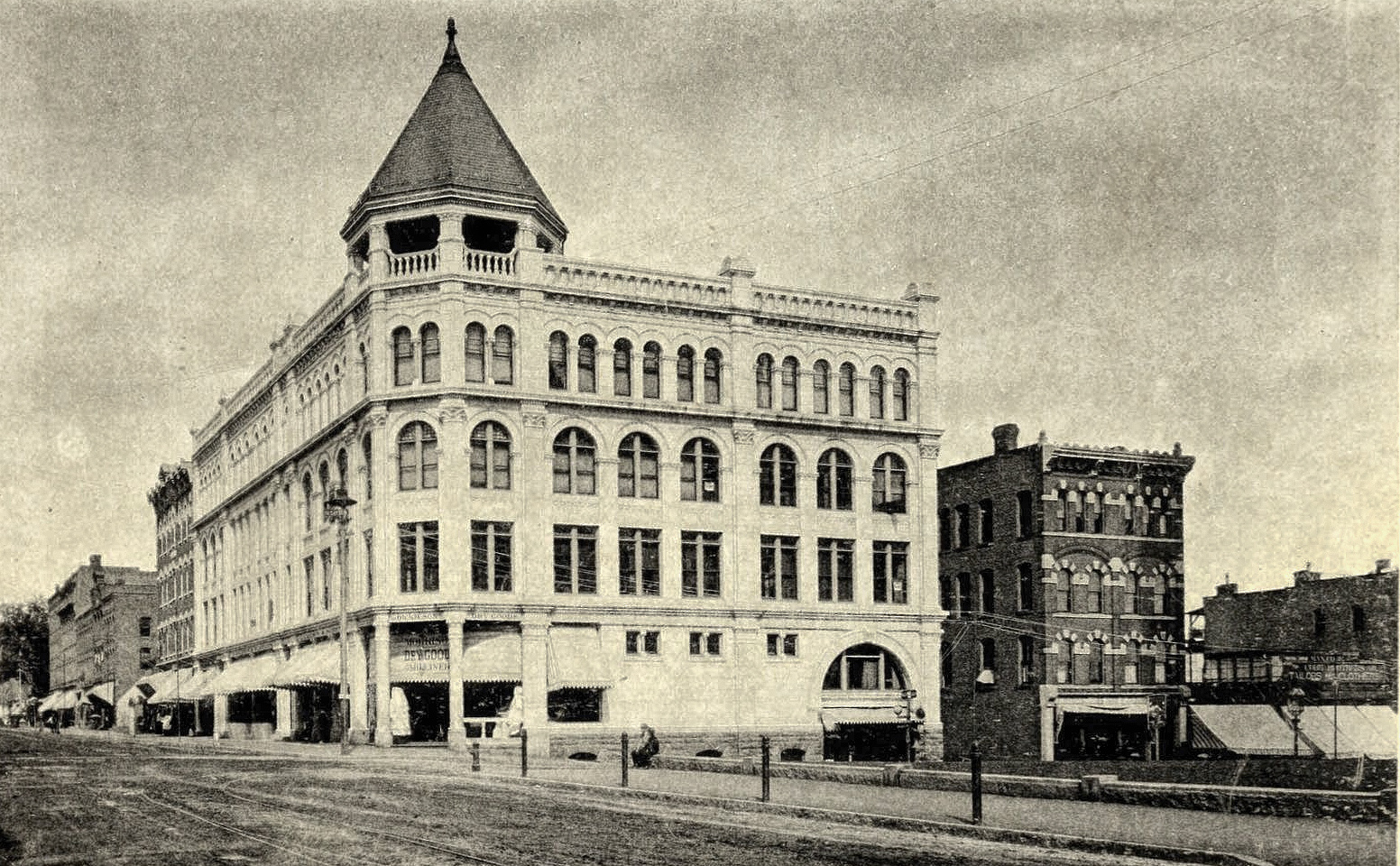
Painting of the Mount Tom Summit House (top) in a 1911 Holyoke Street Railway Company brochure, and the Marble Block (bottom) as it appeared in 1887; the two buildings, though demolished, represent some of Clough's most iconic work.

While many of their works outside of Holyoke remain poorly documented today, in Massachusetts alone, Clough & Reid were known to have designed structures in Boston, Springfield, Westfield, Chicopee, Northampton, Easthampton, Huntington, Worthington, and Monroe. Outside of the state, they were also known to have been contracted for jobs in Rutland, Vermont, Hinsdale and Keene, New Hampshire, and as far as Dayton, Ohio.

=== Holyoke ===
- Delaney's Marble Block (1885), demolished 1950
- Clough Building/Russell-Osborne Building (c. 1885)
- Herbert J. Frink House (c. 1885)
- Baker Building (1886)
- Martin C. Pfahler House (c. 1891)
- Charles B. Davis House (1891)
- William Syms/William F. Whiting House (1894)
- Addison L. Green House (1894)
- James M. Ramage House (1885)
- Arthur B. Chapin House (1897)
- Mount Tom Summit House (1897, rebuilt 1901), razed by fire 1929
- Ball Block/The Latino Professional Building (1898) (Note: Exterior of first two floors redone by Thomas Bruce Boyd, Inc. of New York with William Reid in 1914-1915, further description of alterations found in M. R. C. (July 1915). "Remaking A Building for a Bank". Architecture and Building. Vol. 47, no. 7. New York: William T. Comstock Company. pp. 246–254.)
- Holyoke Canoe Club (1898, burned 1909; current structure built 1910)
- Clough House (c. 1900)
- Holyoke Public Library (1902)
- Holyoke Home for Aged People (Sarawood) (1911)

=== Amherst ===
- William A. Burnett House (1897)

=== Springfield ===
- Henry J. Beebe House (1890), demolished c. 1925
- Highland Brewing Company Building (1897)
- Ryan-Methe Building (1898)

== See also ==
- George P. B. Alderman, who first began his architectural career under Clough
- Oscar Beauchemin, another Holyoke architect who was a contemporary
