= Chapin School (Chicopee, Massachusetts) =

- U.S. National Register of Historic Places
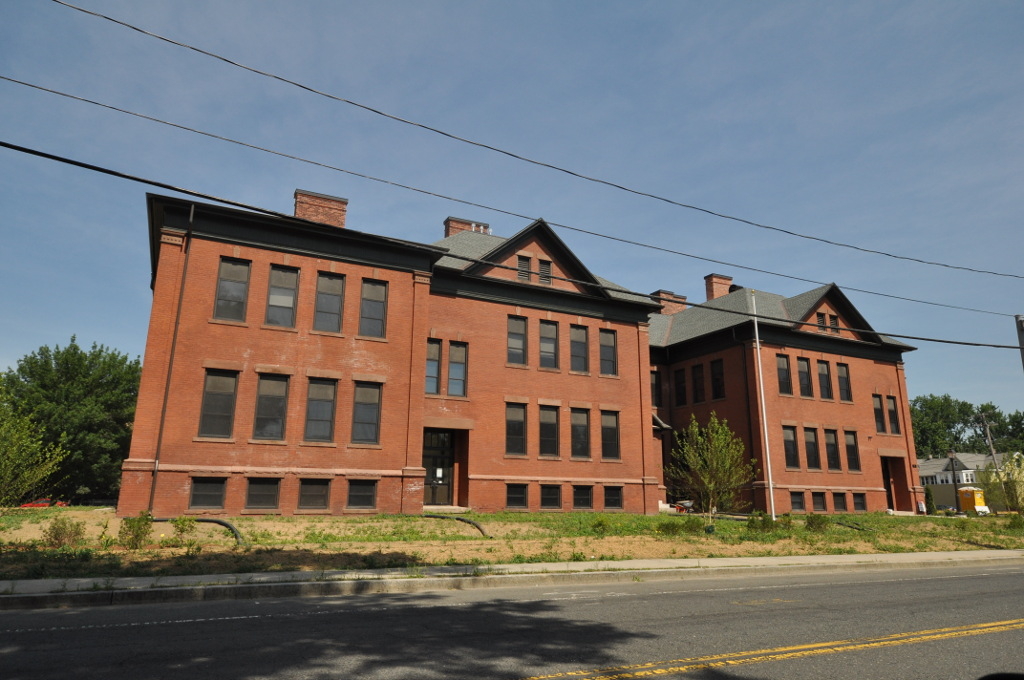

- Location within Massachusetts Location within the United States
- Location: 40 Meadow St., Chicopee, Massachusetts
- Coordinates: 42°11′5″N 72°36′36″W
- Built: 1899
- Architect: Alderman, George P. B.
- Architectural style: Classical Revival
- NRHP reference No.: 16000424
- Added to NRHP: July 5, 2016

The Chapin School is a historic former school building at 40 Meadow Street in Chicopee, Massachusetts. Built in 1899 and enlarged over the following 15 years, it is a prominent local example of Classical Revival architecture, and exemplifies city planning of the period, having been designed with growth in mind. The building, now converted to residences for homeless veterans, was listed on the National Register of Historic Places in 2016.

== Description and history ==
The former Chapin School building is located in the Willimansett area of northern Chicopee, on a triangular parcel bounded on the east by Meadow Street and the west by Chicopee Street (Massachusetts Route 116). It is a 2-1/2 story brick structure with three sections. The central section, the oldest portion of the building, is flanked on its left (west) by a similarly-sized section that butts directly against it, and has a second such section on the right, to which it is joined by a full-height hyphen. The right sections are covered by dormered hip roofs, while that of the left section is flat. Some building corners are pilastered, and the right sections each have entrances recessed in rectangular openings. A stringcourse of rusticated red stone separates the elevated basement from the ground floor. Windows on the first floor have red stone lintels and sills, while the third-floor windows have stone sills and brick soldier headers with central stone keystones.

The school was built in 1899 to a design by Holyoke architect George P. B. Alderman, and was named for the area's first English settlers, Jophet and Henry Chapin. Its construction was done by the city in response to the 1898 completion of the nearby Holyoke-Willimansett Bridge, which city planners expected to increase development in the area. Originally staffed by just three teachers, it had by 1915 grown to have seventeen, and it was the city's largest school. It served the city until 1995, when it was closed after fairview elementary opened. It then housed an alternative school into the early 2000s. It has now been converted into a cooperative residential complex for homeless veterans.

== See also ==
- National Register of Historic Places listings in Hampden County, Massachusetts
