= McKinney Building =

- U.S. National Register of Historic Places
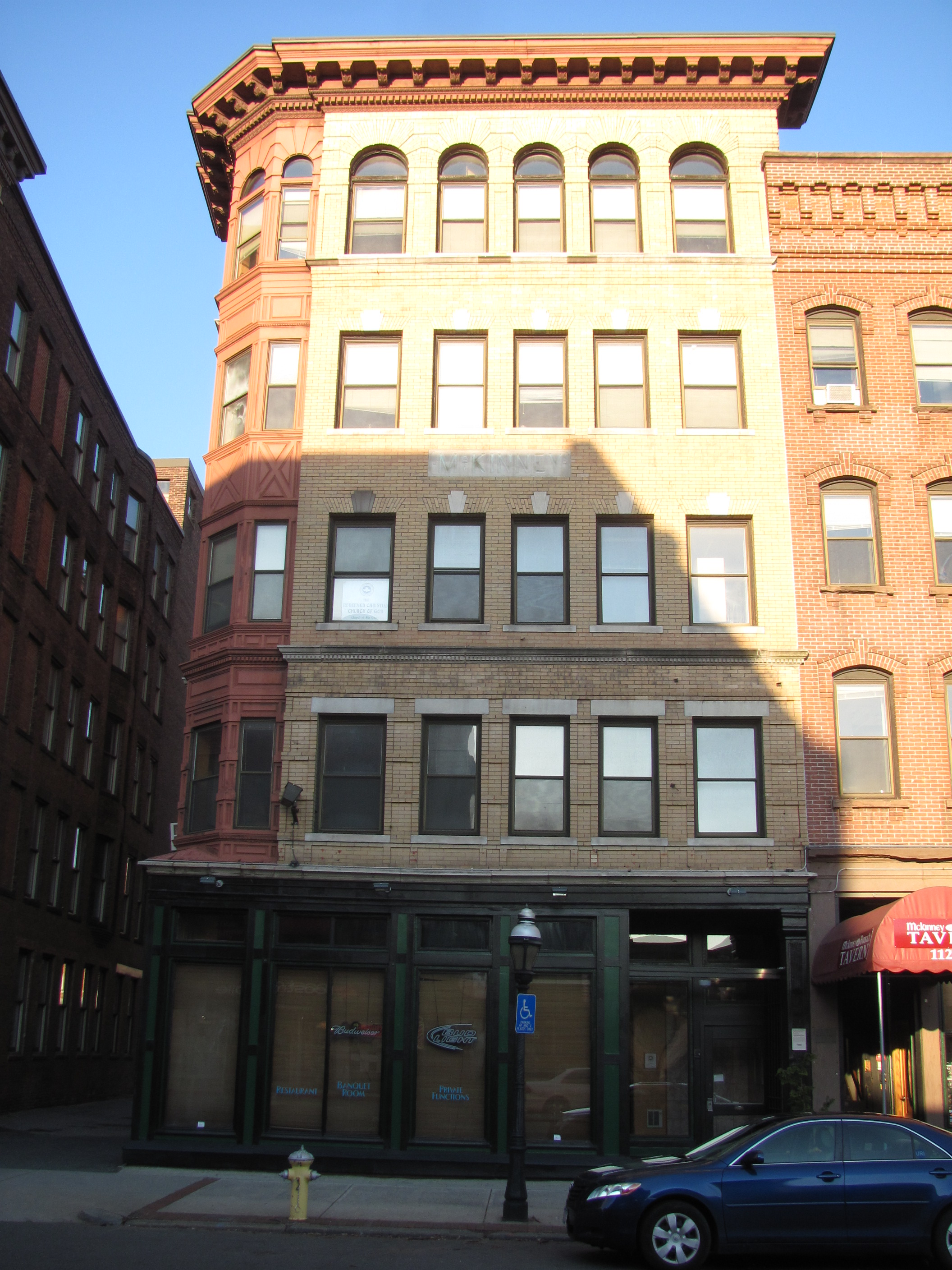

- Location within Massachusetts Location within the United States
- Location: 1121-27 Main St., Springfield, Massachusetts
- Coordinates: 42°6′0″N 72°35′10″W
- Built: 1905
- Architect: George P. B. Alderman
- Architectural style: Classical Revival
- MPS: Downtown Springfield MRA
- NRHP reference No.: 83000755
- Added to NRHP: February 24, 1983

The McKinney Building is a historic commercial building located at 1121-27 Main Street in Springfield, Massachusetts. It is locally significant as a good example of commercial Classical Revival architecture, and was part of generally southeastward trend in the growth of the city's downtown area.

== Description and history ==
The building is located near the southern end of the built-up commercial downtown area of Springfield. It is on the north side of Main Street, between the Bangs Block to the east and the Colonial Block located across Crossett Lane. It is a five-story masonry structure, built out of pale brick with red and white stone trim. The ground floor facing Main Street has a modern storefront, while the second floor has sash windows topped by splayed lintels. A corbelled beltcourse separates the second and third floors. The third and fourth floors have windows topped by splayed brick soldier headers with stone keystones. The fifth floor windows are set in round-arch openings, and the building is capped by a projecting dentillated and modillioned cornice. The corner at Main and Crossett is styled as a three-bay polygonal section in redstone, with decorative panel blocks between the windows of each bay.

The block was built in 1905, at a time when Springfield's downtown was growing to the south. It was built by developer Richard McKinney on land that formerly belonged to Jonathan Bangs (builder of the adjacent 1870 Bangs Block). The ground floor housed retail spaces, and the upper floors were in the early years used by First Spiritualist Society for their meetings and other social activities.

It was listed on the National Register of Historic Places on February 24, 1983.

== See also ==
- National Register of Historic Places listings in Springfield, Massachusetts
- National Register of Historic Places listings in Hampden County, Massachusetts
