= Guenther & Handel's Block =

- U.S. National Register of Historic Places
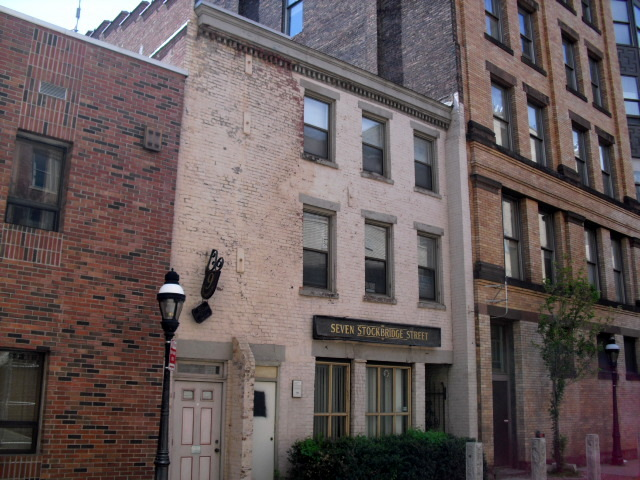

- Location within Massachusetts Location within the United States
- Location: 7-9 Stockbridge St., Springfield, Massachusetts
- Coordinates: 42°6′2″N 72°35′11″W
- Area: less than one acre
- Built: 1845
- Architectural style: Greek Revival
- MPS: Downtown Springfield MRA
- NRHP reference No.: 83000749
- Added to NRHP: February 24, 1983

The Guenther & Handel's Block is a historic commercial building at 7—9 Stockbridge Street in Springfield, Massachusetts. Built in 1845 by Elam Stockbridge, it is one of the oldest surviving buildings in the city's downtown area, and one of its rare examples of Greek Revival commercial architecture. It was listed on the National Register of Historic Places in 1983.

== Description and history ==
The Guenther & Handel's Block is located near the southern end of the built-up commercial downtown area of Springfield. It is on the east side of Stockbridge Street just north of its junction with Main Street, from which it is separated by the Colonial Block. It is a three-story brick building with vernacular Greek Revival styling. Its facade is essentially five bays in width, although the upper two floors only have windows in the three rightmost bays. The ground floor is arranged with a storefront in the right three bays, with display windows in the inner two and the entrance on the right. The building's left bays are both occupied by doors.

The block was built in 1845, and is one of the oldest commercial buildings in downtown Springfield. It was built for Elam Stockbridge, who laid out and began to develop Stockbridge Street in 1839. In the 1880s the ground floor business was a grocery shop, which in 1913 was acquired and operated by Emil Guenther and his brother-in-law, Richard Handel. The grocery operation had a local reputation for high-quality goods from around the world, and used the second floor of the building as a kitchen. It remained within the family and at the same location until 1972; the business was sold out of the family and moved to other premises in 1973.

== See also ==
- National Register of Historic Places listings in Springfield, Massachusetts
- National Register of Historic Places listings in Hampden County, Massachusetts
