= Colonial Block =

- U.S. National Register of Historic Places
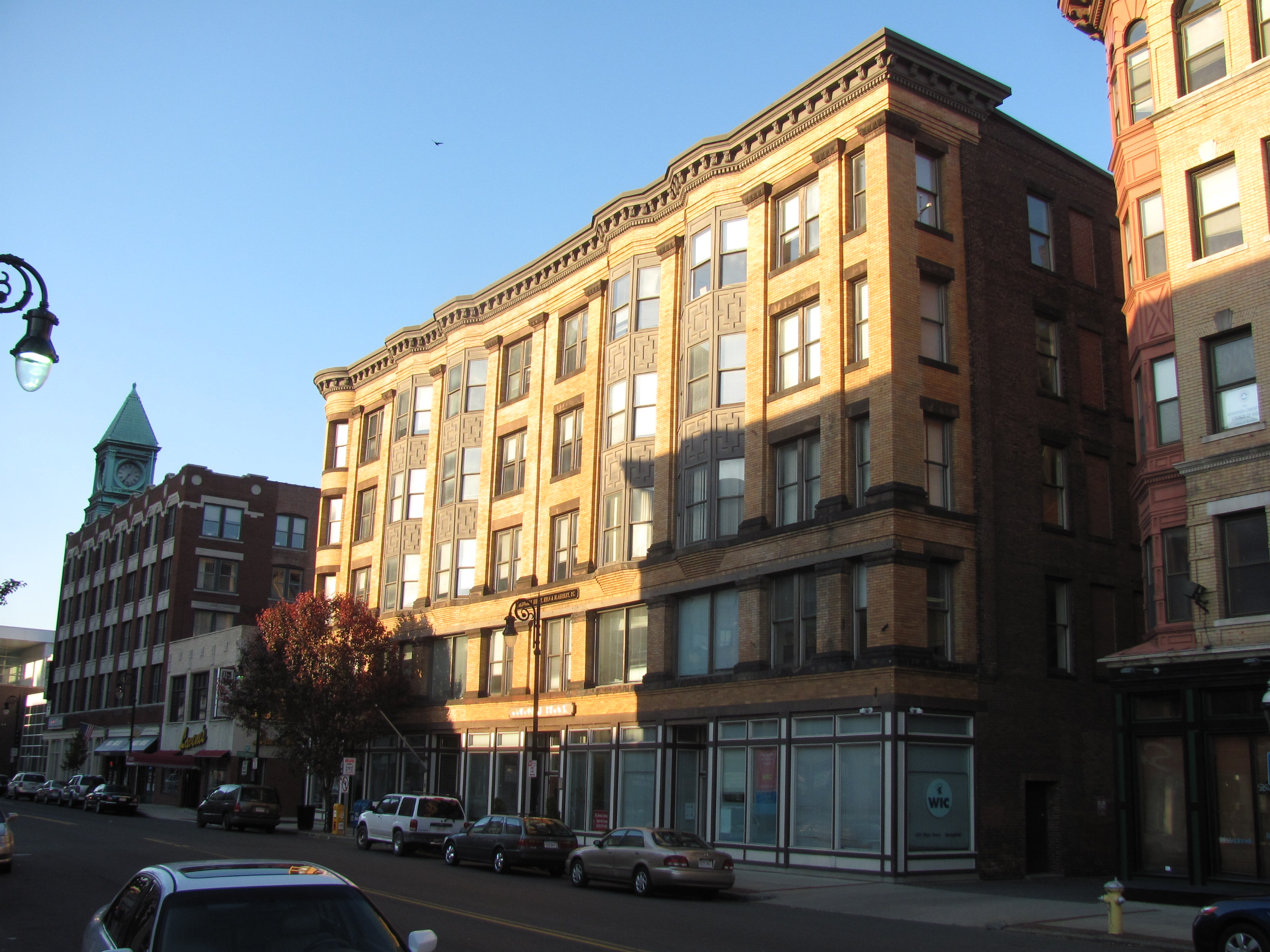
- Colonial Block

- Location within Massachusetts Location within the United States
- Location: 1139-55 Main St., Springfield, Massachusetts
- Coordinates: 42°6′1″N 72°35′11″W
- Built: 1902
- Architect: Morse, Paseal
- Architectural style: Colonial Revival
- MPS: Downtown Springfield MRA
- NRHP reference No.: 83000743
- Added to NRHP: February 24, 1983

The Colonial Block is a historic mixed-use retail, commercial, and residential block at 1139-55 Main Street in Springfield, Massachusetts. Built in 1902-05, it is a relatively rare example of a mixed use building from the period built to provide a mix of uses, in particular residential, at a time when most building in the area were built for commercial and retail purposes. It has also anchored the southern part of Springfield's downtown area where it begins transitioning to more residential use. It was listed on the National Register of Historic Places in 1983.

== Description and history ==
The Colonial Block is located near the southern end of the built-up commercial downtown area of Springfield. It is on the north side of Main Street at the southeast corner with Stockbridge Street, and is adjacent to the McKinney Building to the east, across Crossett Lane, and abuts the Guenther & Handel's Block on Stockbridge Street. It is five stories in height, with a facade of yellow brick and brown sandstone. The Main Street facade is eleven bays, articulated by brick pilasters with stone capitals on the upper levels. Projecting polygonal bays at intervals give the facade an undulating character, in part because the projections are continued in the elaborate bracketed cornice. The ground floor storefronts, of which there are three on Main Street, have been modernized, with plate glass display windows flanking recessed entrances.

The building was built as a speculative venture in 1902 by a local builder and real estate developer, Pascal Morse. It is a relatively rare example of a mixed use building from the period, in particular for its inclusion of residences, at a time when most building in the area were built for commercial and retail purposes. Its first floor was for built for retail use, the second floor housed offices and commercial space, and the upper three floors were residential. The building marked a transitional area between the urban downtown center of Springfield to the north, and more residential areas to the south. It also features distinctive Georgian Revival details not found on many other Springfield buildings. For many years, the principal retail tenant in the building was a furniture store.

== See also ==
- National Register of Historic Places listings in Springfield, Massachusetts
- National Register of Historic Places listings in Hampden County, Massachusetts
