= Gunn and Hubbard Blocks =

- U.S. National Register of Historic Places
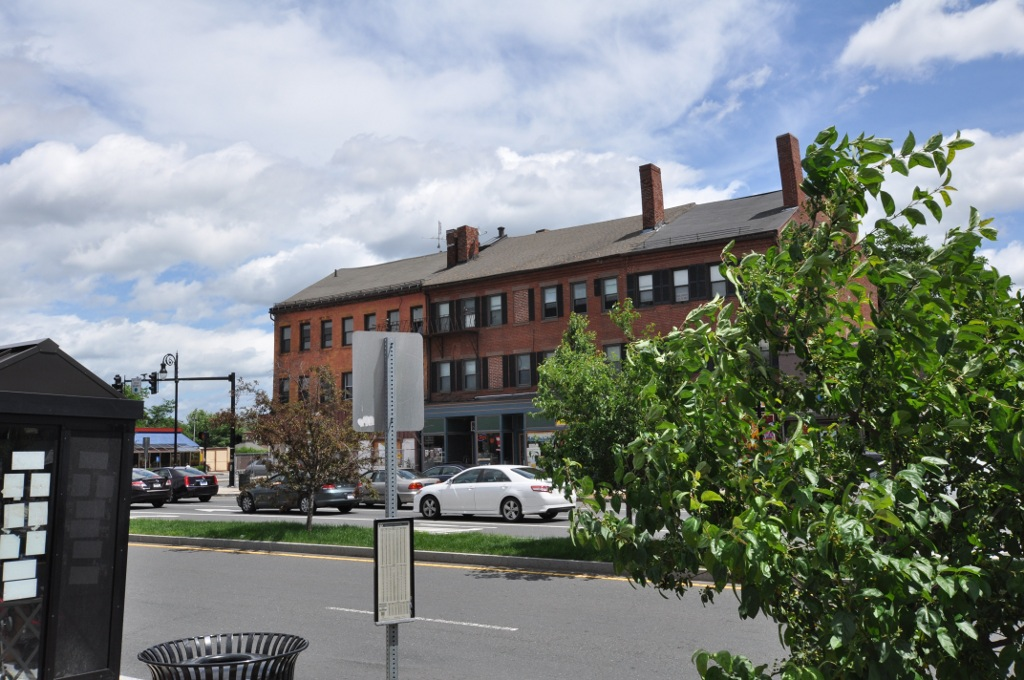

- Location within Massachusetts Location within the United States
- Location: 463-477 State St., Springfield, Massachusetts
- Coordinates: 42°6′27″N 72°34′40″W
- Area: less than one acre
- Built: 1830
- Architectural style: Federal
- NRHP reference No.: 80000474
- Added to NRHP: December 3, 1980

The Gunn and Hubbard Blocks are a pair of historic commercial-residential buildings at 463-477 State Street in the Old Hill section of Springfield, Massachusetts. Located across the street from the Springfield Armory, they were built in the 1830s, and are two of the oldest commercial buildings in Springfield. The buildings were listed on the National Register of Historic Places in 1980.

== Description and history ==
The Gunn and Hubbard Blocks are located northeast of downtown Springfield, on the south side of State Street at its junction with Walnut Street. They are set facing north toward the historic Springfield Armory grounds, across State Street. They are brick buildings of similar late Federal style, 3-1/2 stories in height, and are joined by a party wall. The Gunn Block (473-477 State Street) is seven bays wide, and has a slightly trapezoidal shape, owing to its position on the street corner. The ground floor has two storefronts flanking a center entrance, which provides access to the residential spaces on the upper floors. The Hubbard Block (461-471 State Street) is eleven bays wide. Built in two stages, its older portion is like the Gunn Block seven bays, with a similar configuration, including chimneys at each end. The extension is four bays, and also has chimneys at the outer end.

The Gunn Block was built in 1830 by Elisha Gunn, who traded in goods from the West Indies. The Hubbard Block was built five years later by Asahel Hubbard, an inspector at the Armory, as a real estate venture. His principal tenant was Jonathan Bangs, the operator of a local grist mill, and the second floor housed a large meeting space used by community groups such as the Masons. As the 19th century progressed, the center of commerce in Springfield moved to what is now the downtown area, but these two blocks continued to serve the neighborhood's needs until the 1890s, when Winchester Square became more important.

== See also ==
- National Register of Historic Places listings in Springfield, Massachusetts
- National Register of Historic Places listings in Hampden County, Massachusetts
