= Lucyan Bójnowski =

Lucyan Bójnowski (February 5, 1868 - July 28, 1960) was a Polonia activist and Catholic priest who served as pastor in New Britain, Connecticut.

== Life ==
He grew up in a noble family in Świerzbutów, Poland from which he gained a strong sense of public service for the less fortunate. He escaped Poland under Russian occupation to avoid conscription. He arrived in the United States in 1888 and studied at Saints Cyril and Methodius Seminary at Orchard Lake, Michigan, a highly-Polish settlement at the time.

== New Britain ==
He became an ordained priest and led the construction of Sacred Heart Parish in New Britain, Connecticut. He drew many parishioners and Polish immigrants flocked to his growing church, expanding its construction and design. A Polish bank, printing operation, and newspaper were started within his church. He fought against a growing dissatisfaction with the Catholic Church among his parishioners, who wanted to establish an independent church like the Polish National Catholic Church. He was vocal in fighting back against these voices, and remained an influential voice of Polonia, although at odds with Francis Hodur and the Polish National Catholic Church. John B. Frantz of the Pennsylvania State University identifies Bojnowski as entirely "pragmatic" in that he stayed loyal to the Catholic Church despite his own aversion to the Irish and German domination because he viewed Polish leadership as possible, and wanted to "substitute his own strong leadership for that of an alien bishop." He never reached the status of bishop, but his influence was felt among Polonia politically. He was very active in Polish issues nationally and recruited Polish parishioners for World War I and World War II. His influence among Polonia had decreased by the time of World War II, according to historian James S. Pula, who wrote, "his often unbecoming rhetoric helped to drive further wedges in Polonia at the expense of unity in support of Poland."

Bojnowski was most vocal about the issue of increasing Americanization of Polish Americans and their children. He expressed dismay and pessimism about a Polish identity in America, saying that the immigration restrictions of the 1920s had "cut off the branch from its trunk", a metaphor for the separation Poles in America experienced from their ancestral homeland. He was active in the Polish American Congress, but Buczek identified that his sermons and political speeches degenerated into polemics against his political adversaries, and his divisive rhetoric drew away many parishioners. A new church, Holy Cross Parish in New Britain, Connecticut, is identified as being built as a direct result of his conflict and authoritarian positions later in life.

In 1946, he was elevated to monsignor in recognition of his past work building the parish and its cathedral. At the time of his death, he had served 65 years as pastor. In a biography of his life, Immigrant Pastor by Buczek, there is a suggestion that the failed at the endeavor most important to him, preserving Polish identity among his parish.

== Sources ==
- Daniel Buczek. Immigrant Pastor: The life of the right Reverend Monsignor Lucyan Bójnowski of New Britain, Connecticut. 1974.
- James S. Pula. Polish American Encyclopedia. p. 37 Bojnowski, Lucyan
- Dolores Liptak, review of Daniel S. Buczek, People of God: A Centennial History of Sacred Heart of Jesus Parish, New Britain, Connecticut (1998), in Catholic Historical Review 85:2 (1999), pp. 324–325.
- John B. Frantz (1975). Review of Daniel S. Buczek 'Immigrant Pastor: The Life of the Right Reverend Monsignor Lucyan Bojnowski of New Britain, Connecticut' Church History, 44, pp 545–545. doi:10.2307/3163858.
