= George P. B. Alderman =

American architect

George Perkins Bissell Alderman
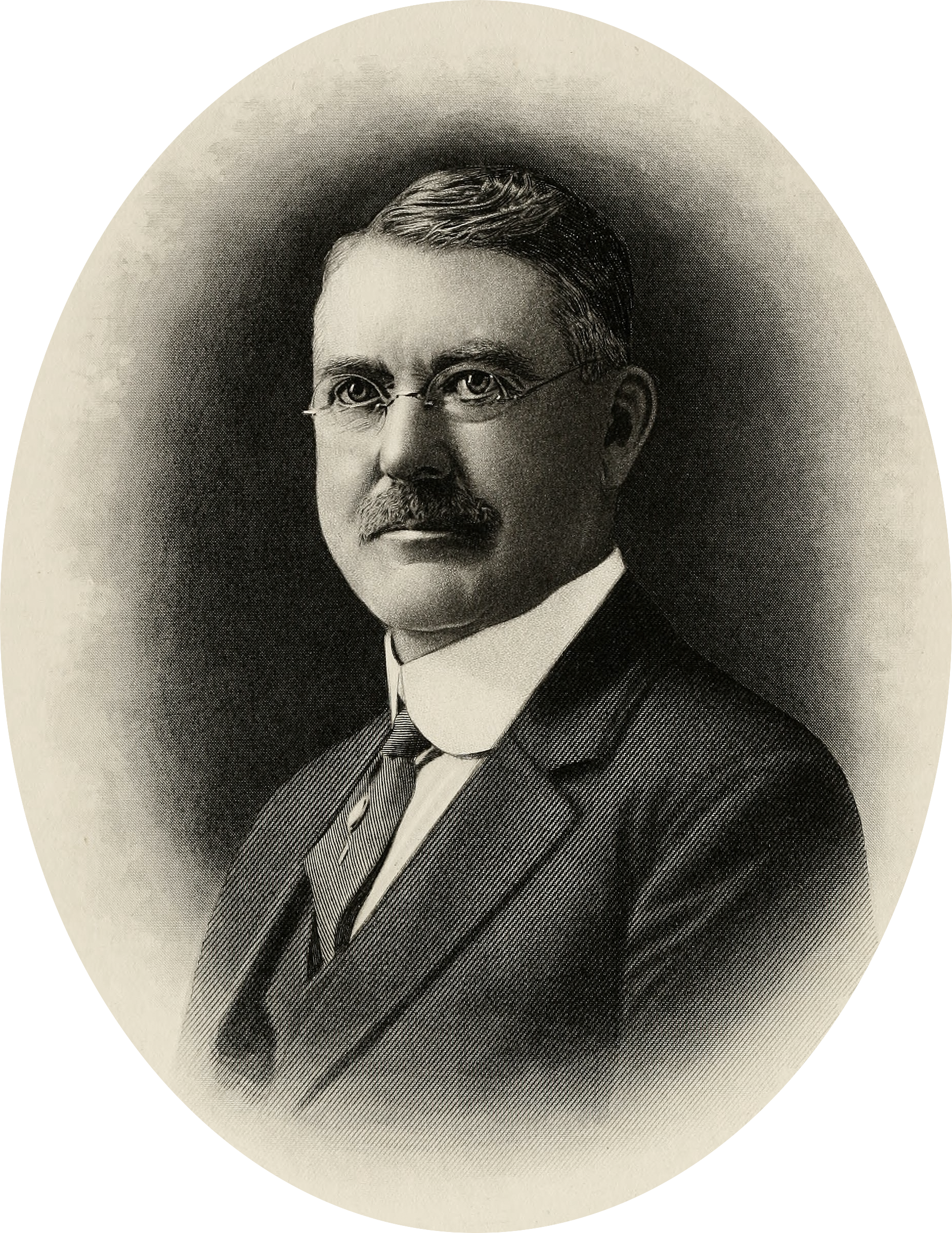
- Engraved portrait of Alderman, c. 1925
- Born: September 20, 1862; Tariffville, Connecticut, U.S.
- Died: November 3, 1942 (aged 80); Holyoke, Massachusetts, U.S.
- Known for: Architect
- Spouses: Clara Belle Drake; Inez B. Goslee
- Children: 10

George Perkins Bissell Alderman (September 20, 1862 – November 3, 1942), often referred to as George P. B. Alderman was an American architect who was active in western Massachusetts and Connecticut during the late 19th and early 20th Century.

== Childhood and architectural training ==
George Perkins Bissell Alderman was born September 20, 1862, to Eugene Clydon and Ellen Eliza (née Holmes) Alderman. His full name, including the two middle initials he displayed throughout his life, derived from his father's Civil War service. Wounded in the Battle of Chancellorsville, Eugene Alderman was given up for dead until Captain George Perkins Bissell of the 25th Connecticut Infantry noticed his movement. Picking up the soldier and strapping him to his horse, he rode him to the nearest hospital, and in a feeling of indebtedness, the elder Alderman chose to name his first-born son after the man who saved him. As a young child he worked on the family farm and as a carpenter, and also attended school in East Granby, CT. The family moved to Plainville, Connecticut, where he attended school for a year, then worked at country store. In 1879 his family moved to Holyoke, Massachusetts, where he worked with his father as a carpenter.

Eventually Alderman realized that he really desired to be an architect and to that end he entered the office of James A. Clough, architect, of Holyoke, where he worked for 5 years. He then moved to Chicago where he found work in the offices of Cass Chapman, a prominent architect.

== Architectural practice ==
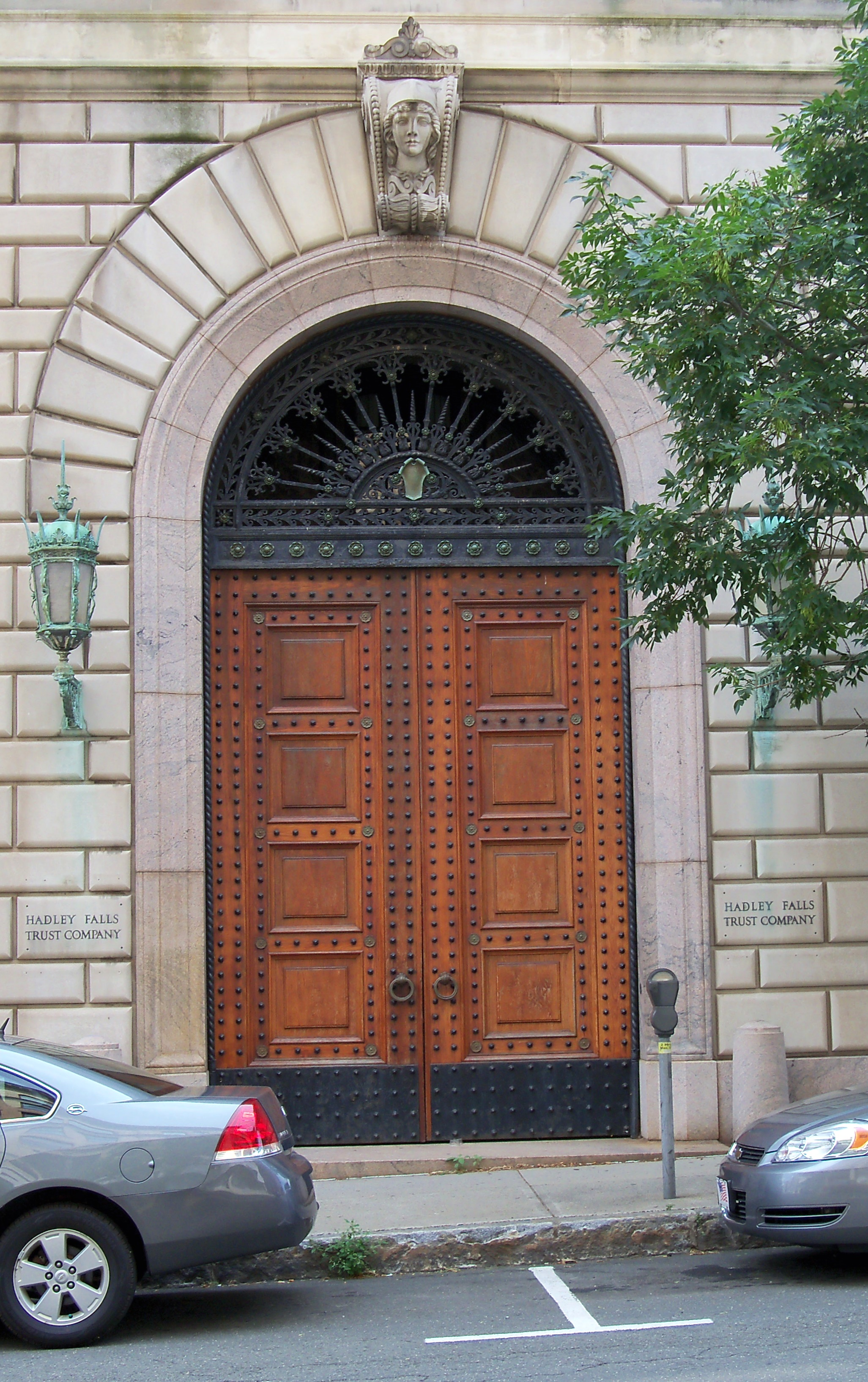
Grand door of the Hadley Falls Trust Company Building; Alderman was also a member of the board of directors of that institution

In 1885, Mr. Alderman returned to Holyoke and opened his own architectural office where he was later joined by his brother, Henry. The firm name was George P. B. Alderman & Company. The business was very active from the start building churches, schools and public buildings for a varied clientele.

Among these he would construct religious and meetinghouse buildings for a wide variety of groups, including Catholic, Lutheran, Episcopal, and Baptist Churches, as well as at least one synagogue, a Freemason temple, a labor union hall, and spaces for various ethnic benefit societies such as the Alsatian-Lorrainian Union. He and his firm would design buildings in a number of architectural styles, including but not limited to, Gothic Revival, Italianate, Neoclassical, Richardsonian Romanesque, Victorian, and a few later examples of Art Deco.

== Personal life ==
Alderman's son, Bissell Alderman was also an architect who attended the Massachusetts Institute of Technology and had a long and distinguished career serving many New England clients. The younger Alderman would also serve two terms as president of the Western Chapter of the American Institute of Architects.

Alderman was very active in civic affairs. He was a director of the Hadley Falls Trust Company, a trustee of the People's Savings Bank, and a member of the finance committee. He was a member of the Second Baptist Church of Holyoke, a member of the Holyoke Lodge of Odd Fellows, Mt. Tom Lodge, Free and Accepted Masons, and the Engineers' Society of Western Massachusetts.

== Works include ==
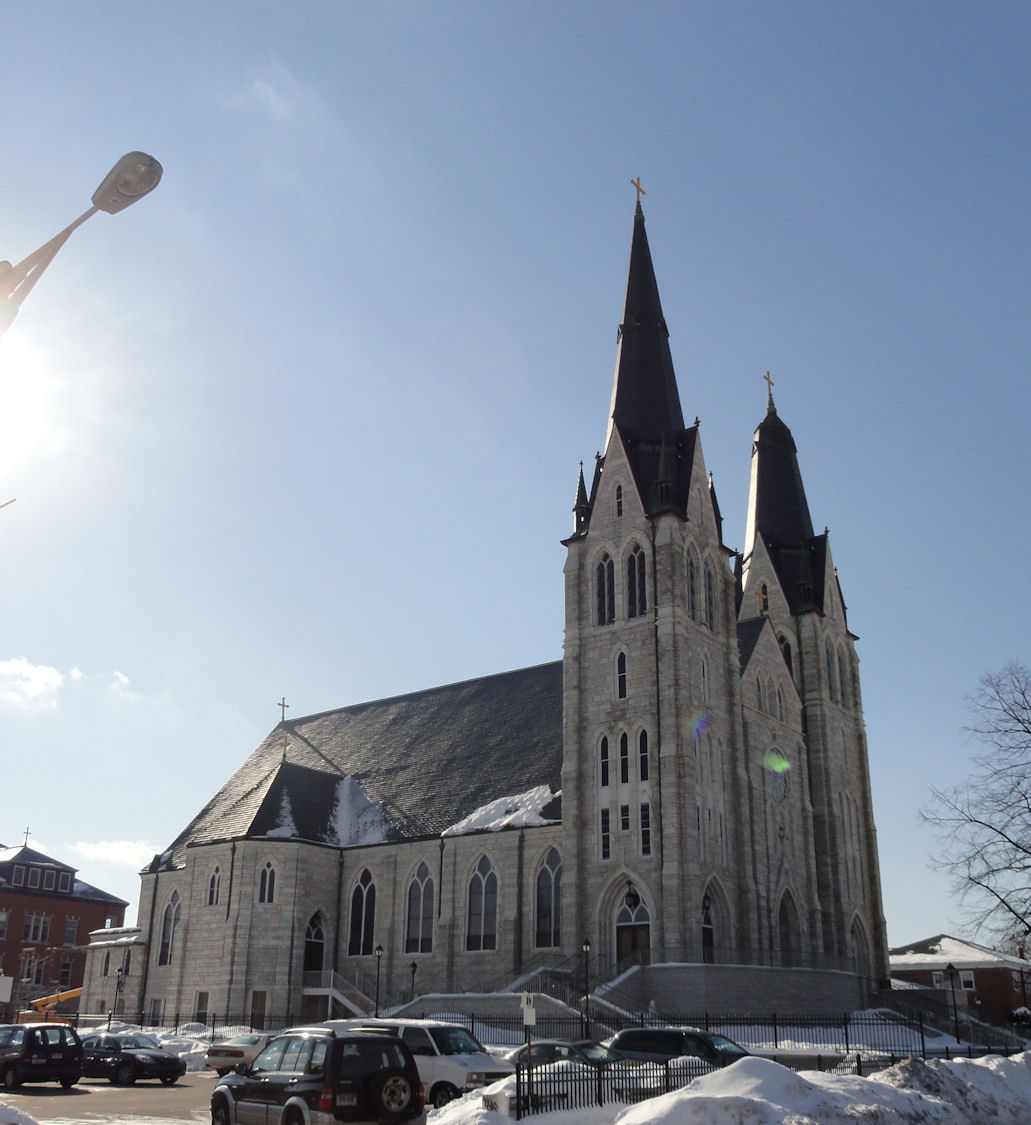
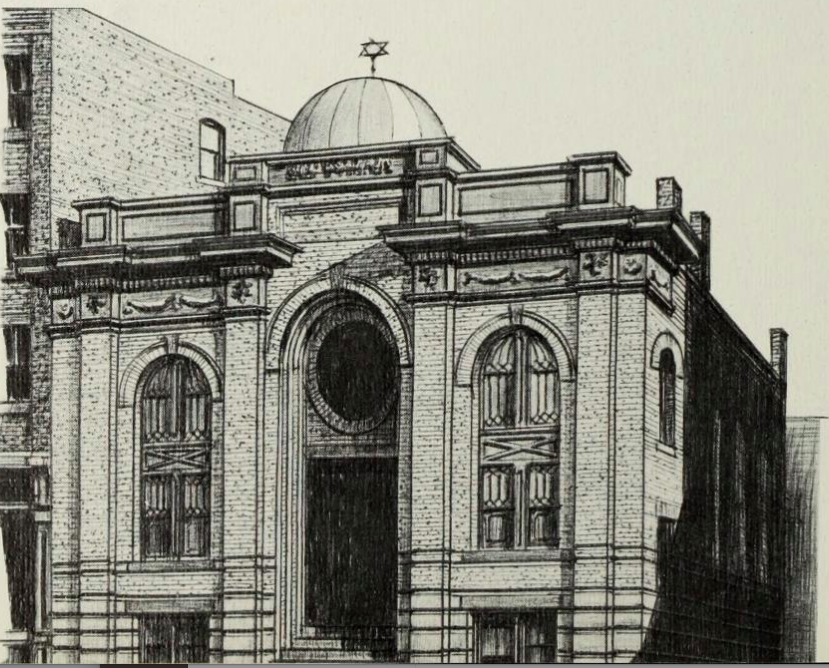
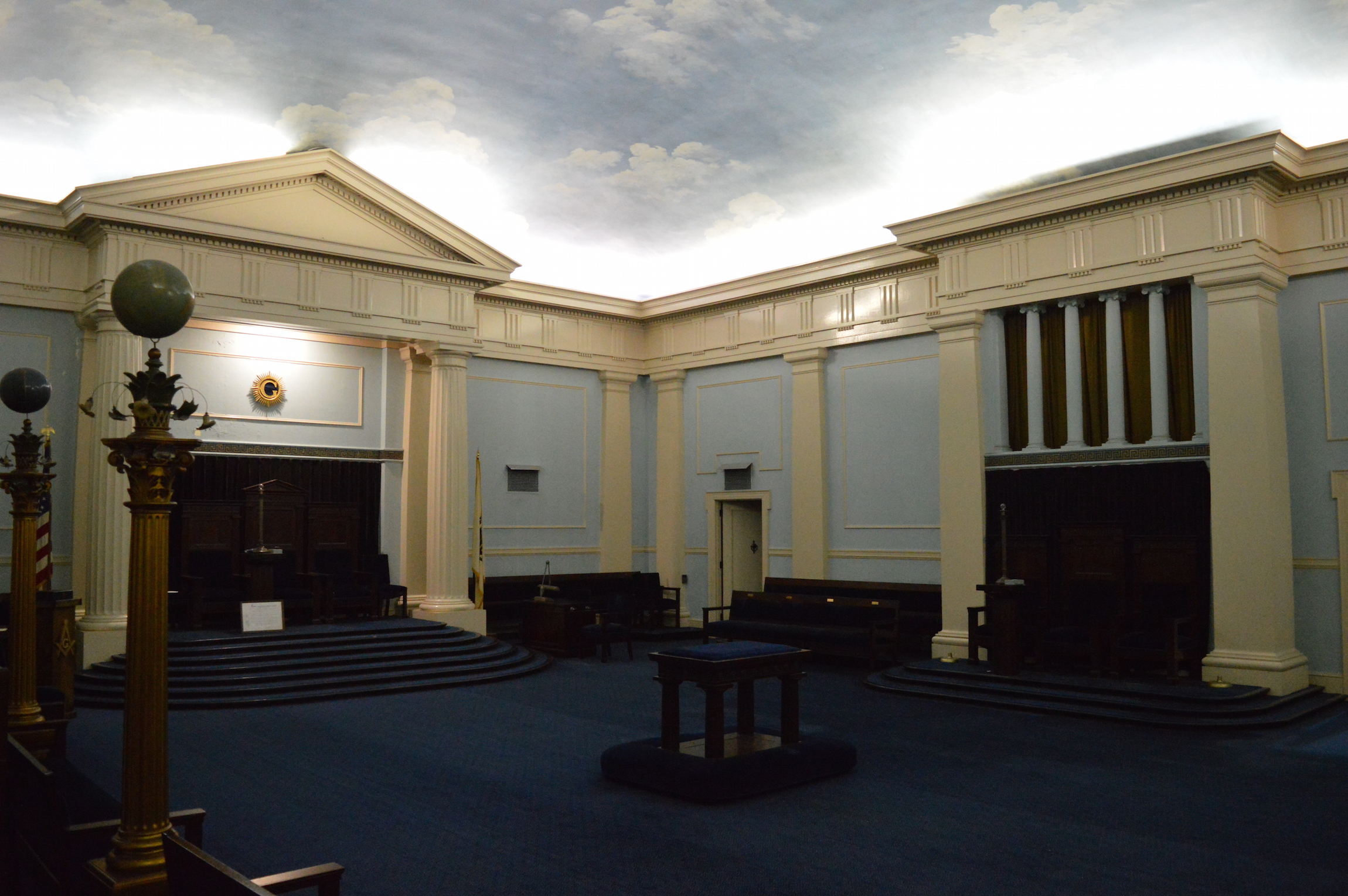
Top to bottom: Sacred Heart Church in New Britain, Connecticut; the former Rodphey Shalom Synagogue, of Holyoke, Massachusetts; interior of the Classic Room of the Holyoke Masonic Temple; examples of several ornate buildings that Alderman and his firm designed

=== Connecticut ===
- German Lutheran Church, Hartford, Connecticut (1901)
- German Lutheran Church, Terryville, Connecticut (1901)
- Sacred Heart Church, New Britain, Connecticut (1903)
- St. Michael the Archangel Church, Bridgeport, Connecticut (1921)

=== Massachusetts ===
- Clovis Robert Block, Holyoke, Massachusetts (1881)
- Childs Building, Holyoke, Massachusetts (1884)
- Taber Block, Holyoke, Massachusetts (1884)
- Rigali Building, Holyoke, Massachusetts (1884)
- Chapel for the First Congregational Church, Holyoke, Massachusetts (1887)
- First Methodist Episcopal Church, Holyoke, Massachusetts (1889)
- Rectory of the Precious Blood Church, Holyoke, Massachusetts (1891)
- The Elmwood, commercial block, Elmwood, Holyoke, Massachusetts (1897)
- Willimansett School (Chapin Elementary School), Chicopee, Massachusetts (1897)
- Holyoke High School, Holyoke, Massachusetts (first building, 1898)
- French Roman Catholic Church, Willimansett section of Chicopee, Massachusetts (1898)
- Senior Block, Holyoke, Massachusetts (1898)
- German Lutheran Church, Holyoke, Massachusetts (1899)
- Steiger Building, Holyoke, Massachusetts (1899)
- Endeavor Baptist Chapel, Holyoke, Massachusetts (1900)
- Mater Dolorosa Parish, Holyoke, Massachusetts (1901)
- Alsace-Lorraine Union of America Lodge, Holyoke, Massachusetts (1903)
- Rodphey Sholem Synagogue, Holyoke, Massachusetts (1903)
- Saint Jean-Baptiste Church, Ludlow, Massachusetts (1905)
- Friedrich Block, Holyoke, Massachusetts (1908)
- The Union Club/The Brian Boru, Holyoke, Massachusetts (1909)
- Germania Mills Worker Housing/"Battleship Block", Holyoke, Massachusetts (1911)
- Hermannshalle (Sons of Hermann Hall), Holyoke, Massachusetts (1912), now Dr. Mother Elouise Franklin Church
- Willimansett School- North Addition, Chicopee, Massachusetts (1912)
- The Orient Restaurant, Holyoke, Massachusetts (1919)
- Mount Tom Lodge Masonic Temple, Holyoke, Massachusetts (1920)
- Second Baptist Church, Holyoke, Massachusetts, alterations (1921)
- Hadley Falls Trust Company Building, Holyoke, Massachusetts (1927)
- United States Post Office–Holyoke Main, Holyoke, Massachusetts (1933)

=== New York ===
- German Lutheran Church, of St. John, Port Richmond, New York (1901)

== See also ==
- James A. Clough, whose firm Alderman once practiced at
- Oscar Beauchemin, Holyoke architect who was a contemporary of Alderman
