= Friedrich Block =

- U.S. National Register of Historic Places
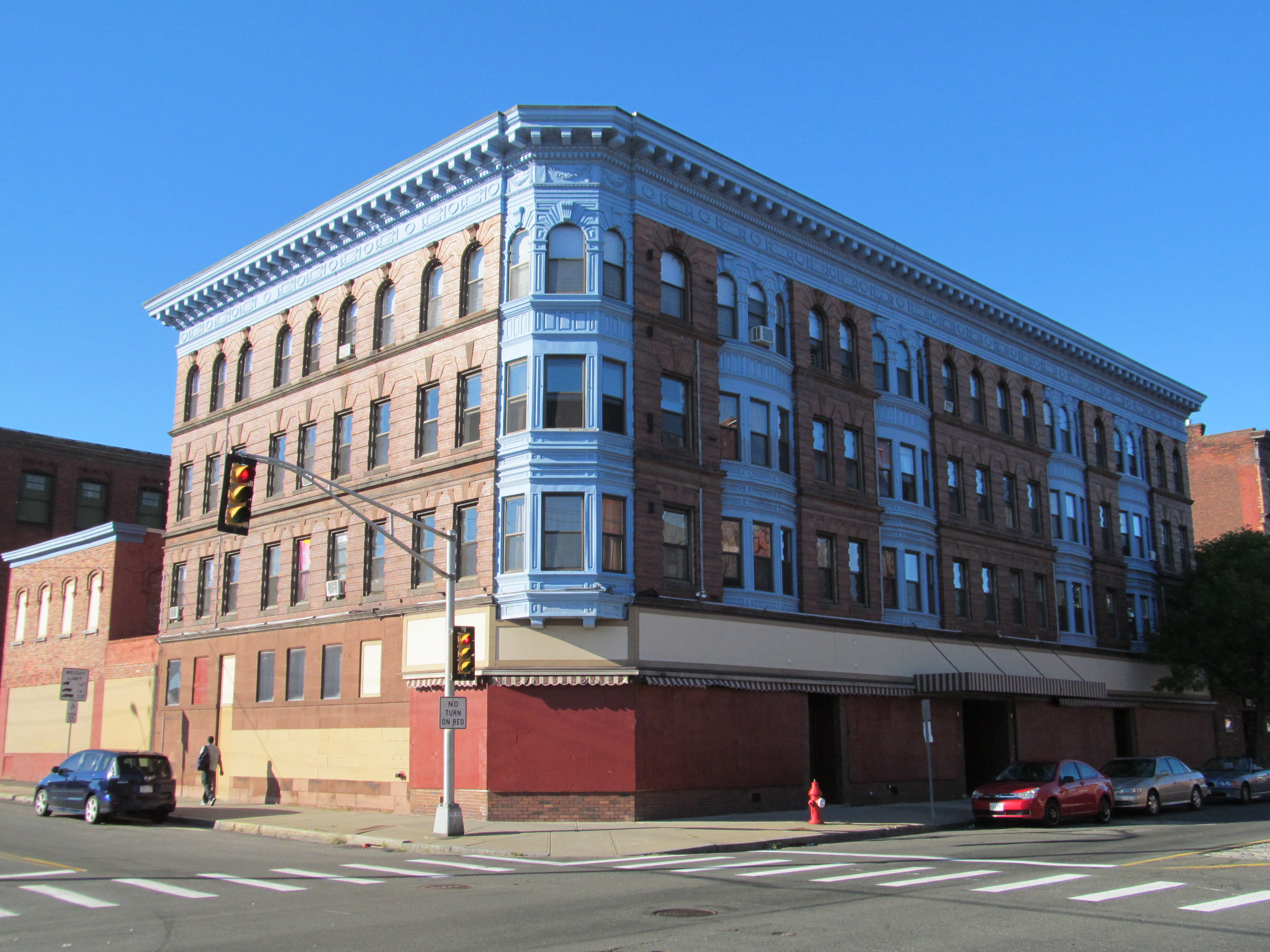
- Friedrich Block

- Location within Massachusetts Location within the United States
- Location: Holyoke, Massachusetts
- Coordinates: 42°11′52″N 72°36′36″W
- Built: 1908
- Architect: Alderman, George P.B.
- Architectural style: Renaissance
- NRHP reference No.: 02001473
- Added to NRHP: December 5, 2002

The Friedrich Block is a historic mixed-use commercial and residential block at 449-461 Main Street (the corner with Sargeant Street) in Holyoke, Massachusetts. Built in 1908, it is a significant Renaissance Revival work by the local architect George P. B. Alderman, and for its association with the E.H. Friedrich Company, a manufacturer of metal architectural parts. The building was listed on the National Register of Historic Places in 2002.

== Description and history ==
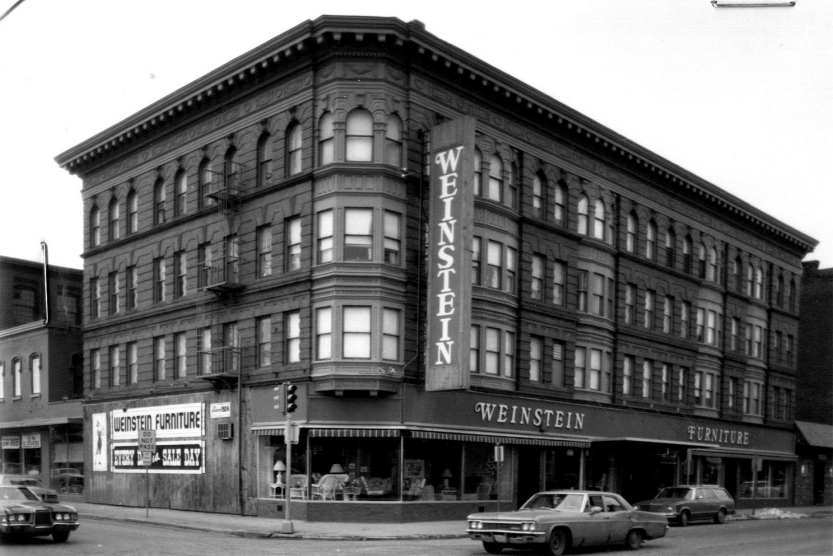
Top to bottom: Logo of the E. H. Friedrich Company, which commissioned the building; a photo of Friedrich Block from the state historical commission file, c. 1984 when the lower floor was occupied by a local furniture store

The Friedrich Block occupies a prominent location in downtown Holyoke, at the northwest corner of Main and Sargent Streets. It is a four-story brick structure with a diversity of Renaissance Revival styling on its street-facing exteriors. The ground floor is finished mainly in dressed brownstone, although it as also been significantly altered by its commercial tenants over the years. The upper floors are organized into groups of window bays set in brick, with intervening slightly projecting bay windows finished in metal. The brick is laid to give a banding effect, which alters to form keystone-like forms above the windows. Windows on the second and third floors are set in rectangular openings, while those on the third floor are set in round-arch openings. The building is crowned by a projecting metal cornice, with garlanding, dentil work and modillions.

The building was constructed in 1908 by the E.H. Friedrich Company, a manufacturer of metal architectural parts with a factory in the city; it was designed by local architect George P. B. Alderman, and the company's metal parts may have been used in its construction. At the time of the building's construction the city was engaged in an effort to build housing that was more resistant to fire than wood frame tenements. This building was designed to house fifteen residential units and three storefronts. The building has undergone only modest alterations over the years, principally by the commercial tenants on the ground floor. Its longest-serving commercial tenant was the Weinstein Furniture Company, which operated on the premises from 1926 to 1995; Samuel Weinstein purchased the building in 1948. The apartments, which housed an ethnic diversity of primarily factory workers, saw significant wear as well as damage from vandalism. The building has recently been rehabilitated. Its commercial space is now occupied by the Monte de Santidad Apostolic Christian Church.

== See also ==
- National Register of Historic Places listings in Hampden County, Massachusetts
