= Sacred Heart Parish (New Britain, Connecticut) =

Church building in New Britain, Connecticut

Coordinates: 41°40′22.8″N 72°47′19.4″W

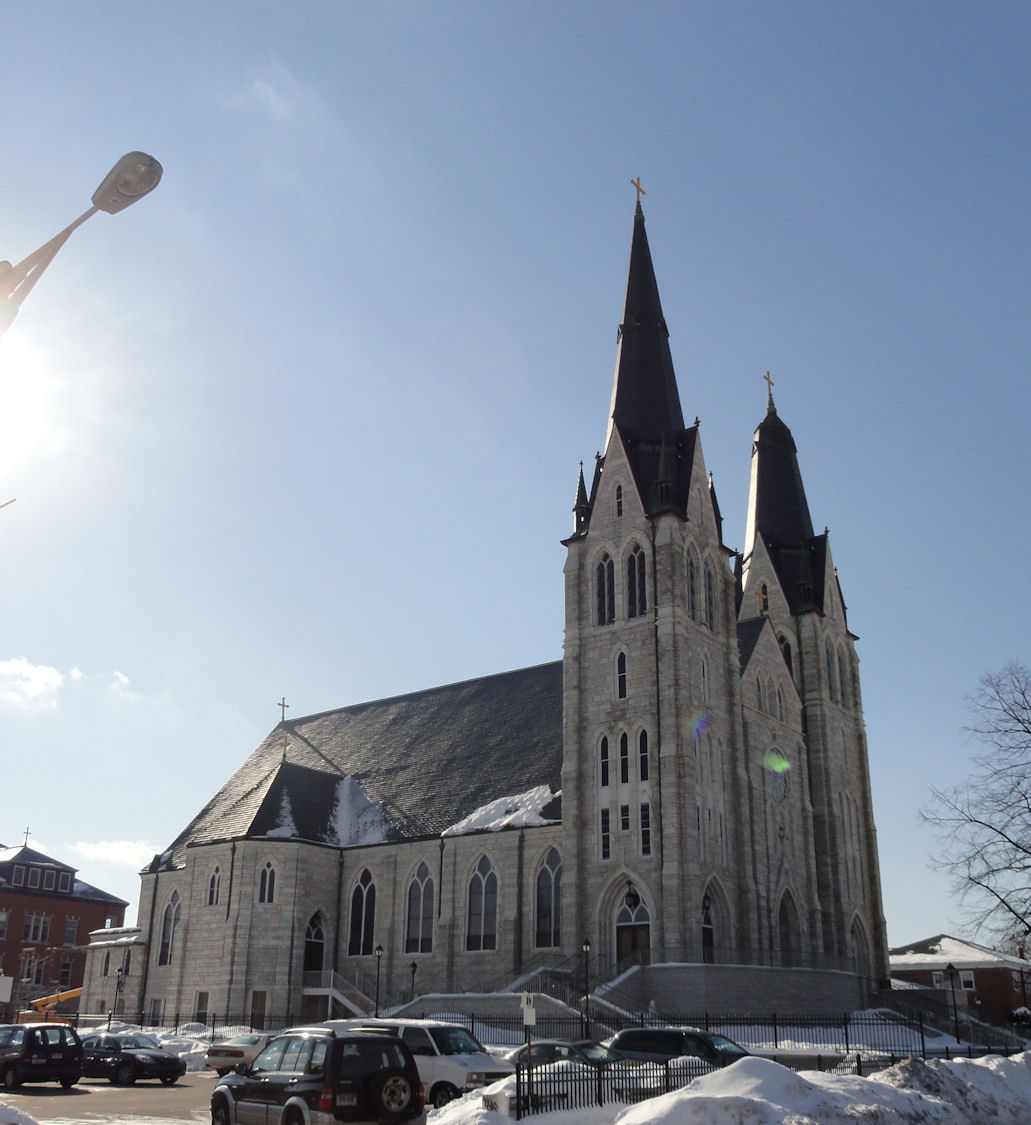
- Sacred Heart Parish
- Location: 158 Broad Street; New Britain, Connecticut
- Country: United States
- Denomination: Roman Catholic
- Website: https://sacredheartnb.org/

History
- Founded: August 10, 1894
- Founder: Polish immigrants
- Dedication: Sacred Heart
- Dedicated: October 4, 1896

Administration
- Division: Vicariate: Hartford
- Province: Hartford
- Archdiocese: Hartford

Clergy
- Archbishop: Most Rev. Leonard Paul Blair, D.D.
- Vicar: Rev. Tomasz Sztuber
- Priest: Rev. Stanislaw Dudek
- Pastor: Rev. Msgr Daniel J Plocharczyk

Sacred Heart Parish (Polish: Parafia Najświętszego Serca Pana Jezusa w New Britain) is a Catholic parish designated for Polish immigrants in New Britain, Connecticut.

Founded on August 10, 1894. It is one of the oldest Polish-American Roman Catholic parishes in New England in the Archdiocese of Hartford.

== History ==
On August 10, 1894, the New Britain Polish Catholic community became a mission of the Archdiocese's oldest Polish Catholic parish, St. Stanislaus Parish, Meriden. The mission phase ended on September 10, 1895, when Fr. Lucyan Bójnowski was appointed pastor in New Britain. Initially, the Polish-born priest's new parish was named St. Casimir the King, but this name was officially changed in 1896 to honor the Sacred Heart. The original Sacred Heart Church, located on Orange Street, was dedicated by Bishop Michael Tierney on October 4, 1896.

A new much larger church was designed by architect George P. B. Alderman of Holyoke, MA shortly after the construction of the first church.

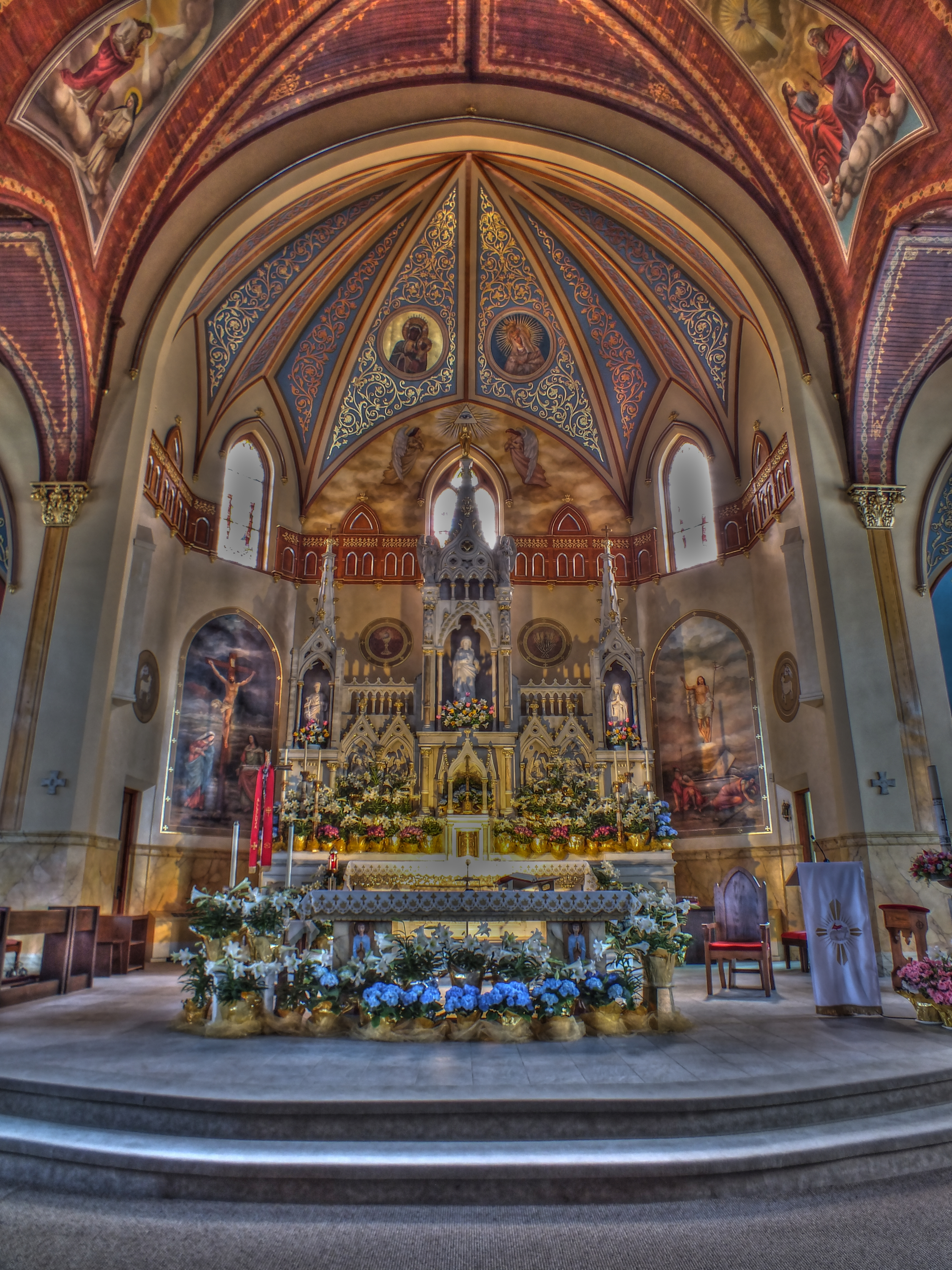
Sacred Heart Church - Main altar.jpg

== Bibliography ==
- Shea, Jonathan; Proko, Barbara (2005). The Polish Community of New Britain - Images of America. Arcadia Publishing. ISBN 0-7385-3765-9.
- Dolores Liptak, review of Daniel S. Buczek, People of God: A Centennial History of Sacred Heart of Jesus Parish, New Britain, Connecticut (1998), in Catholic Historical Review 85:2 (1999), pp. 324–325.
- The 150th Anniversary of Polish-American Pastoral Ministry. Webster, Massachusetts: St. Joseph Basilica. September 11, 2005.
- The Official Catholic Directory in USA
