= State Armory =

State Armory may refer to:

- State Armory (Craig, Colorado), listed on the National Register of Historic Places in Moffat County, Colorado
- State Armory (Springfield, Massachusetts), listed on the National Register of Historic Places in Hampden County, Massachusetts
