= 2011 Springfield tornado =

EF3 tornado in Massachusetts, U.S.

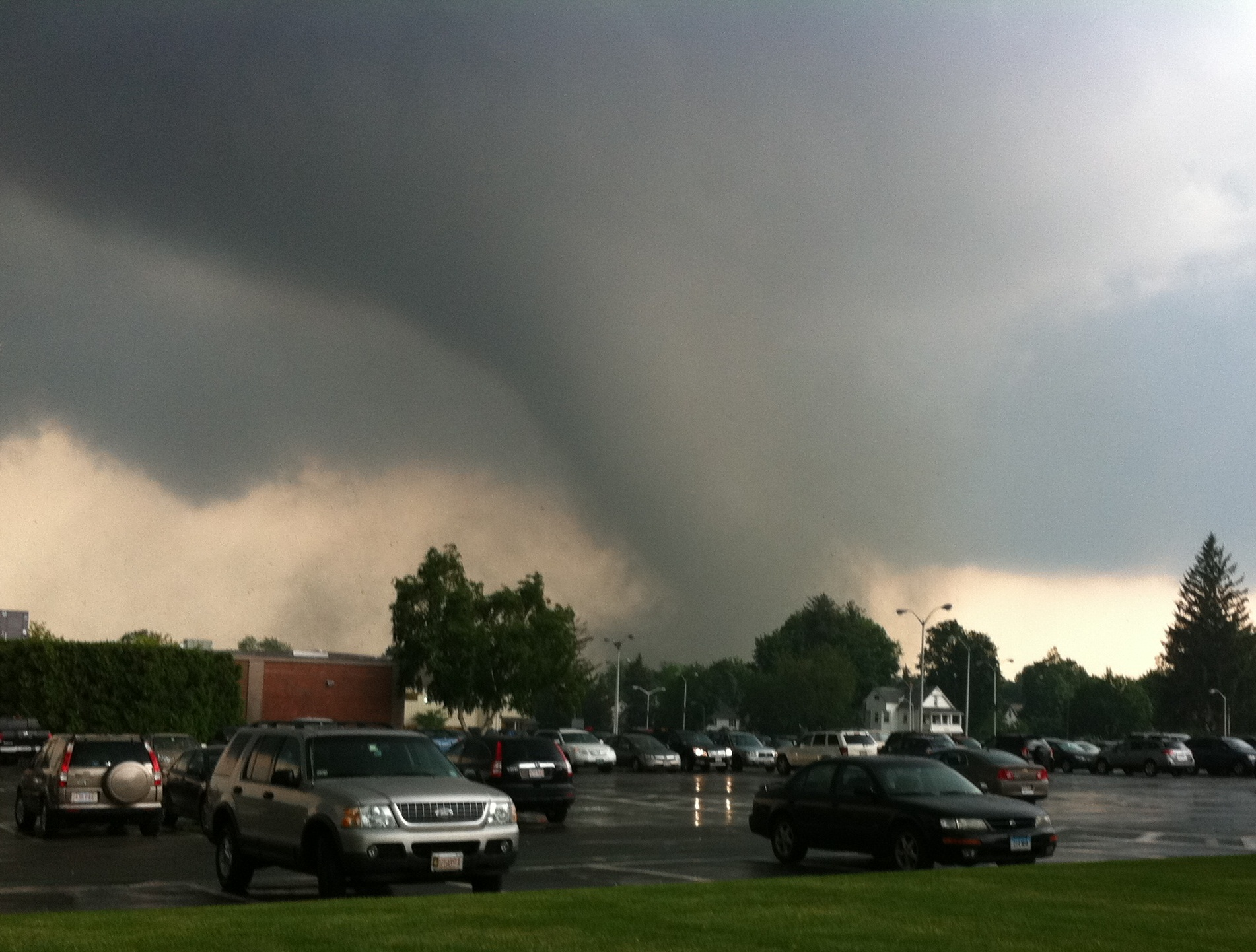
- The tornado as it entered the South End neighborhood of Springfield.

Meteorological history
- Formed: June 1, 2011, 4:17 p.m. EDT (UTC–04:00)
- Dissipated: June 1, 2011, 5:27 p.m. EDT (UTC–04:00)
- Duration: 1 hour, 10 minutes

EF3 tornado
- on the Enhanced Fujita scale
- Max width: 880 yards (0.50 mi; 0.80 km)
- Path length: 37.58 miles (60.48 km)
- Highest winds: 160 mph (260 km/h)

Overall effects
- Fatalities: 3 (+1 indirect)
- Injuries: 200
- Damage: $227.6 million (2011 USD)
- Areas affected: Hampden and Worcester Counties in Massachusetts
- Part of the Tornadoes of 2011

On the afternoon of June 1, 2011, an unusually long-tracked and powerful tornado caused significant damage in Hampden and Worcester Counties in Western and Central Massachusetts, including the city of Springfield, resulting in three fatalities (plus one indirect fatality), at least 200 injuries, and over 500 families being left homeless. The tornado, which was part of a severe weather event that occurred in portions of New England that day, received a final rating of EF3 on the Enhanced Fujita scale, with peak winds being estimated at 160 mph (260 km/h).

== Meteorological synopsis ==
On May 30, the Storm Prediction Center (SPC) noted the possibility of a severe weather event in the Northeastern United States in their outlook. A storm system was forecast to draw warm, moist air (with dew points over 60 °F (16 °C)) from the south, ahead of a driving cold front. In light of this, the SPC issued a slight risk for severe thunderstorms across the area. As an upper-level trough moved over the Great Lakes, further moisture and warmth increased atmospheric instability in the area, raising the threat of a squall line or supercell thunderstorms. By June 1, the storm system moved over Ontario and Quebec, with a cold front trailing behind it over northern New England. CAPE values exceeded 4,000 J/kg, indicating an extreme amount of instability in the atmosphere, conducive to strong thunderstorms. Additionally, a strong upper-level jet stream brought significant wind shear, which, in combination with the atmospheric instability, indicated a significant severe weather threat, with the main effects expected to result from downburst winds and large hail, but with tornadoes possible. An EML, which emerged over Arizona on May 28, was also present and created abnormally steep lapse rates in the mid-levels of the atmosphere, further increasing instability.

Reflectivity radar loop of the supercell thunderstorm that produced the Springfield tornado

Between 8:18 a.m. and 9:15 a.m. (EDT), severe storms producing 1 in (2.5 cm) hail developed over portions of New Hampshire, Massachusetts and Maine; however, little if any impact resulted from these storms. At 10:05 a.m., the SPC issued a severe thunderstorm watch for the entire state of Vermont, much of northern New York, northeastern Pennsylvania and parts of western Massachusetts and Connecticut. By this time, a broken line of severe storms had developed over parts of western New York and northern Pennsylvania. With the storms gradually developing throughout the day and an increasing threat of tornadoes, a tornado watch was issued at 1:00 p.m. for much of New England, southern New York, eastern Pennsylvania and most of New Jersey. Around 2:00 p.m., severe storms with damaging hail, measured up to 2.75 in (7.0 cm), and winds around 60 mph (97 km/h) developed in eastern New York. These storms gradually tracked east-southeastward into Vermont and later New Hampshire. One particular supercell produced very large 3.25-inch (8.3 cm) diameter hail at Shaftsbury, Vermont after producing a funnel cloud and baseball sized hail across the border in New York State. At 2:43 p.m., the first of several tornado warnings in the area was issued for southern Coos County, New Hampshire.

Between 3:00 and 3:30 p.m., severe storms developed over western Massachusetts and prompted a tornado warning to be issued at 3:28 p.m. for parts of Hampden, Hampshire and Franklin Counties. About an hour later, another warning was issued for Springfield, Massachusetts, and surrounding areas. Within minutes, a touchdown was confirmed near Springfield by local law enforcement and amateur radio operators.

== Tornado summary ==
=== Westfield ===
The tornado first touched down at 4:17 p.m. EDT (20:17 UTC) in the Munger Hill section of Westfield, near Birch Bluffs Drive. Within Westfield, a total of 257 homes suffered damage, mostly ranging from broken windows to roof damage. However, 3 homes suffered extensive damage, including a house on Shaker Road which was ultimately condemned due to a tree piercing through the roof. Damage to homes and other structures was reported on Birch Bluffs Drive, Shaker Road, Falley Drive, Steiger Drive, Mallard Lane, Cardinal Lane, Glenwood Drive, Pontoosic Road, and Knollwood Drive. The tornado moderately damaged Munger Hill Elementary School, with two classrooms nearly destroyed and debris scattered throughout the school. The tornado removed a 20-foot section of roofing from the school and moved it several hundred feet away, dumping it in a swimming pool at a nearby home on Cardinal Lane. Only a handful of people were inside the school when the tornado struck, as pupils had already been dismissed for the day. Significant damage to trees and power lines occurred throughout Westfield. No fatalities or serious injuries occurred in Westfield as a result of the tornado; initial reports by state officials erroneously stated that two deaths occurred in Westfield.

=== Agawam ===
The tornado briefly passed through the heavily forested northern section of Agawam, moving through Ridgeview Park and Robinson State Park. There were 25 acres (10 hectares) of damage at Robinson State Park, including damage to trees, roads, trails, day-use areas, and power lines. Multiple homes were damaged in Feeding Hills and North Agawam, although damage was relatively minor and no homes were destroyed. On River Street in North Agawam, power lines and telephone poles were torn down or twisted by the tornado. There were no tornado-related injuries or fatalities in Agawam, although an 18-year-old high school student was struck by lightning during the storm.

=== West Springfield ===
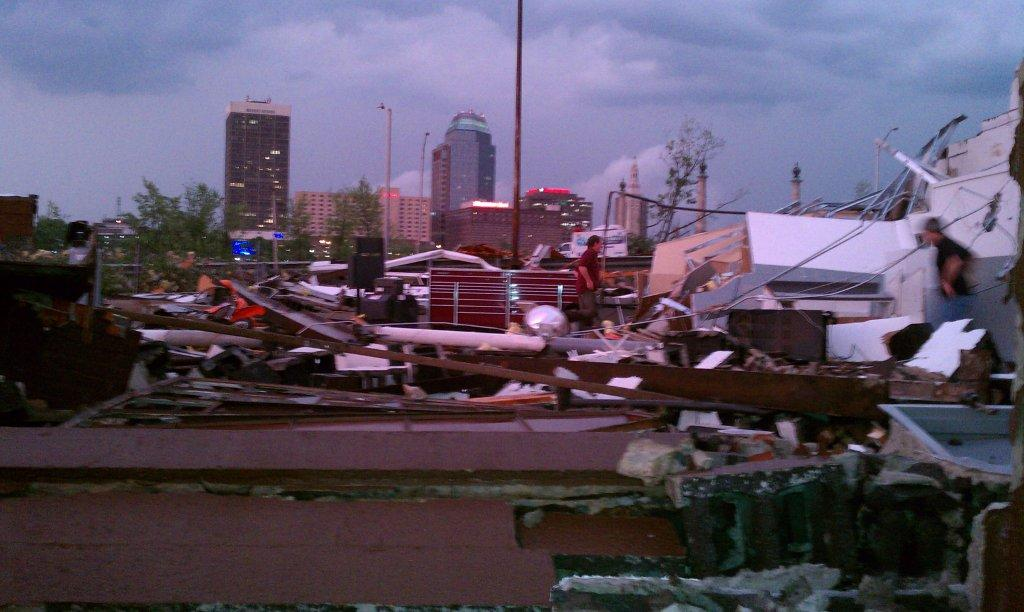
Debris from buildings in West Springfield

The tornado rapidly intensified as it moved into the city of West Springfield, causing extensive damage to industrial buildings and tearing off roofs and the upper floors of three-story apartment complexes. Additionally, a few homes collapsed due to the severity of structural damage. Throughout West Springfield, 88 buildings were destroyed and two people were killed. One woman, 39-year-old Angelica Guererro, was killed on Union Street when her triple decker home collapsed on top of her. She was protecting her 15-year-old daughter by climbing on top of her and shielding her from debris while they both took cover in a bathtub. Her daughter survived with serious injuries, along with her 46-year-old husband, who was critically injured by their home collapsing. Another fatality took place on Main Street when a 5 foot (1.5 m) wide oak tree fell on a vehicle, killing the driver, 23-year old Sergey Livchin. The tornado then moved east, crossing the Connecticut River and entering Springfield.

=== Springfield ===
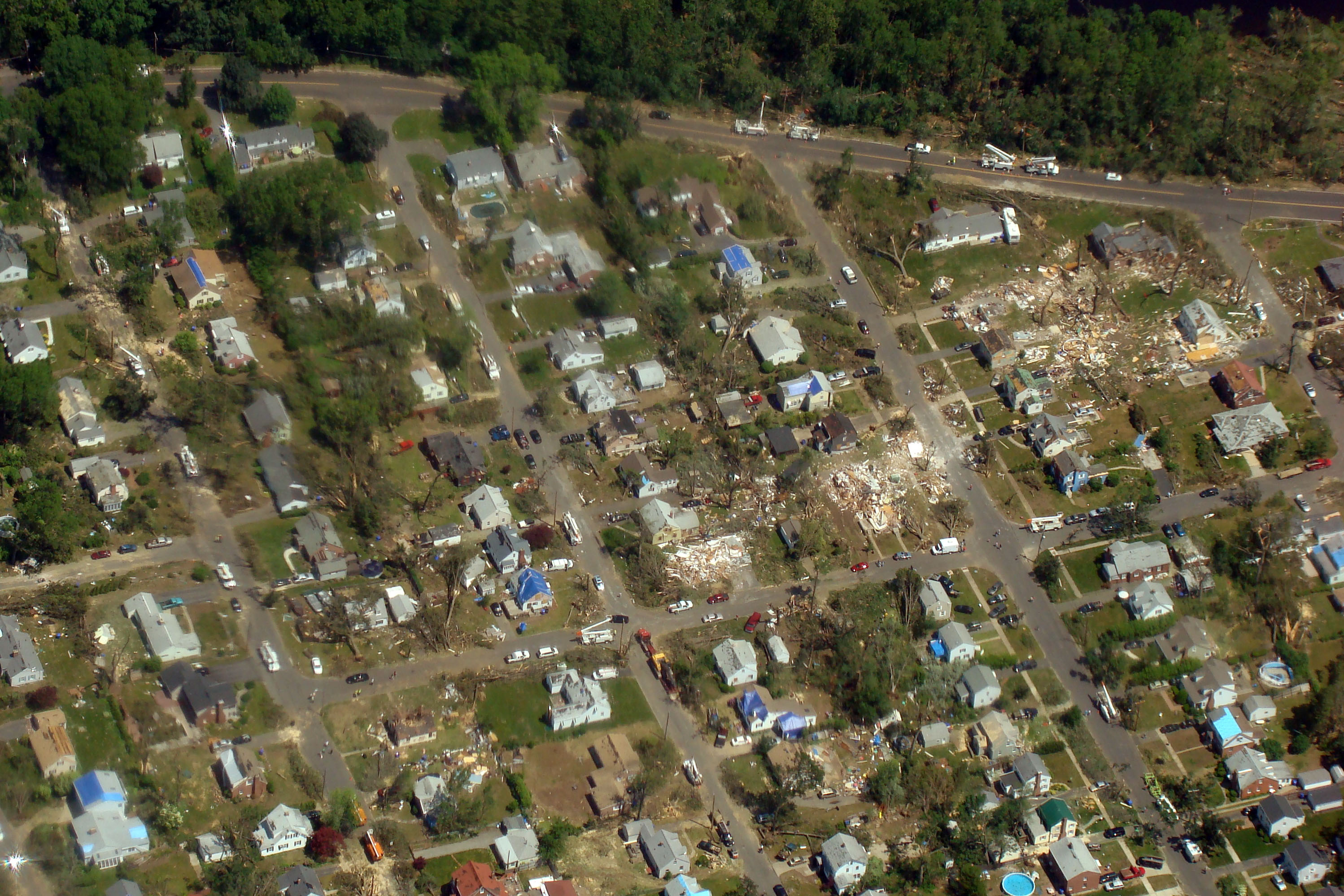
Homes suffering varying degrees of damage

Upon entering Springfield, the tornado crossed over the Memorial Bridge, with a significant amount of vehicular traffic on the bridge. The tornado tipped a tractor-trailer onto its side, blocking the two eastbound lanes. There were no injuries or fatalities on the bridge, and none of the other vehicles were overturned. Video of the tornado crossing the river was broadcast live on multiple news stations, as cameras on top of the nearby Monarch Place skyscraper recorded the tornado as it crossed the river and entered the city from West Springfield. Footage of the tornado crossing the bridge was widely circulated in the days following the storm. The tornado caused extensive damage throughout Springfield, destroying over 500 buildings. According to the Springfield Fire Department, several injuries were caused by cars being overturned by the tornado in multiple different occurrences throughout Springfield.

==== Metro Center ====
After crossing the Connecticut River and the Memorial Bridge, the tornado moved into Metro Center, the most urban neighborhood in Springfield. The tornado caused extensive damage to Springfield's Connecticut River Walk Park, destroying much of the park's formerly lush tree canopy and large sections of its wrought-iron fences. Some 200-year-old heritage trees in Court Square were uprooted and scattered throughout the area. Damage to buildings in Metro Center was relatively minor, especially compared to the neighboring South End. A Hampden County assistant district attorney was seriously injured when she was struck by flying debris while she walked from the Hampden District Attorney office to her car. Multiple people narrowly avoided injury as the tornado sent broken glass flying from windows at the Hampden District Attorney office.

==== South End ====
Several commercial brick buildings in Springfield's South End sustained extensive damage – large portions of their roofs were torn off and numerous ornate brick facades were completely destroyed. At the intersection of Main Street and Union Street, the mixed use Mills-Hale-Owen blocks were extensively damaged, with the top floor of one of the buildings partially collapsing. The multistory buildings were demolished one day after the tornado struck. A daycare on Main Street was directly in the tornado's path; none of the children were injured but one employee suffered minor injuries. The South End Community Center (located in the Howard Street Armory) sustained extensive damage; a large section of the roof was torn off by the tornado. Thirty-five children were taking shelter inside the community center when the tornado struck, although there were no injuries among the children. Severe structural damage to apartments and townhouses took place near Mulberry Street. Union Car Wash on Union Street was directly hit by the tornado; windows were broken and three garage bay doors were removed by the tornado. Dozens of cars in the parking lot were badly damaged by flying debris. In Auburn, roughly 39 mi (63 km) from Springfield, an advertising sign from the car wash was found.

==== Six Corners ====
Moving out of the South End, the tornado continued east into Six Corners, a residential urban neighborhood. Numerous houses and other structures in six corners suffered extensive damage as a result of the tornado. The Elias Brookings School, an elementary school in Six Corners, was severely damaged as a result of the tornado. The school was not demolished as a result of the damage; it sat derelict and vacant until a private developer eventually purchased it from the city in June 2018, with the intention of renovating the building and converting it into affordable housing, which was completed in 2022.

==== Springfield College ====
After moving through Six Corners, the tornado passed through Springfield College, moving through the southern section of the campus. Numerous 150-year old maple and oak trees were uprooted or snapped in half by the tornado. International Hall, a 9-story dormitory housing approximately 300 students, was struck directly by the tornado. The metal façade was severely damaged, with large pieces torn off of the building. Almost all of the windows on the tower were blown out by flying debris or the tornado's powerful winds. Three of the university's ten residence halls suffered severe roof damage (International Hall, Massasoit Hall & Reed Hall), necessitating extensive repairs over the summer, in time for the start of the fall 2011 semester. There were no injuries or fatalities at Springfield College.

==== East Forest Park ====
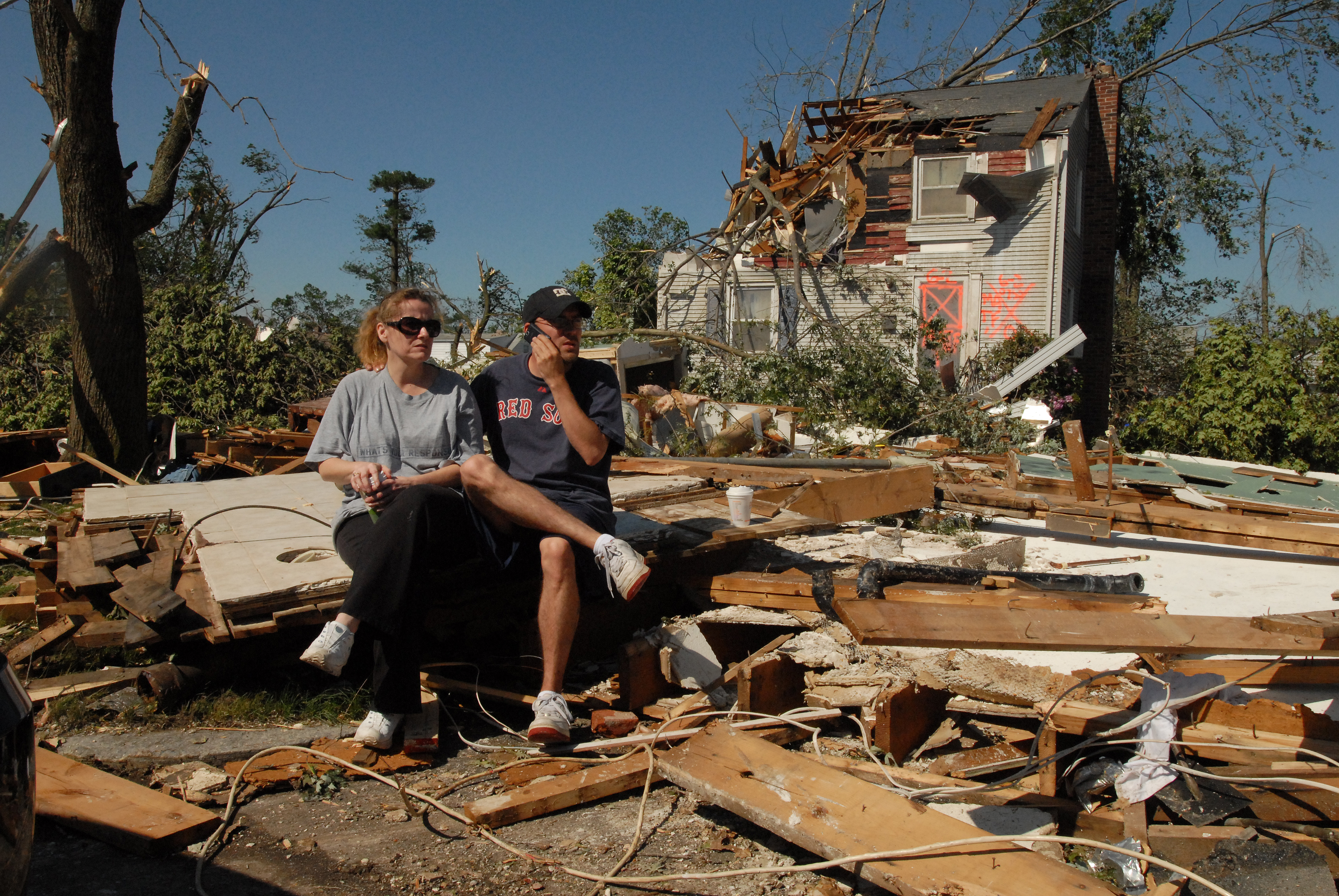
A man and woman sitting among debris in the Forest Park neighborhood of Springfield

The East Forest Park neighborhood was hit especially hard by the tornado. Homes were destroyed (some were lifted off their foundations), cars were overturned, and access to and from the neighborhood was blocked for days due to downed trees and power lines. Cathedral High School was directly in the tornado's path; it sustained extensive structural damage and was demolished in 2014. There were no injuries at the school; students were dismissed early due to the threat of severe weather. The few students and teachers still inside when the tornado struck escaped injury by taking shelter under desks, in closets, and behind bleachers. Debris from Cathedral High School was found roughly 43 miles (69 km) east, in Millbury. Pennsylvania Avenue was hit especially hard by the tornado, with multiple homes being destroyed when the tornado passed through. Cathedral High School was not rebuilt, and it was merged in 2015 with Holyoke Catholic High School into the new Pope Francis High School.

==== Sixteen Acres ====
Springfield's Sixteen Acres, a suburban neighborhood, was severely damaged by the tornado. Large trees were uprooted throughout the neighborhood, with multiple falling onto and damaging homes. Veterans Memorial Golf Course, an 18-hole golf course in the heart of Sixteen Acres, suffered extensive tree damage and moderate turf damage when the tornado passed through the north side of the golf course, moving along Plumtree Road. The Pioneer Valley Montessori School was damaged by the tornado as it passed through Sixteen Acres. Damage to buildings occurred on Bradley Road, Plumtree Road, Old Farm Road, Evergreen Road, Greenlawn Street, Glenvale Street, Talbot Road, South Branch Parkway, Parker Street, Cooley Street, Acrebrook Road, Westbrook Drive, Rochford Circle, Woodcrest Road, Druid Hill Road, White Oak Road, Woodland Road, Ranch Lane, Brianna Lane, Tinkham Road, Penncastle Street, Pennfield Street, Rachel Street, Albee Street, Angelica Drive, Calley Street, Flora Street, Garnet Street, and Tanglewood Drive.

=== Wilbraham ===
Continuing eastward, the tornado tracked through Wilbraham, causing extensive deforestation and significant structural damage. The tornado moved along Tinkham Road and Monson Road, crossing Main Street south of the town center. On Tinkham Road, the tornado passed through the historic Adams Cemetery, damaging headstones, trees, and fencing. Damage to homes and other structures occurred on West Colonial Road, Eastwood Drive, Wendy Road, South Colonial Road, Brookside Drive, Brookside Circle, Stony Hill Road, Evangeline Drive, Tinkham Road, Main Street, Church Lane, Wildwood Lane, Echo Hill Road, Bolles Road, Hollow Road, Glendale Road, Ames Road, and Monson Road. At the Wilbraham Children's Museum on Main Street, fencing and a playground were damaged by fallen trees and flying debris. The museum building itself suffered roof and siding damage, in addition to broken windows. The tornado then passed through Rice Nature Preserve and the Sunrise Peak Conservation Area, as it began to climb Mount Ella, heading east towards Monson. A total of 237 buildings in Wilbraham received damage from the tornado, 13 of which were destroyed. All injuries in Wilbraham were non-life-threatening and relatively minor.

=== Monson ===
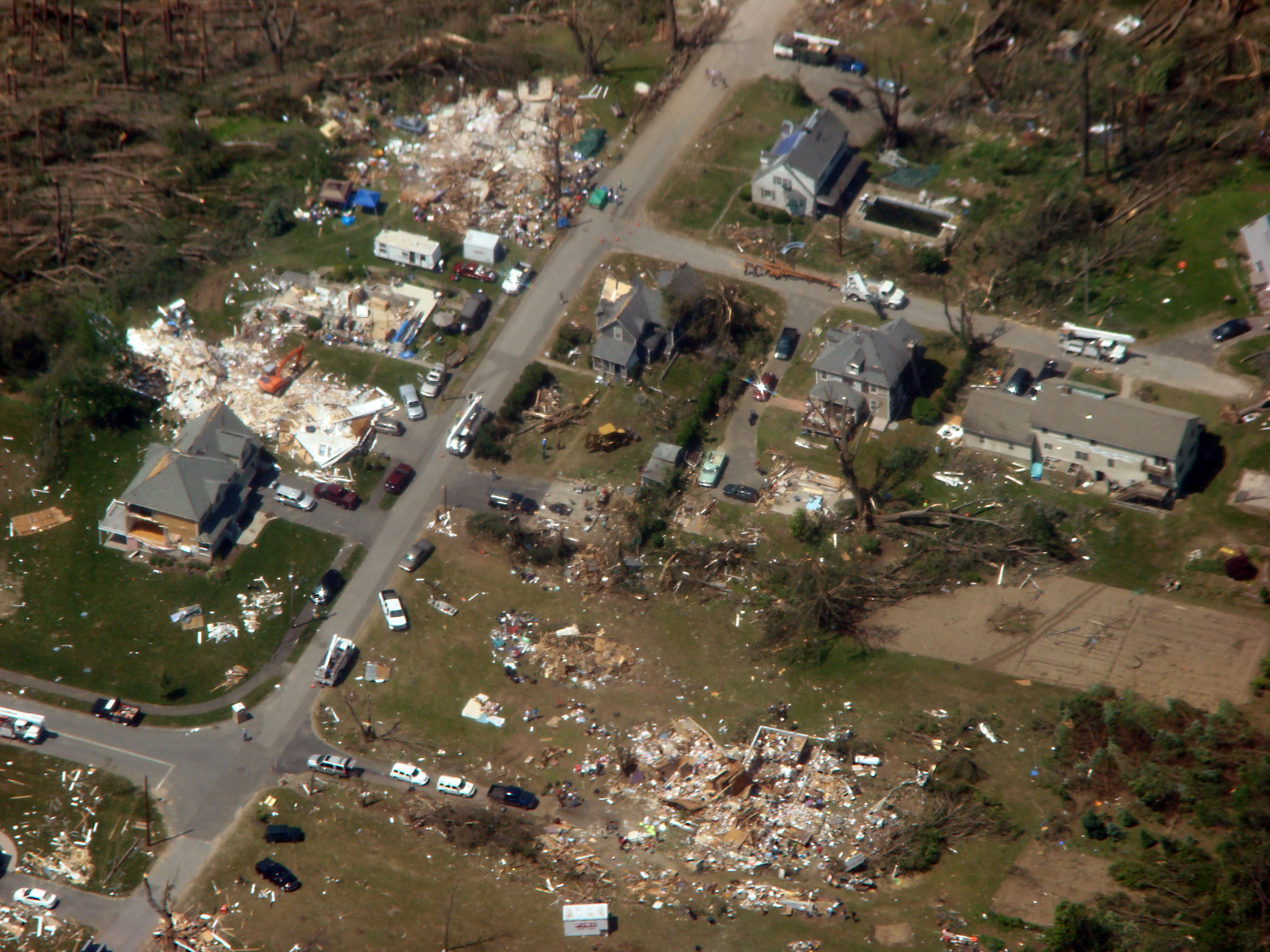
Damaged and destroyed homes on Stewart Avenue in Monson

The storm then moved through the center of Monson, crossing over Main Street (Route 32) and damaging nearly every structure in the area. Many homes were badly damaged, some of which were completely flattened. A total of 77 buildings were destroyed, some completely. Some unanchored homes in town slid from their foundations and collapsed. The roof of the old Monson High School, which was then the town's police building, was completely destroyed, leading to the building's eventual demolition. In Natick, roughly 60 miles (97 km) from Monson, a picture from the town was found. A house on Stewart Avenue was flipped upside-down by the tornado, landing on its roof. A woman who was sheltering in a bathroom inside the house was injured when the tornado pulled her out of the window. The tornado damaged the First Church of Monson, knocking over its distinctive steeple. Another church, the Unitarian Universalist Parish of Monson, similarly lost its steeple in the tornado. A 75-year-old woman from Monson, Joan Bacon, was indirectly killed by the tornado; she died in the hospital the next morning after the tornado severely damaged her home while she was sheltering in the basement.

=== Brimfield ===
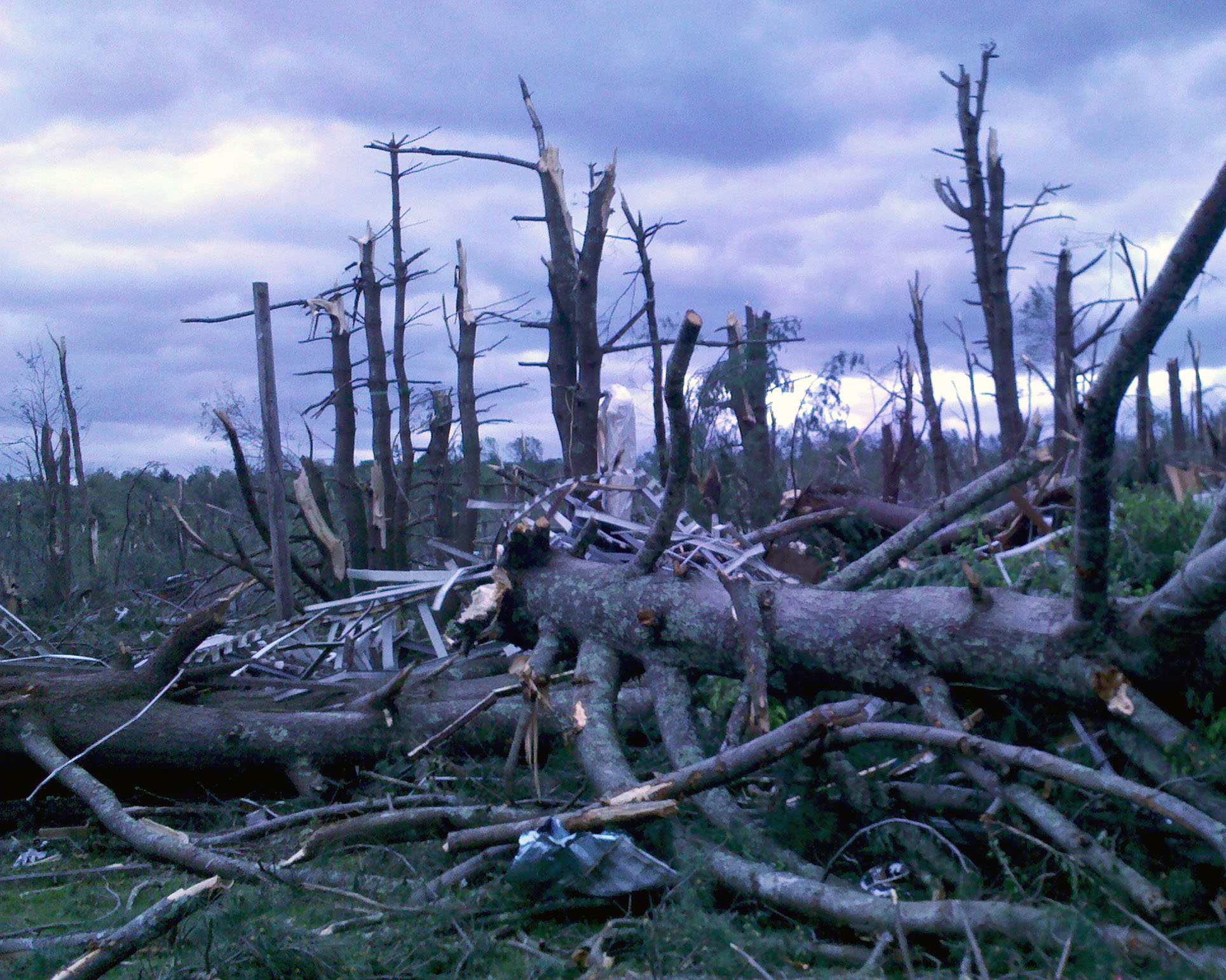
Tree damage in Brimfield

Shortly before 5:00 p.m., the tornado moved through Brimfield State Forest where it reached its maximum width of 0.5 miles (0.80 km). Thousands of trees were snapped and uprooted in this area. In Brimfield, a total of 192 buildings were damaged and 39 homes were destroyed by the tornado, including several that were completely swept from their foundations. Damage to buildings occurred on Sutcliffe Road, Dean Pond Road, Dearth Hill Road, Hollow Road, Haynes Hill Road, Wales Road (Route 19), Paige Hill Road, Holland Road, Sturbridge Road (U.S. Route 20), and East Brimfield-Holland Road. On Paige Hill Road, one horse was killed and three horses were injured by flying debris. The Village Green campground in East Brimfield was devastated by the tornado, with 95 out of 96 trailers destroyed. One woman, 52-year-old Virginia Darlow, was crushed to death by a refrigerator that fell on top of her when her RV was overturned by the tornado. Her boyfriend was critically injured; they both declined to vacate when the owners of the campground warned them of the approaching tornado and encouraged them to seek shelter. 22 other campers and campground residents took shelter with the owners of the campground in the basement of a house on the property, narrowly avoiding further injury or loss of life at the campground. Losses at the Village Green campground exceeded $1 million. Moving southeast, the tornado devastated the Quinebaug Cove campground in Brimfield, damaging or destroying an estimated 80 percent of the campground. There were no injuries or fatalities at the Quinebaug Cove campground. A bank statement which was displaced by the tornado was found in a Boston 25 News parking lot in Dedham, roughly 53 miles (85 km) away from Brimfield.

=== Sturbridge ===
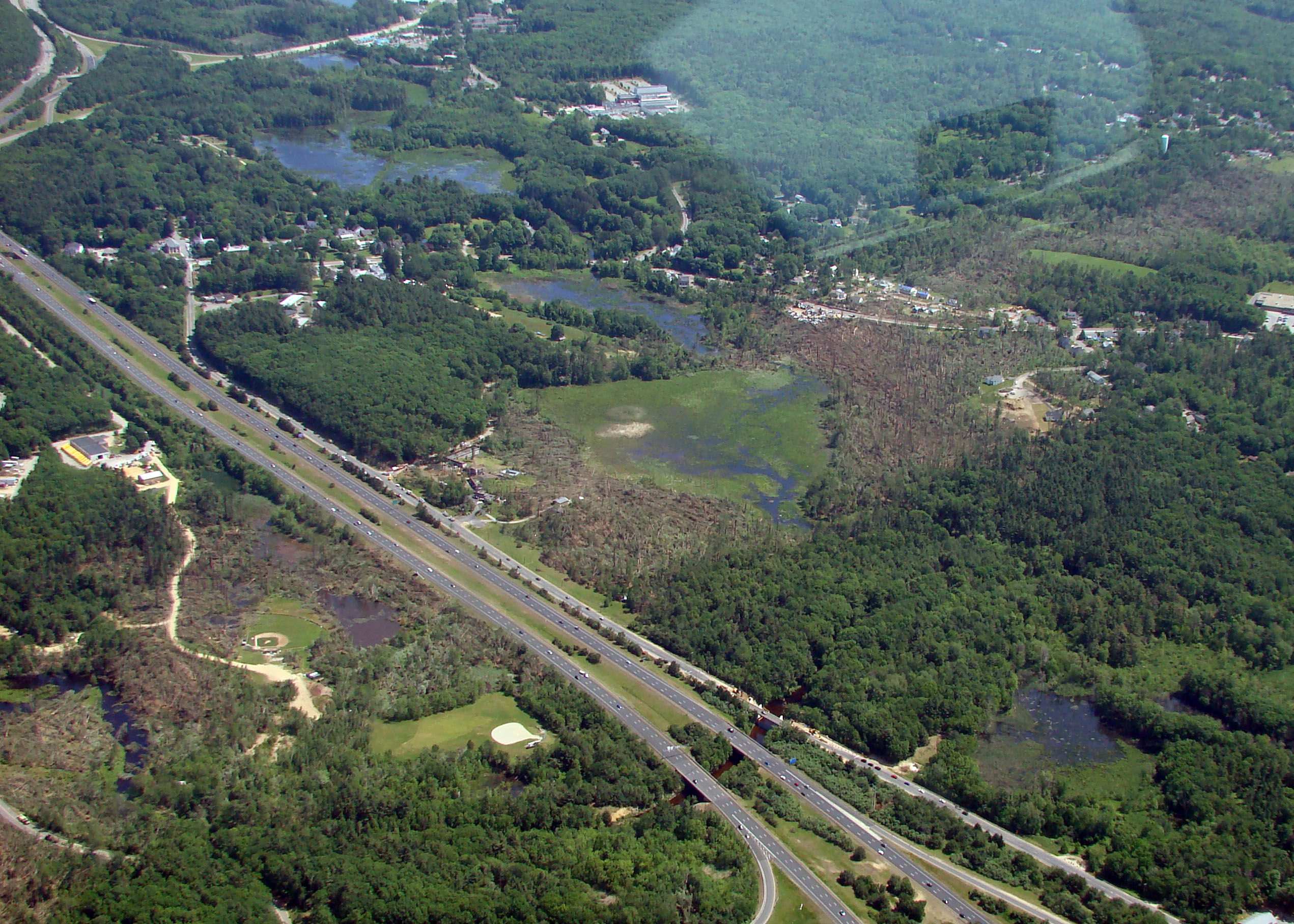
Aerial view of the tornado's path in Sturbridge, in the area of Interstate 84

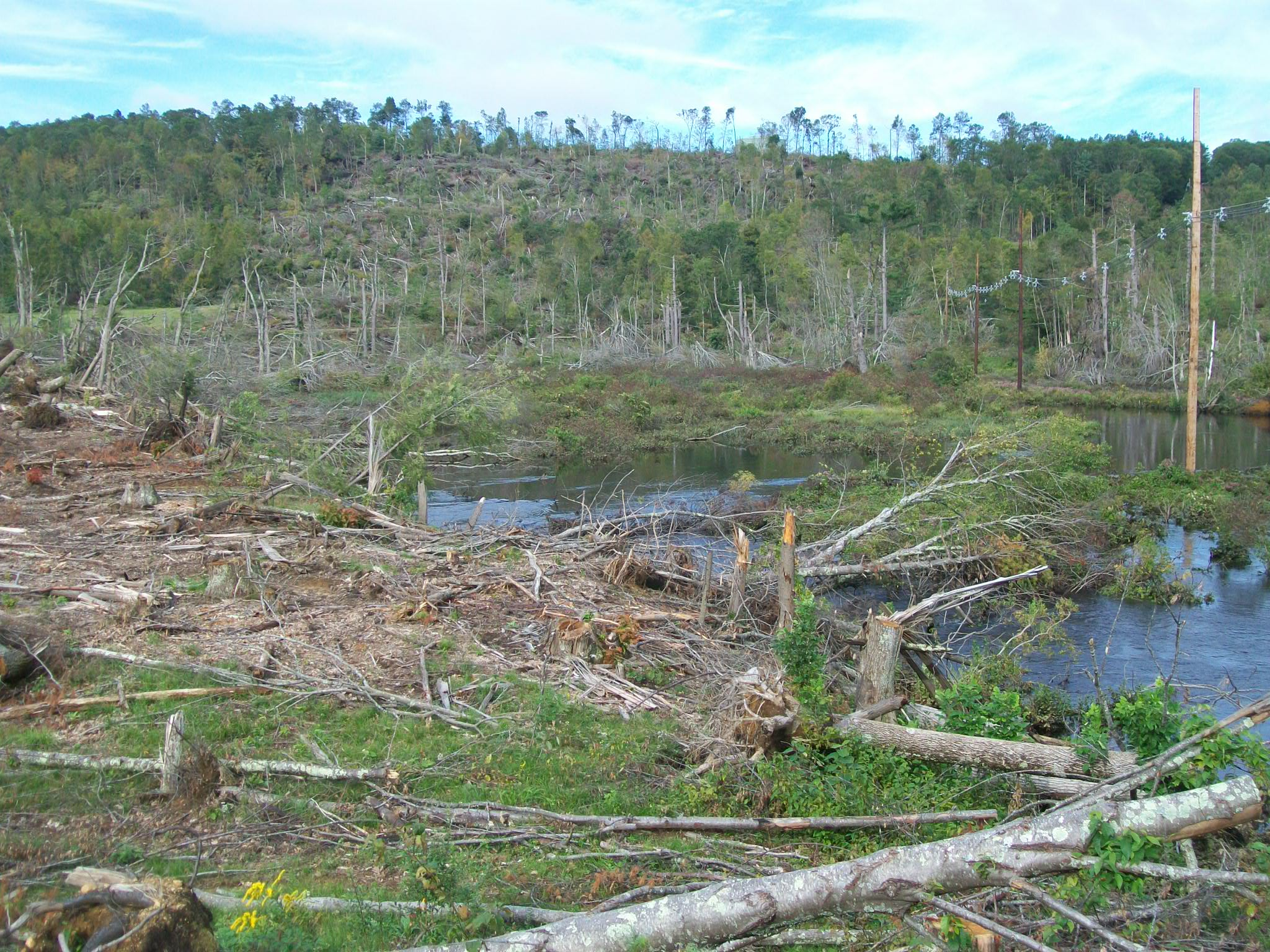
Tree damage in Sturbridge

The tornado crossed into Worcester County, passing over East Brimfield Lake in the process. The tornado moved to the south of Fiskdale and struck the town of Sturbridge, where thousands of trees were downed and multiple homes were damaged. The tornado passed through Old Sturbridge Village, a living history museum consisting of 240 acres (97 hectares) of land and 59 antique buildings. Damage at Old Sturbridge Village was mostly limited to trees and power lines in the forested southern section of the museum grounds, furthest from the buildings and exhibits. The tornado did not cause significant damage to any of the antique buildings. The tornado then crossed Interstate 84 south of exit 6A (old exit 3A), knocking over a gantry sign onto the southbound carriageway. At 5:22 p.m EDT (21:22 UTC), nearly 10 minutes after the tornado passed through Sturbridge, the Massachusetts State Police reported that multiple cars had overturned on Interstate 84 as a result of the tornado. A 34-room Days Inn hotel on Haynes Street suffered a near-direct hit from the tornado. Multiple trees fell onto and damaged the hotel, and all four buildings were damaged beyond repair. On Main Street (Route 131), Sturbridge Auto Body was struck directly by the tornado, collapsing the cinder block structure and destroying 106 cars. There were no injuries at Sturbridge Auto Body; employees took shelter after receiving advance warning of the approaching tornado. Damage to buildings occurred on Streeter Road, Holland Road, Stallion Hill Road, Old Sturbridge Village Road, Haynes Street, Farquhar Road, Main Street, Willard Road, and Fiske Hill Road.

=== Southbridge ===
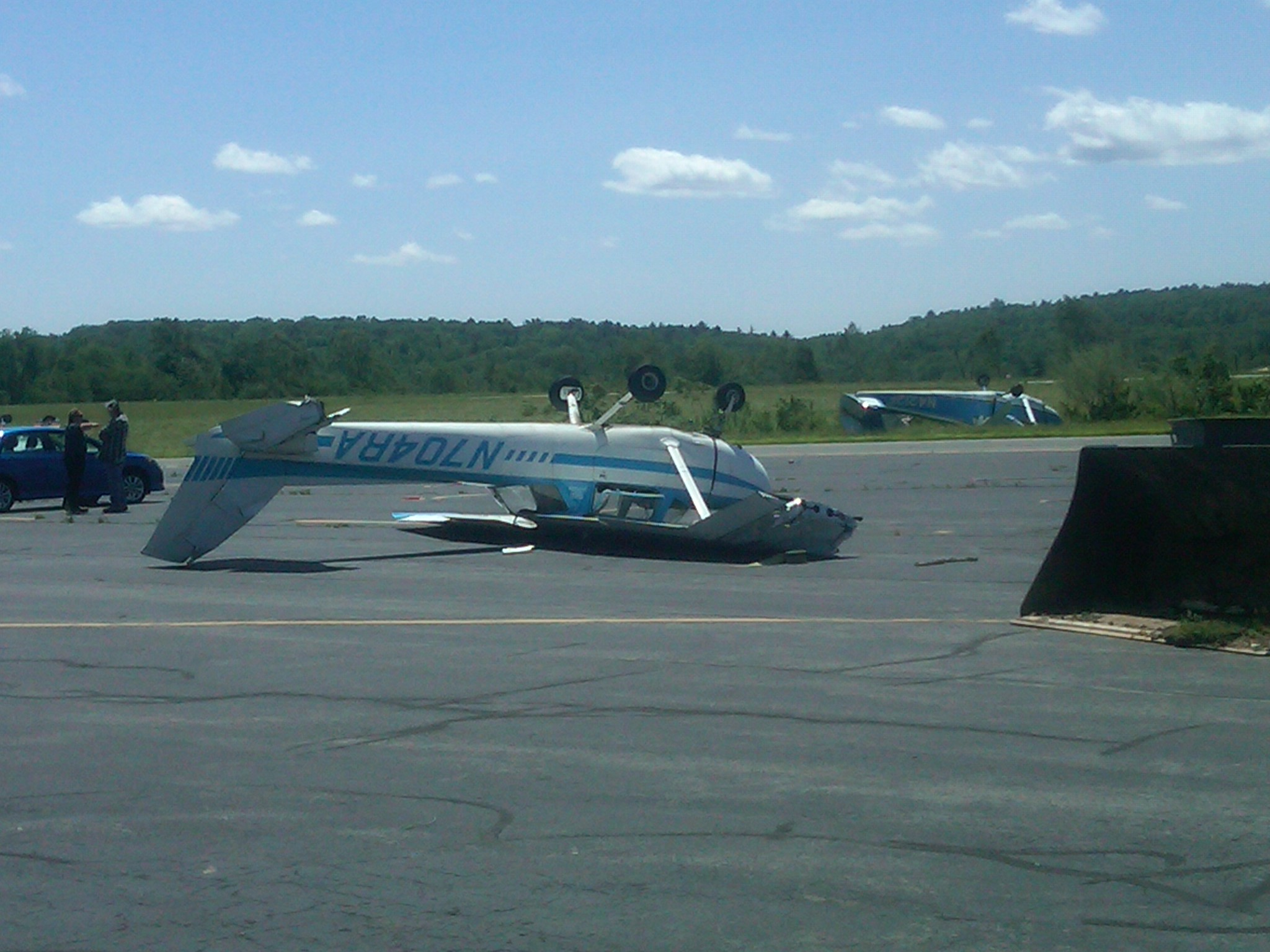
Damaged aircraft at Southbridge Airport

The tornado tracked through the northern section of Southbridge, avoiding the densely populated town center. Upon entering Southbridge, the tornado crossed through the McKinstry Brook wildlife management area, deforesting approximately 50 acres (20.2 hectares) of land. After exiting the wildlife management area, the tornado damaged several homes and uprooted trees on Pleasant Street. The tornado then moved through the southern section of Southbridge Municipal Airport, damaging or destroying 15 of the 17 airplanes at the airport. The tornado flipped or picked up the airplanes, sending several into the nearby woods. The airport's maintenance and office buildings were damaged, fencing at the airport was destroyed, and a hangar was destroyed. Moving east, the tornado ripped through the Rosemeade Apartments on Worcester Street (Route 169), destroying or severely damaging 68 apartments across six buildings. There were no injuries at the Rosemeade Apartments. The tornado then caused severe damage to homes, trees, fences, and power lines on Worcester Street, Brookside Road, and Charlton Street. A total of 78 buildings in Southbridge were damaged by the tornado.

=== Charlton ===
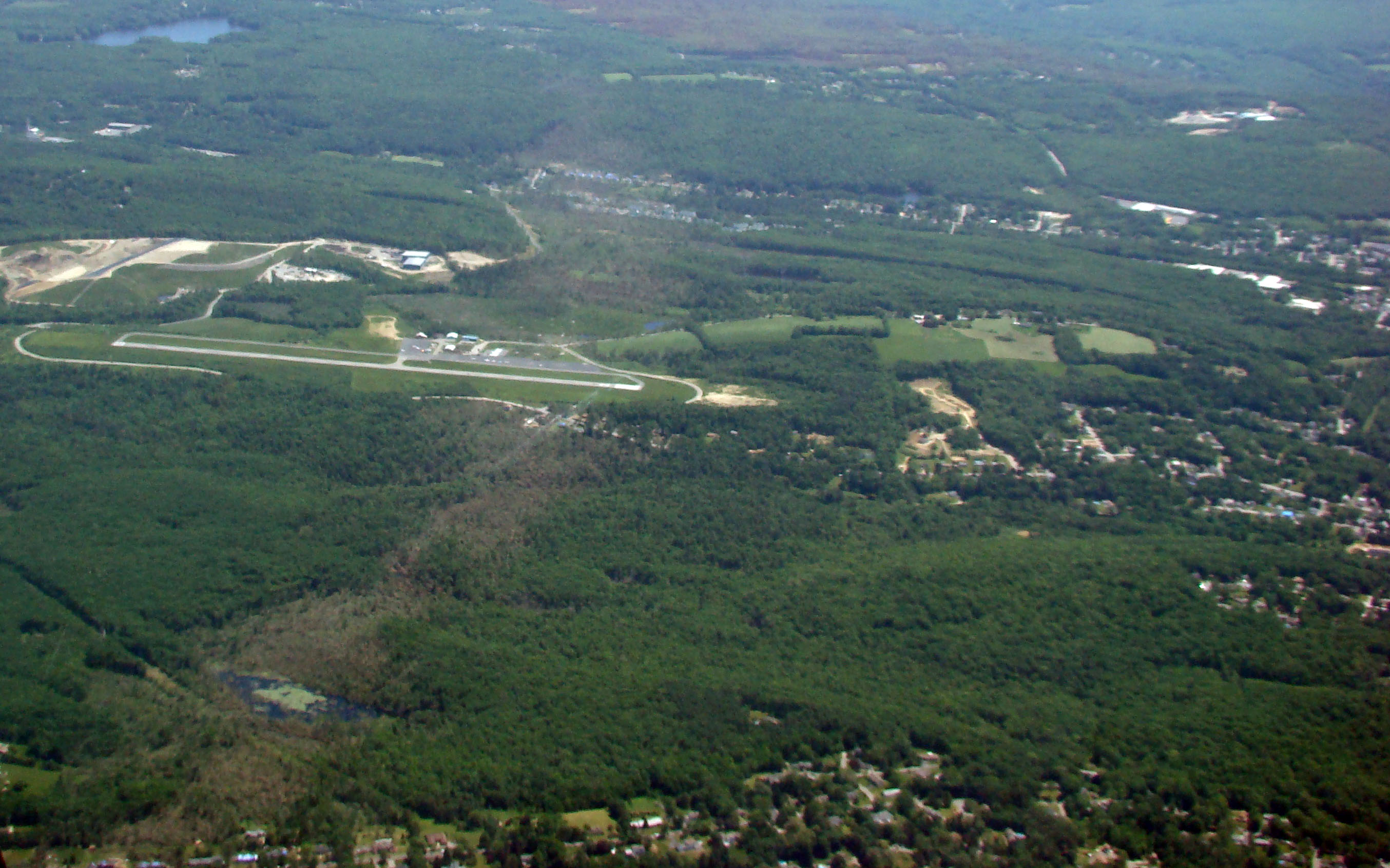
Damage path from the tornado in Southbridge and Charlton

The tornado moved into southwest Charlton, damaging homes on Harrington Road as the tornado crossed the Southbridge-Charlton border. The tornado then deforested a large hill to the south of Prindle Lake, moving eastward into the Denfield Road neighborhood. The tornado began to weaken as it crossed through a pasture while approaching the residential neighborhood. A homeowner on Denfield Road witnessed the swirling tornadic debris as it approached, noting the lack of a distinctive funnel cloud. On Denfield Road, the tornado damaged trees, telephone poles, personal property, sheds, and nearly a dozen homes as residents sheltered in basements. Damage to homes was mostly limited to roofs, siding, and broken windows. None of the affected structures in Charlton were destroyed, although several homes suffered significant roof damage. The tornado then left the Denfield Road neighborhood, knocking down trees and power lines as it crossed Guelphwood Road, moving to the east. The tornado ultimately dissipated in a forested area between Guelphwood Road and Blood Road in Charlton, at 5:27 p.m EDT (21:27 UTC). There were no injuries or fatalities in Charlton.

== Aftermath ==
=== Immediate aftermath ===
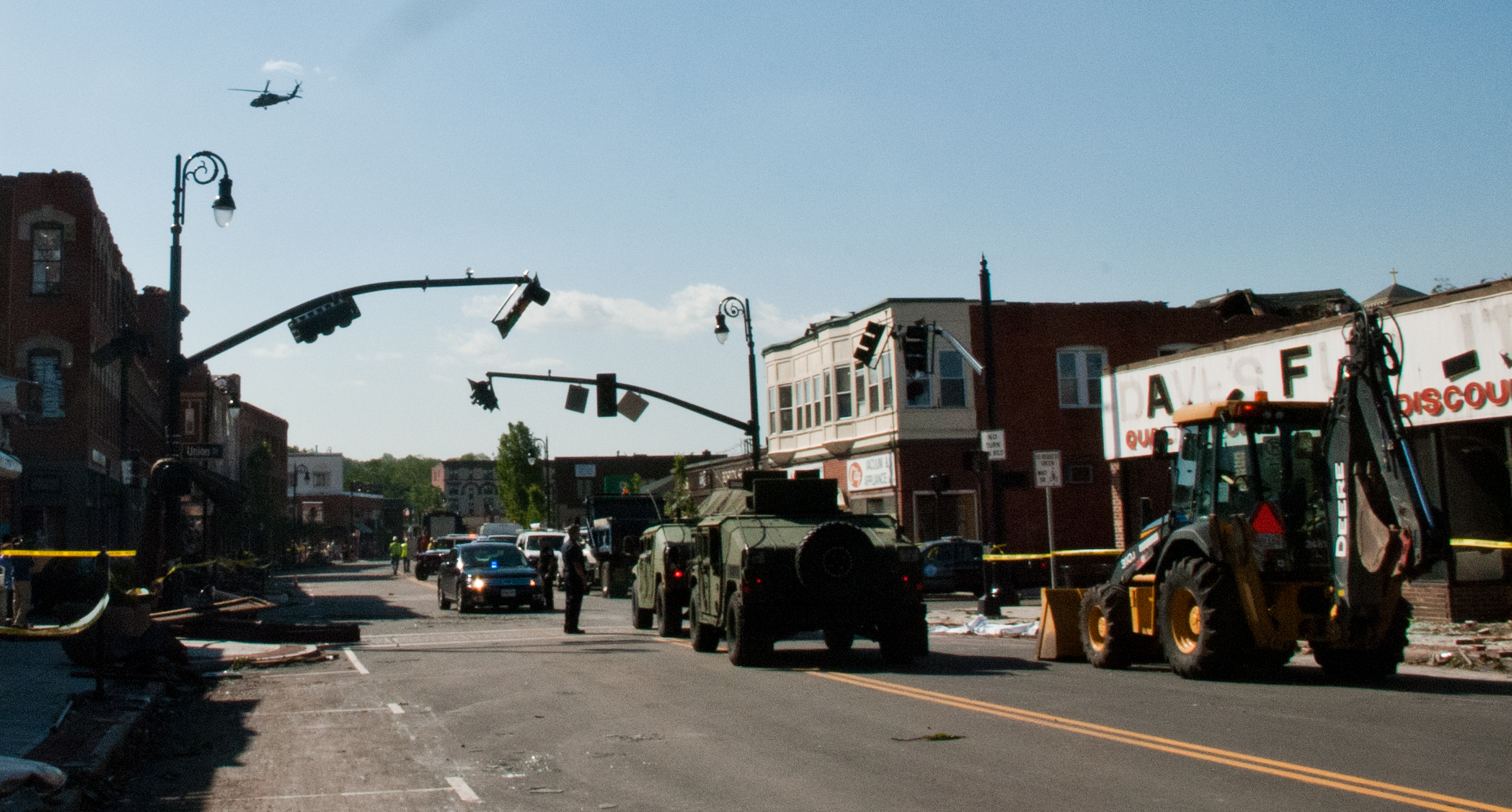
National Guard troops and Massachusetts State Police secure Main Street in Springfield, Massachusetts, on June 2, 2011.

Immediately following the storms, four people were reported dead. That number was later reduced to three as one Springfield man was found to have died of an unrelated heart attack prior to the tornado's impact. Hundreds of people were admitted to hospitals with injuries ranging from lightning strikes to trauma, and almost 500 people were forced to leave their homes, most of whom stayed in the MassMutual Center. Over two weeks later, more than 200 people were still homeless at the MassMutual Center in Springfield. In addition to the MassMutual Center, Tantasqua High School in Sturbridge and Brookfield Elementary School were opened up as emergency shelters. A Special Emergency Response Team was activated by the state police in order to search for missing people and those trapped underneath debris.

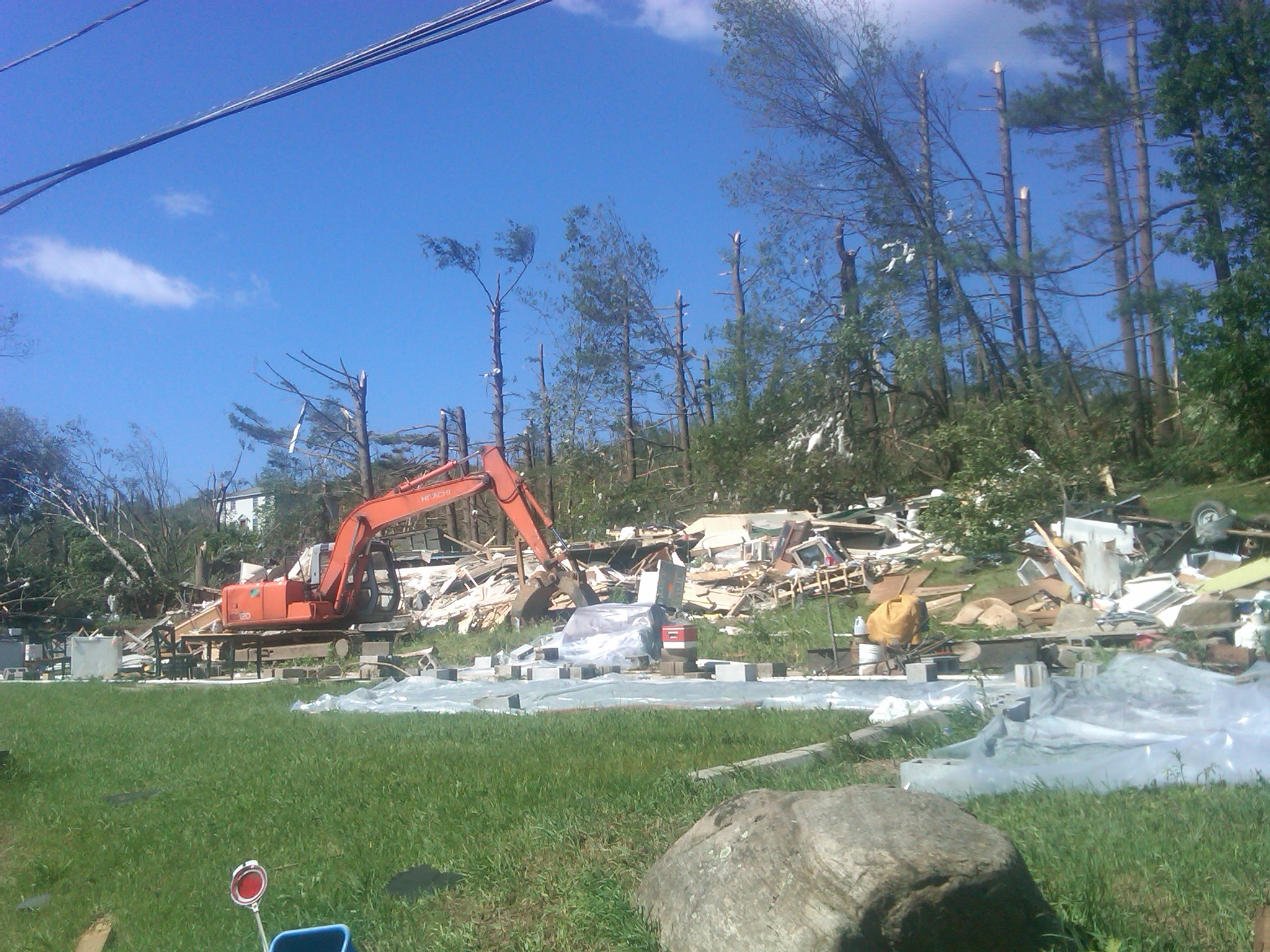
Tornado cleanup on Hollow Road in Brimfield on June 3

In Springfield, firefighters from Boston, Worcester, Newton, Waltham, Watertown, and Weston assisted in rescue efforts. Governor Deval Patrick also declared a state of emergency in Massachusetts, and activated 1,000 National Guard troops for rescue and recovery efforts. By June 2, six Red Cross shelters had been opened in the state and housed about 480 people. On June 2, 2011, the Business Improvement District of Hartford, Connecticut – Springfield's bi-state twin city – and the Downtown Boston Business Improvement District were helping the Springfield Business Improvement District with clean-up. Within two days of the tornadoes, the process of demolishing "structures beyond repair" began as local officials inspected hundreds of damaged homes. By June 7, three shelters remained open, housing 362 people. AmeriCorps NCCC (National Civilian Community Corps) deployed their nearby team, Summit 7 of Class 17, to aid the community in debris removal. Armed with chainsaws and other tools, the team spent several weeks helping residents clean up their homes and properties.

Graduations at Monson High School in Monson and Cathedral High School in Springfield were scheduled for Thursday, June 2, and Friday, June 3, respectively. Both graduation ceremonies were rescheduled due to the tornado's impact on both communities and the severe damage at Cathedral High School.

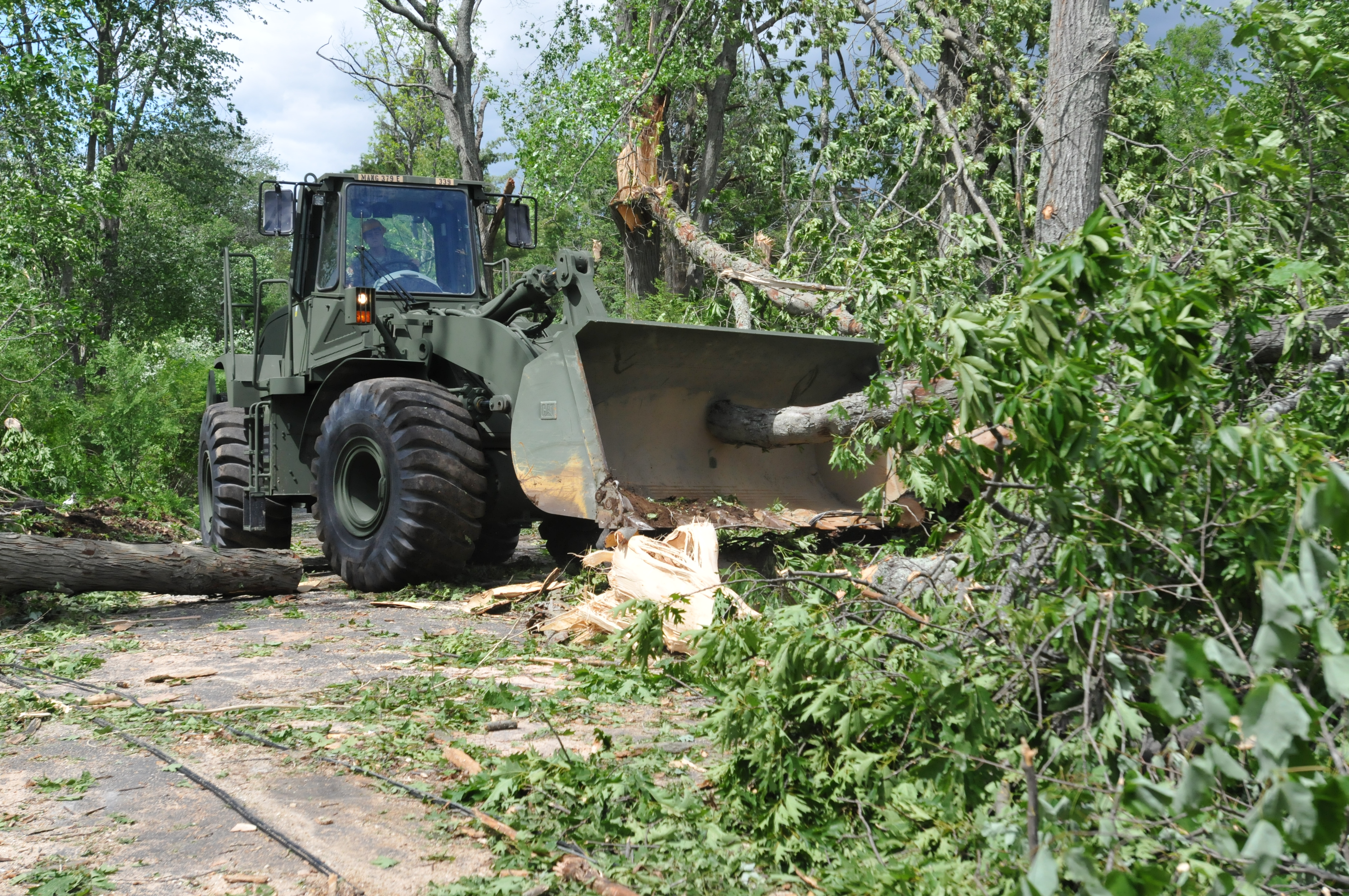
Massachusetts Army National Guard personnel removing tornado debris in Wilbraham

On June 15, the Federal Emergency Management Agency (FEMA) declared Hampden and Worcester Counties as major disaster areas, allowing for government aid to be distributed to affected residents. The following day, the number of insurance claims sharply rose from about 5,000 to 8,200. In addition to federal funds, state lawmakers passed a $50.3 million supplemental budget that included $15 million for emergency response, cleanup, and assistance and shelter to residents affected by the storms. By June 20, just over $1 million in individual aid had been provided to 254 households. $3.9M in federal funds were given to cities and towns for emergency items including debris removal and road and sidewalk repair. In addition to assistance from MassDOT and waiving of license replacement fees in June by the Massachusetts Registry of Motor Vehicles, Massport donated $300,000 in unused construction supplies from the Boston Logan Residential Soundproofing Program.

In Sturbridge, it took 18 months for the local auto body shop, Sturbridge Auto Body, to rebuild and reopen after being completely destroyed by the tornado. A significant amount of debris from the tornado landed in the Quinebaug River in Sturbridge, causing moderate flooding at Old Sturbridge Village. Flood conditions did not subside until after July, causing numerous scheduled events at Old Sturbridge Village to be canceled, including an Independence Day fireworks celebration.

=== Long-term effects ===
A section of tornado-cleared forest at the end of the tornado's path in Charlton is occasionally visited by student groups to learn about destructive weather and reforestation. The educational tours are offered by Pondside, an outdoor educational facility at Prindle Pond in Charlton.

In August 2012, the Unitarian Universalist Parish of Monson received a new steeple after it was destroyed by the tornado. In October 2013, the First Church of Monson similarly replaced its destroyed steeple.

In May 2014, the Town of Southbridge received $1 million from the Commonwealth of Massachusetts for reconstruction work at Southbridge Municipal Airport, to renovate multiple buildings and rebuild a hangar destroyed by the tornado.

In October 2017, a rebuilt South End Community Center in Springfield opened on Marble Street, funded by $6 million in federal disaster funding and $4 million in city funds.

In August 2018, Pope Francis Preparatory School opened on the site of the former Cathedral High School, which was severely damaged by the tornado and demolished in 2014.

On June 1, 2021, the tenth anniversary of the tornado, a monument commemorating the tornado's impact on Springfield was unveiled in the East Forest Park neighborhood.

== Other tornadoes ==
In addition to the Springfield tornado, five other tornadoes also impacted the greater New England area.

Confirmed tornadoes by Enhanced Fujita rating
EFU	EF0	EF1	EF2	EF3	EF4	EF5	Total
0	1	4	0	0	0	0	5

List of confirmed tornadoes – Wednesday, June 1, 2011
EF#	Location	County / Parish	State	Start Coord.	Time (UTC)	Path length	Max width
EF1	ESE of Bethel	Oxford	ME	44.4038°N 70.6817°W	19:35–19:36	0.26 mi (420 m)	25 yd (23 m)
EF1	A brief tornado touched down to the northwest of Bryant Pond, snapping or uprooting numerous trees. Tree limbs were thrown up to 0.5 miles (0.80 km) away.						
EF1	S of New Portland to S of Embden	Somerset	ME	44.9087°N 70.0273°W	21:51–22:06	8.38 mi (13.49 km)	200 yd (180 m)
EF1	Hundreds of trees were snapped or uprooted, and several buildings, along with at least one vehicle, were damaged. Winds were estimated at 90 to 100 mph (140 to 160 km/h).						
EF1	Wilbraham	Hampden	MA	42.140°N 72.480°W	22:32–22:40	4.16 mi (6.69 km)	200 yd (180 m)
EF1	Numerous trees were downed, and large limbs were snapped. Some trees fell onto homes and across roads.						
EF1	N of Brimfield	Hampden	MA	42.140°N 72.480°W	22:54–22:57	1.69 mi (2.72 km)	100 yd (91 m)
EF1	Numerous trees were snapped or uprooted.						
EF0	NE of Fiskdale	Worcester	MA	42.1541°N 72.0677°W	23:10–23:13	1.42 mi (2.29 km)	25 yd (23 m)
EF0	Numerous trees were downed in and just east of Wells State Park, one of which fell on and damaged a home. Multiple campers were in Wells State Park when the tornado passed through; there were no injuries.						

== See also ==
- List of North American tornadoes and tornado outbreaks
- Worcester tornado – An F4 tornado that caused catastrophic damage and loss of life in the city of Worcester and throughout Central Massachusetts in 1953.
- July 1989 Northeastern United States tornado outbreak – The previous tornado outbreak to affect the Northeast.
- Great Barrington tornado – The third (and most recent) F4 tornado to affect Massachusetts.
