= Elias Brookings School =

- U.S. National Register of Historic Places
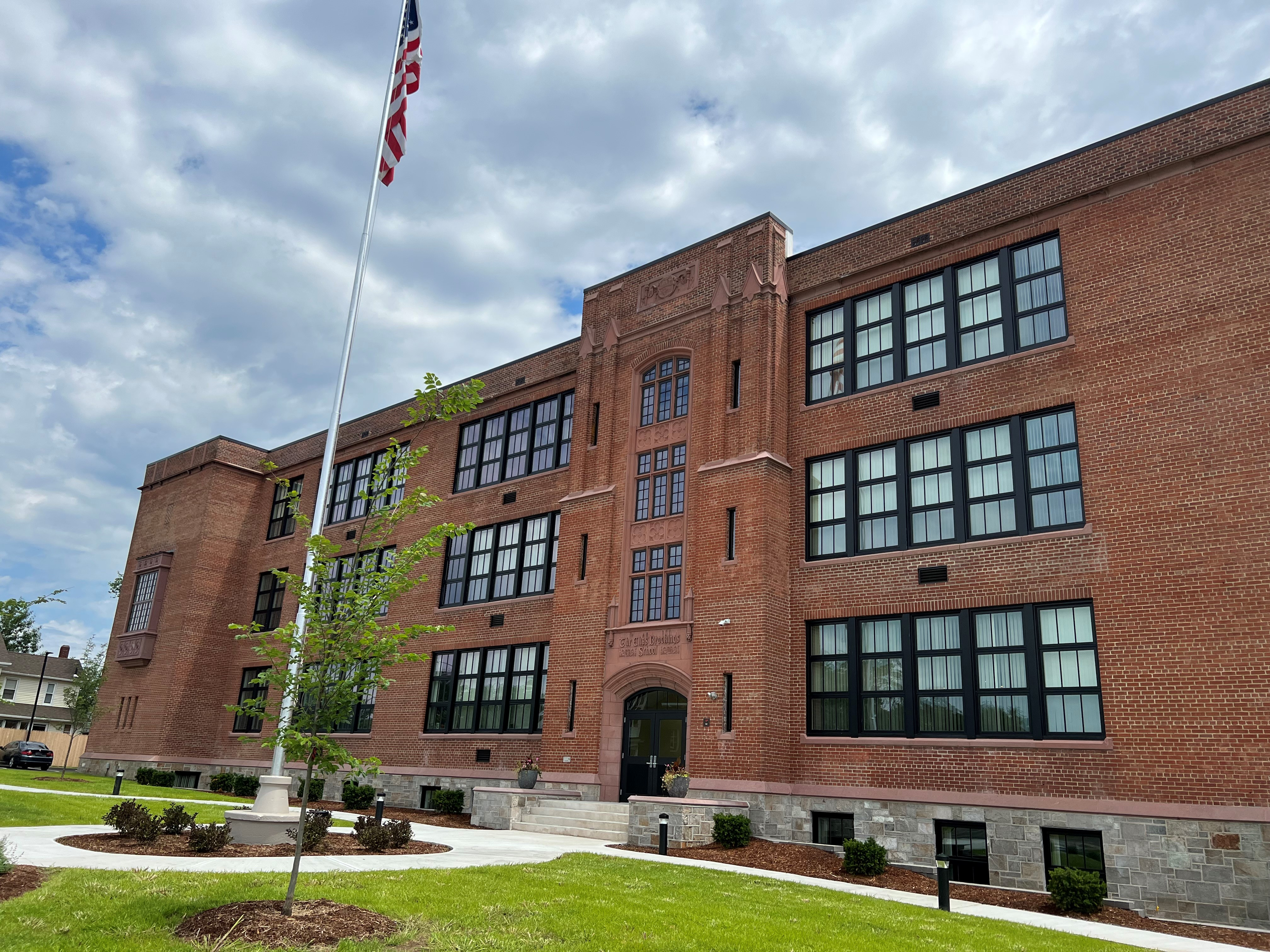

- Location within Massachusetts Location within the United States
- Location: 367 Hancock St., Springfield, Massachusetts
- Coordinates: 42°05′57″N 72°34′0″W
- Area: 1.8 acres (0.73 ha)
- Built: 1925
- Architect: Morris W. Maloney
- Architectural style: Collegiate Gothic
- NRHP reference No.: 100008959
- Added to NRHP: May 4, 2023

The Elias Brookings School is a historic former school building at 367 Hancock Street in the Six Corners neighborhood of Springfield, Massachusetts. Built in 1925, it is a good local example of period school architecture. It was used as a school until 2011, when it suffered extensive damage in a rare tornado. It was listed on the National Register of Historic Places in 2023.

== Description and history ==
The Elias Brookings School is located east of downtown Springfield in the Six Corners neighborhood. It is set on the east side of Hancock Street, just north of Ruth Elizabeth Park. It is a three-story masonry structure, built of brick, stone, and concrete, on a sloping lot with an exposed basement level to the south. It has an L shape, with the main block extending along Hancock Street, and a rear projecting auditorium wing at the north end. The main entrance is centrally placed on the western facade in a slightly projecting section. The entry is flanked by banks of classroom windows, with projecting sections at the north and south ends of the building.

The school was built in 1925 and opened in 1926. It was designed by local architect Morris W. Maloney, who is credited with school designs in other regional communities. The school was designed to house 1,100 students, and featured the latest advances in ventilation and fireproof construction. It served the community until 2011, when a tornado did extensive damage to the school and surrounding area on June 1.

In June, 2018 the building was purchased from the City of Springfield by Home City Development, Inc. for the purpose of adapting and reusing the building as affordable housing. Construction began in March, 2021 and was complete in April, 2022. The building now includes 42 one, two and three-bedroom rental apartments, 35 of which are affordable to households with income at or below 60% of area median, and 7 affordable to households with income at or below 80% of area median.

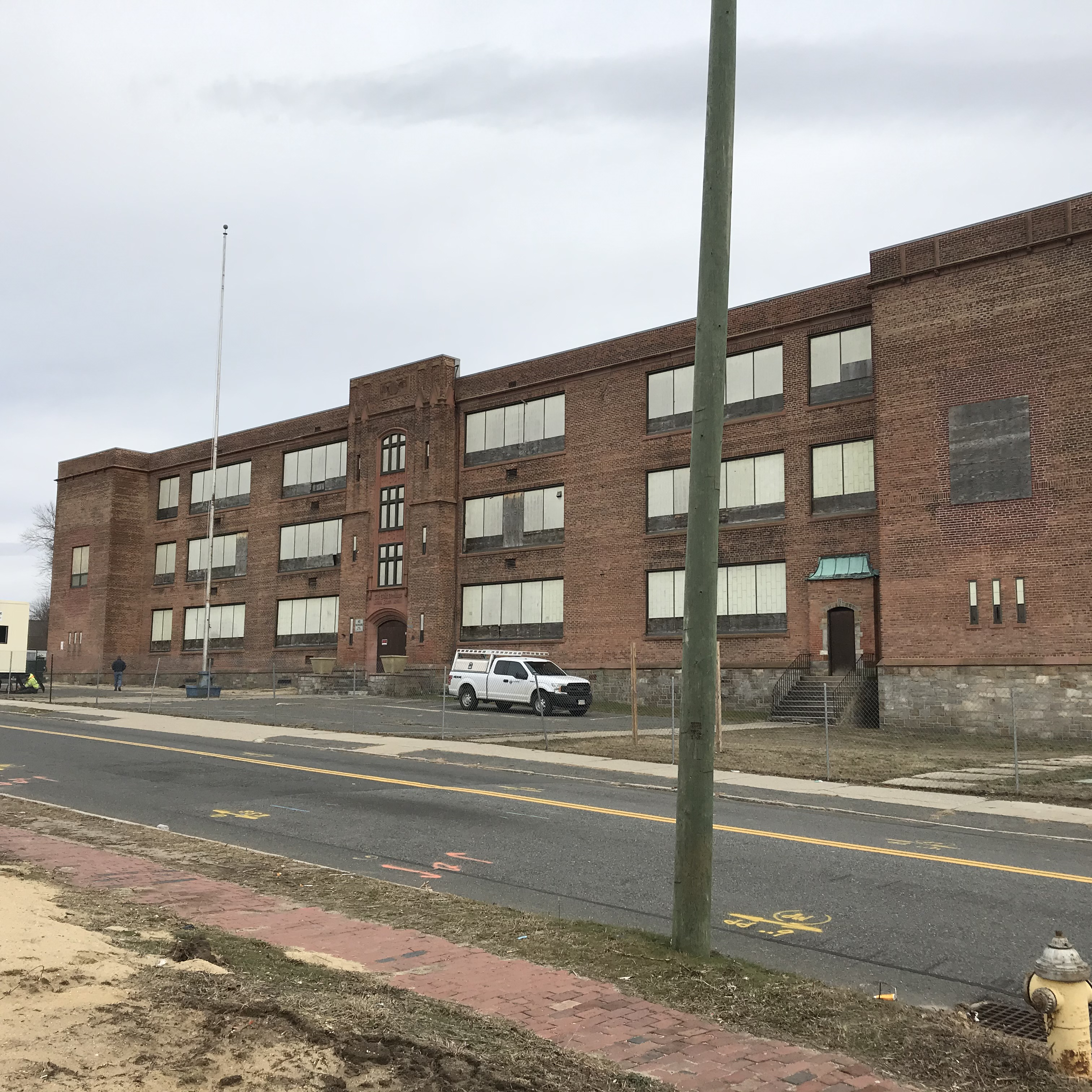
December 2020

In October, 2021, the city of Springfield created the Elias Brookings Local Historic District. In May, 2023, the National Park Service placed the building on the National Register of Historic Places.

== See also ==
- National Register of Historic Places listings in Springfield, Massachusetts
- National Register of Historic Places listings in Hampden County, Massachusetts
