= Mills-Hale-Owen Blocks =

- Mills–Hale–Owen Blocks
- U.S. National Register of Historic Places
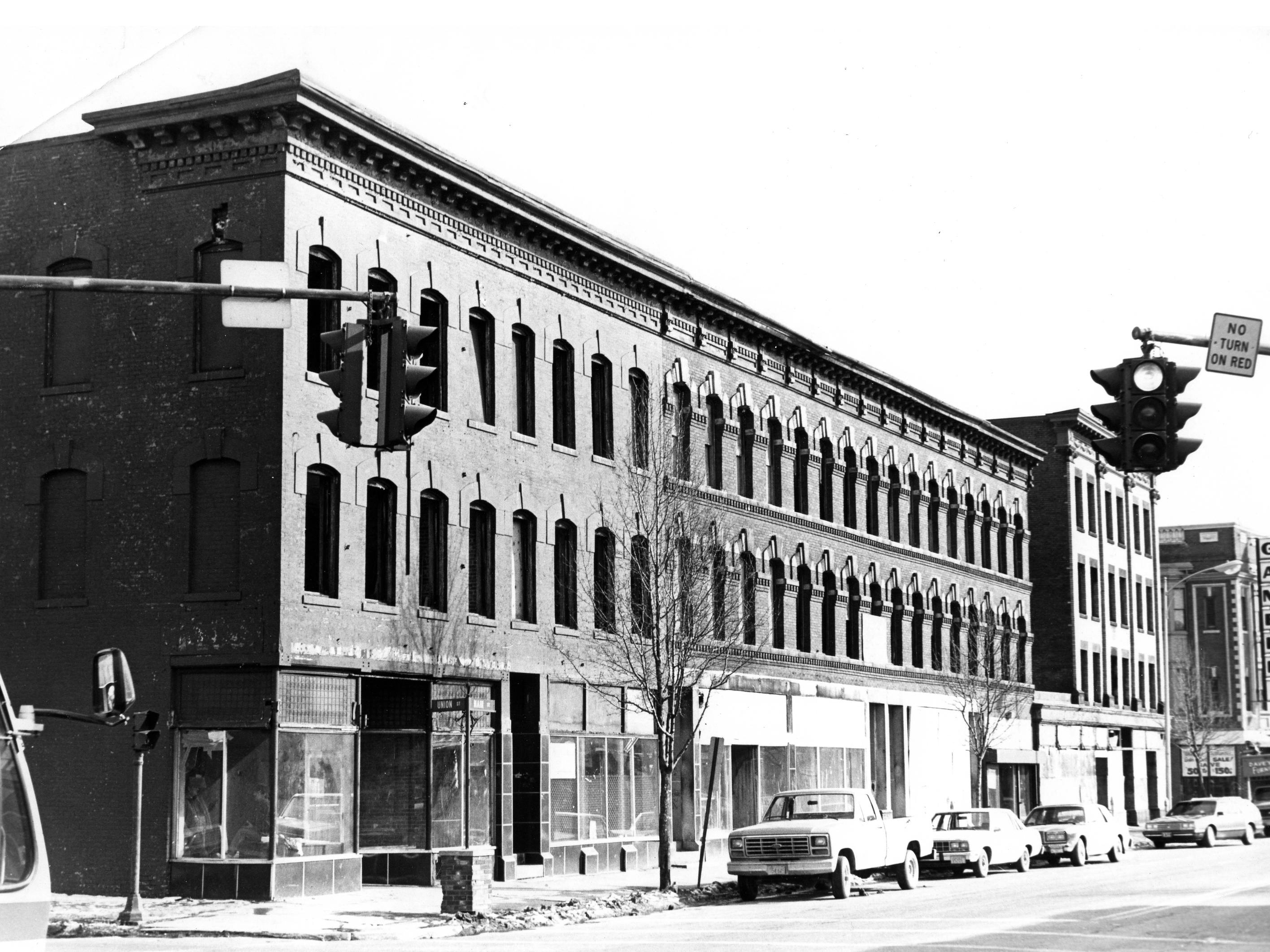
- 1985 photo

- Location within Massachusetts Location within the United States
- Location: 959-991 Main St., Springfield, Massachusetts
- Coordinates: 42°5′56″N 72°35′6″W
- Area: less than one acre
- Built: 1874
- Architect: Mills, Warren; Owen, Frank W.
- Architectural style: Italianate
- NRHP reference No.: 85003424
- Added to NRHP: October 31, 1985

The Mills—Hale—Owen Blocks were a collection of three historic mixed-use commercial and residential blocks at 959—991 Main Street in the South End of Springfield, Massachusetts. They occupied an entire city block on the east side of Main Street, between Union and Hubbard Streets, and were some of the city's best examples of commercial Italianate architecture, prior to their destruction in the 2011 Springfield tornado. They were listed on the National Register of Historic Places in 1985.

== Description and history ==
The Mills, Hale, and Owen blocks formed a single monolithic block on Main Street between Union and Hubbard Streets on Springfield's south side. The Mills and Hale Blocks occupied the left portion of the block, and were both three stories in height, with similarly styled cornices of equal height. Both had several ground-floor retail spaces, with recessed entrances flanked by plate glass windows. Upper-story windows were set in segmented arches, with keystoned lintels; those on the Hale Block had a more elaborate brick corbelling in the surround. The Owen Block, at the right end, was four stories in height. Pilasters separated the upper story window bays into pairs, and the ground-floor storefronts were topped by pressed tin frieze.

The Mills and Hale blocks were both built in 1874, and were two of the best examples of Italianate architecture of the period in the city. They were also the first major buildings built in a push to extend the downtown area to the south, and introduced the mixed use style of building use to the area. The Owen Block was built in 1899 in a Classical Revival style reflective of the further expansion of Springfield's downtown area. All three buildings housed a variety of retail businesses on their ground floors. The upper floors of the Mills block were first used as a boarding house, while those of the other two served as residential tenement-style housing. The buildings were rehabilitated in the 1980s, and listed on the National Register of Historic Places in 1985.

The buildings sustained extreme damage during the 2011 Springfield tornado, with the top floor of at least one of the buildings partially collapsing. The buildings were demolished eight days later due to the irreparable damage.

== See also ==
- National Register of Historic Places listings in Springfield, Massachusetts
- National Register of Historic Places listings in Hampden County, Massachusetts
