= Brimfield State Forest =

Protected area in Massachusetts, United States

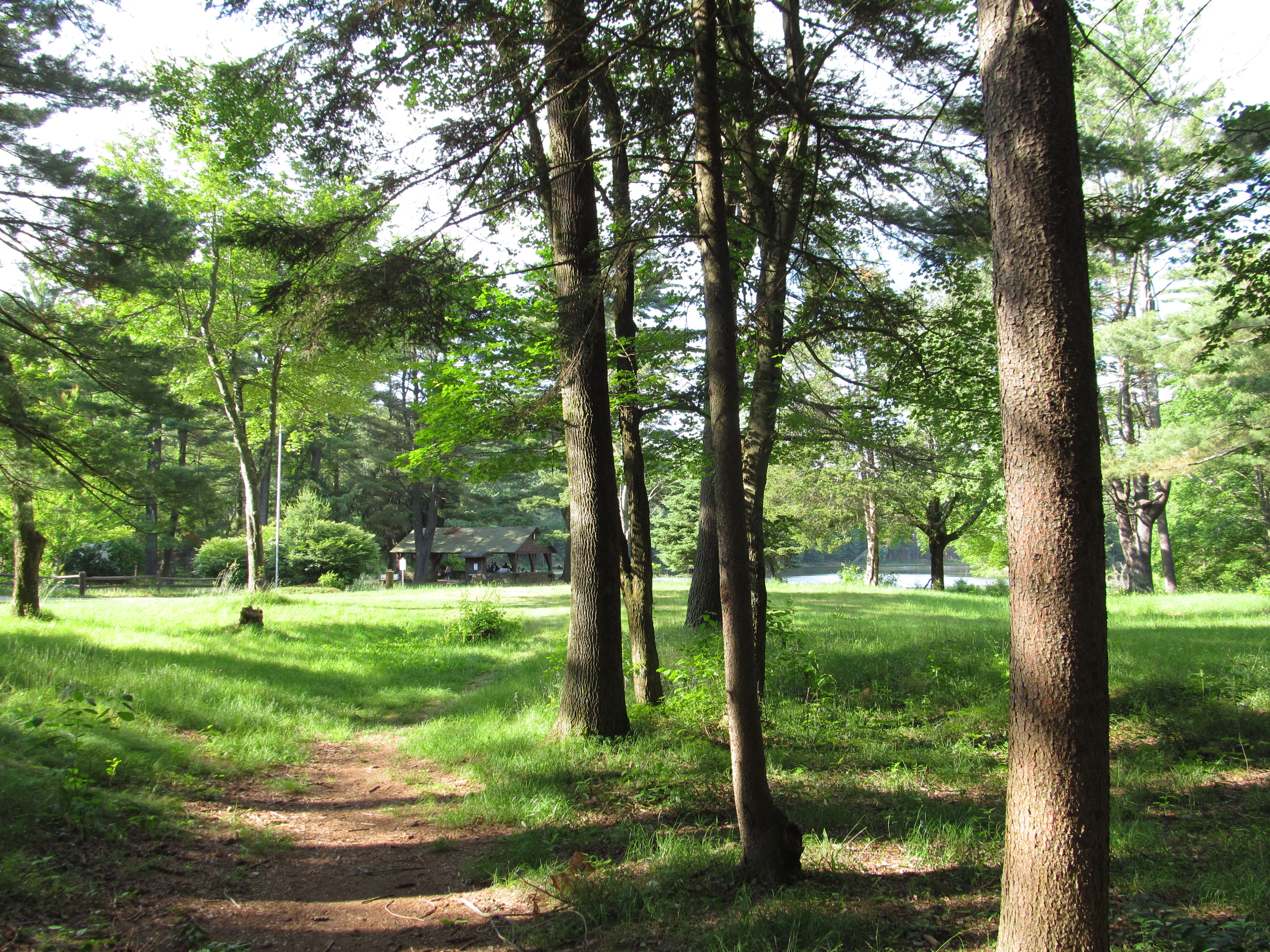
- Dean Pond Recreation Area

- Location within Massachusetts Location within the United States
- Location: Brimfield, Monson and Wales, Massachusetts, United States
- Coordinates: 42°06′04″N 72°16′13″W
- Area: 3,523 acres (1,426 ha)
- Elevation: 653 ft (199 m)
- Established: 1924
- Administrator: Massachusetts Department of Conservation and Recreation
- Website: Official website

Brimfield State Forest is a Massachusetts state forest located in and around the town of Brimfield in Hampden County, Massachusetts. The forest includes Dean Pond Recreation Area, a popular spot for fishing, picnicking and swimming. The park is managed by the Department of Conservation and Recreation.

== Activities and amenities ==
- Trails: Over 20 miles (32 km) of roads and trails are used for hiking, horseback riding, mountain biking, and cross-country skiing.
- Day-use area: Dean Pond Recreation Area offers a 100-foot-long (30 m) swimming beach, picnic grounds, and fully accessible restrooms.
- The forest also offers fishing and restricted hunting.

== In the news ==
Following a tornado in 2011, the Dean Pond Recreation Area was closed for two years. It reopened in 2013.
