= State Armory (Springfield, Massachusetts) =

- U.S. National Register of Historic Places
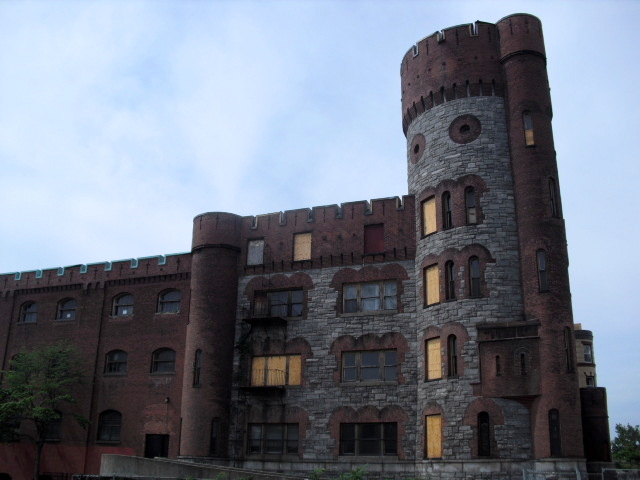

- Location within Massachusetts Location within the United States
- Location: Springfield, Massachusetts
- Coordinates: 42°5′55″N 72°35′12″W
- Area: less than one acre
- Built: 1895
- Architect: Wait & Cutter; Gardner, Pyne & Gardner
- Architectural style: Late Victorian
- NRHP reference No.: 76000254
- Added to NRHP: May 3, 1976

The State Armory is a historic armory building at 29 Howard Street in Springfield, Massachusetts. Built in 1895, it is a prominent and distinctive example of Gothic architecture in the city's downtown. The building was the first that was purpose-built for the local militia, and was in its later years home to the South End Community Center. It was listed on the National Register of Historic Places in 1976. It was extensively damaged by the Greater Springfield tornado on June 1, 2011, in which the rear drill shed of the building was reduced to rubble.

The building was sold by the City of Springfield to MGM Resorts for $1.6 million in 2014 as part of the MGM Springfield redevelopment project, a mixed use redevelopment including casino, hotel, movie theatres, skating rink, restaurants, and shops. While the Drill Shed and rear of building was lost, the stone structure was fully restored on the exterior with the interior stabilized and cleared out. The building currently houses ROAR Comedy Club, a stand-up comedy club operated by MGM Springfield.

== Description and history ==
The former State Armory building is located in downtown Springfield, on the south side of Howard Street west of Main Street. The construction of its front section is primarily granite, with decorative elements of brick and brownstone. It has towers that are 50 feet (15 m) and 60 feet (18 m) tall with crenellated brick battlements and a parapet connecting the two front towers. The mass of the building is directly on Howard Street, and historically loomed over its neighbors. (Most of the area is now part of the MGM Springfield casino complex.)

Attached to the rear of the front section, extending to Union Street, was a large gable-roofed drill shed, built out of brick with brownstone trim. The shed was destroyed by the Greater Springfield tornado on June 1, 2011, and is now the site of the French Congregational Church, which was relocated there as part of the casino construction.

The armory was built in 1895 to a design by Wait & Cutter of Boston, with local architects Gardner, Pyne & Gardner supervising. It was the first dedicated facility for the Springfield companies of the state militia. It served for many years as the main facility for all militia companies based in western Massachusetts, and was also the largest space in the city for social functions.

== See also ==
- National Register of Historic Places listings in Springfield, Massachusetts
