= Southbridge Municipal Airport =

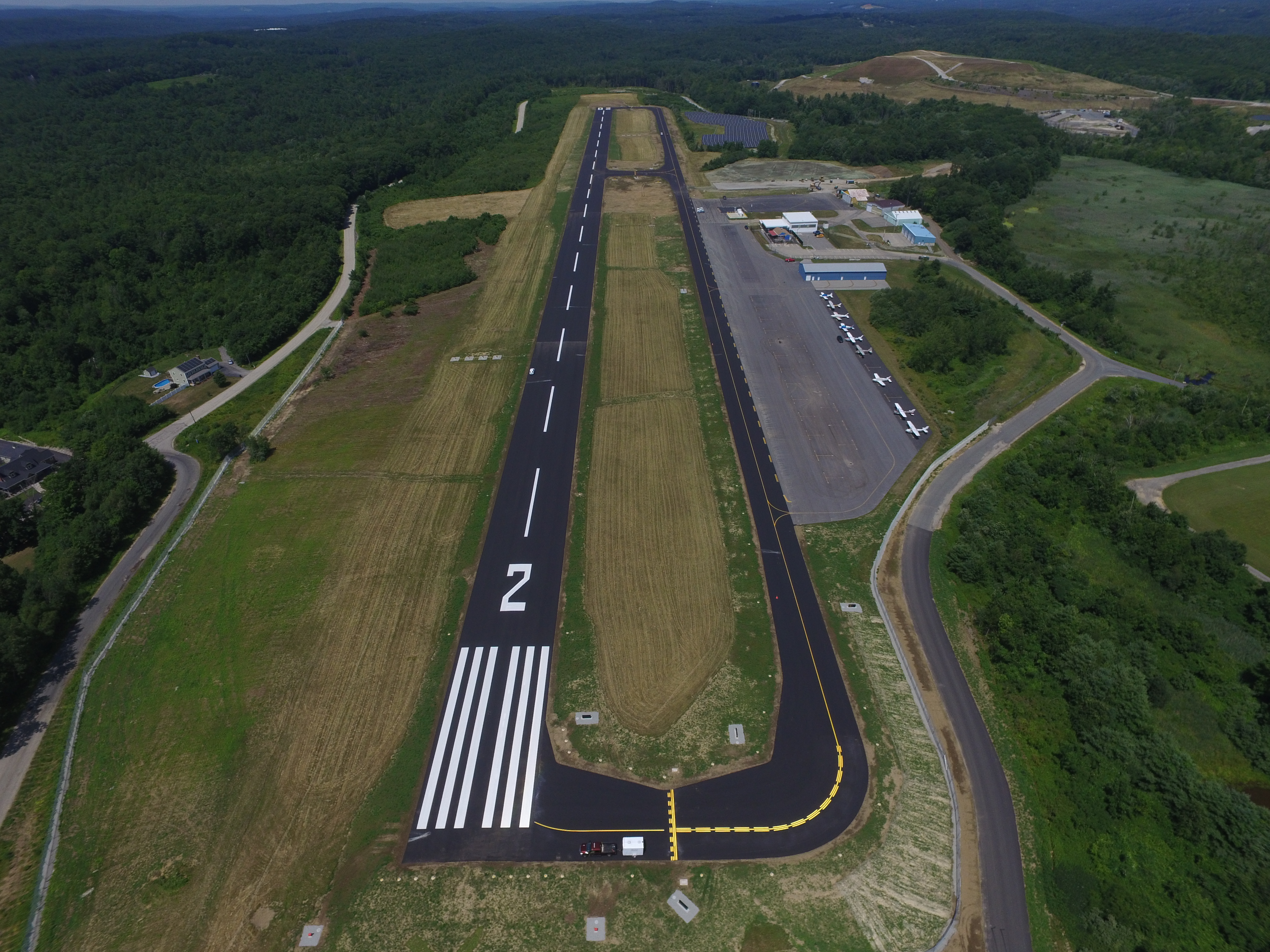
- Southbridge Municipal Airport (July 2022)
- IATA: none; ICAO: none; FAA LID: 3B0

Summary
- Airport type: Public
- Operator: Town of Southbridge
- Location: Southbridge, Massachusetts, US
- Elevation AMSL: 699 ft (213 m)
- Coordinates: 42°06′03″N 72°02′18″W
- Website: ci.southbridge.ma.us

Map
- Interactive map of Southbridge Municipal Airport

Runways
Direction	Length		Surface
Direction	ft	m	Surface
2/20	3,500	1,067	Asphalt

Southbridge Municipal Airport (FAA LID: 3B0) is a public airport located in the northern part of the Town of Southbridge, a city in Worcester County, Massachusetts, United States. The single-runway airport is owned and operated by the Town of Southbridge and overseen by the Southbridge Municipal Airport Commission.

== History and usage ==
Construction of the airport occurred in 1944. From the mid-1950s through the mid-1970's, the airport was mainly used by American Optical Company for its employees to fly between the headquarters in Southbridge and their 27 plants. A full-length taxiway adjacent to the runway was added in 1989 as part of a $745,000 initiative mostly funded by federal grant money, as by that point there were over 70 planes based at the airport (up from 15 only five years prior), and 25 to 30 takeoffs or landings each day. The number of airplanes based at the airport decreased to around 40 by 1993, was down to 28 by 2000, and didn't return up to 50 aircraft until 2007.

== Facilities ==
Southbridge Municipal Airport consists of 264 acres (107 ha) of land, and has a single runway numbered 2/20, though the airport lacks an air traffic control tower. The asphalt runway is 3,500 feet (1,100 m) long by 75 feet (23 m) wide. A major $7 million runway reconstruction project in 2022 included new lighting systems.

== Services ==
The property includes a flying school, an airplane maintenance service, and a restaurant. Airplane fuel is available from an 8,000-US-gallon (30,000 L; 6,700 imp gal) tank.

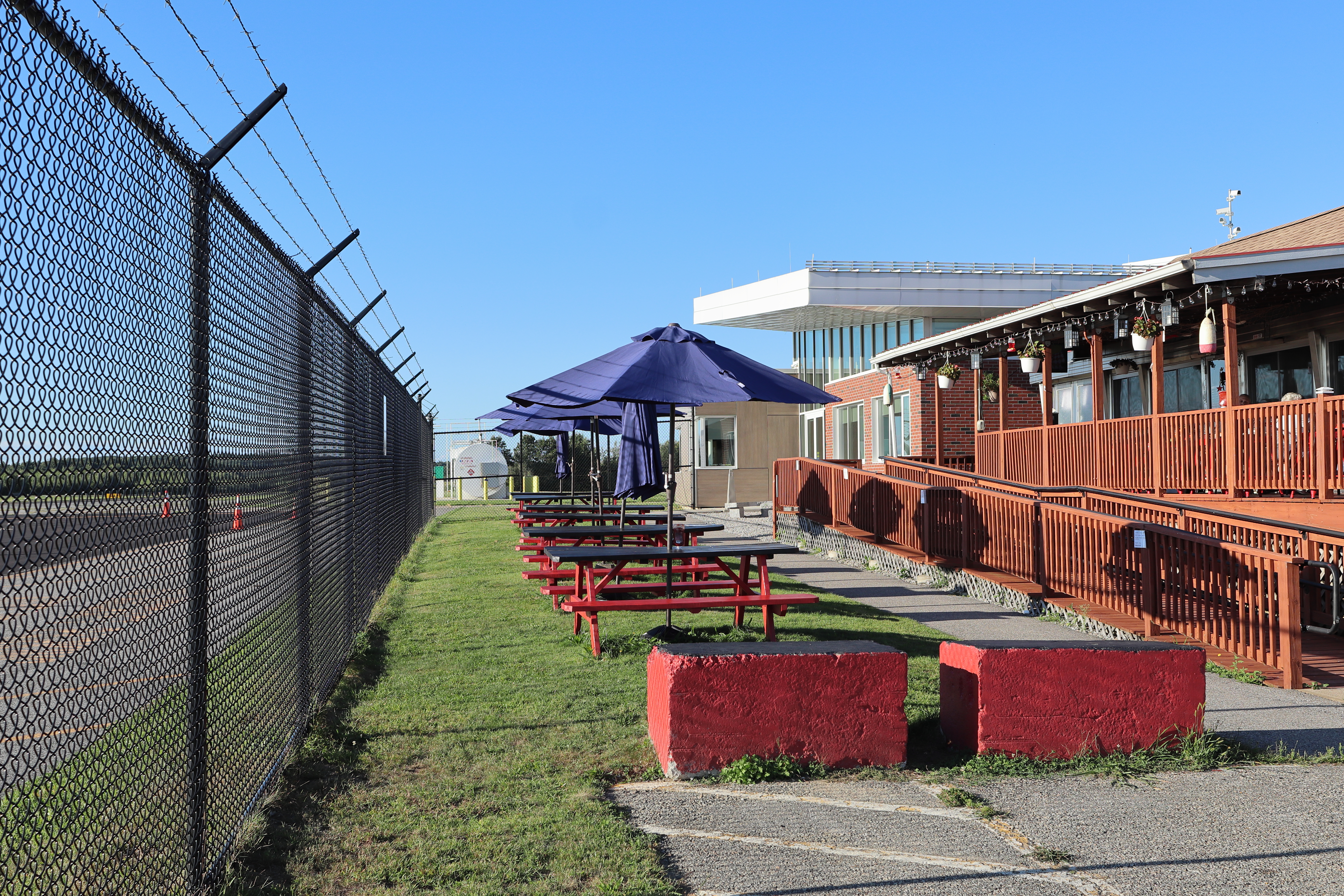
Outdoor restaurant seating

== Incidents ==
On the night of March 11, 1989, a plane piloted by George E. Keyes crashed into trees about one and a half miles (2.4 km) east of Southbridge Municipal Airport, killing Keyes and his passenger. Keyes had been a pilot since 1946 and regularly used the airport. Snow had started falling, and witnesses reported that the plane had circled several times before losing power. A toxicity report showed a blood alcohol level in the pilot of .19 percent, leading a spokesperson for the National Transportation Safety Board to say, "There is no doubt in my mind that his performance was likely to be impaired."

Around noon on November 26, 1995, a plane piloted by Louis Furnas attempted to make an emergency landing in Southbridge after leaving New Bedford Airport to travel to Northampton. The engine had stopped working and the aircraft crashed into a briar patch about one-quarter mile (400 m) from the airport. The pilot and the two passengers were injured but survived. Federal investigators determined that the engine failure was probably due to carburetor icing.

On June 28, 1997, Robert William Jeffway was flying a Cessna 185 testing a recently-installed engine when it lost power. He had departed Southbridge Municipal Airport about two hours prior, and was flying over Charlton. He attempted to land in a pond, but clipped a high-tension wire and crashed into a swamp. Jeffway only received bumps and bruises and manage to extract himself from the plane and walk through the swamp to get to the nearest road.

A 1995 Ford Mustang car speeding on the runway on the evening of December 1, 2003 rolled over and injured its five occupants. They were treated at Harrington Memorial Hospital and released.

A pilot reported a "near catastrophe" at the airport in May 2009 after needing to slam the plane's brakes on while accelerating for takeoff when a group of deer strayed onto the runway.

A Grumman American AA-5 was damaged on July 13, 2015 after landing in trees by the airport, the three people within were unharmed.

== June 1, 2011 tornado ==
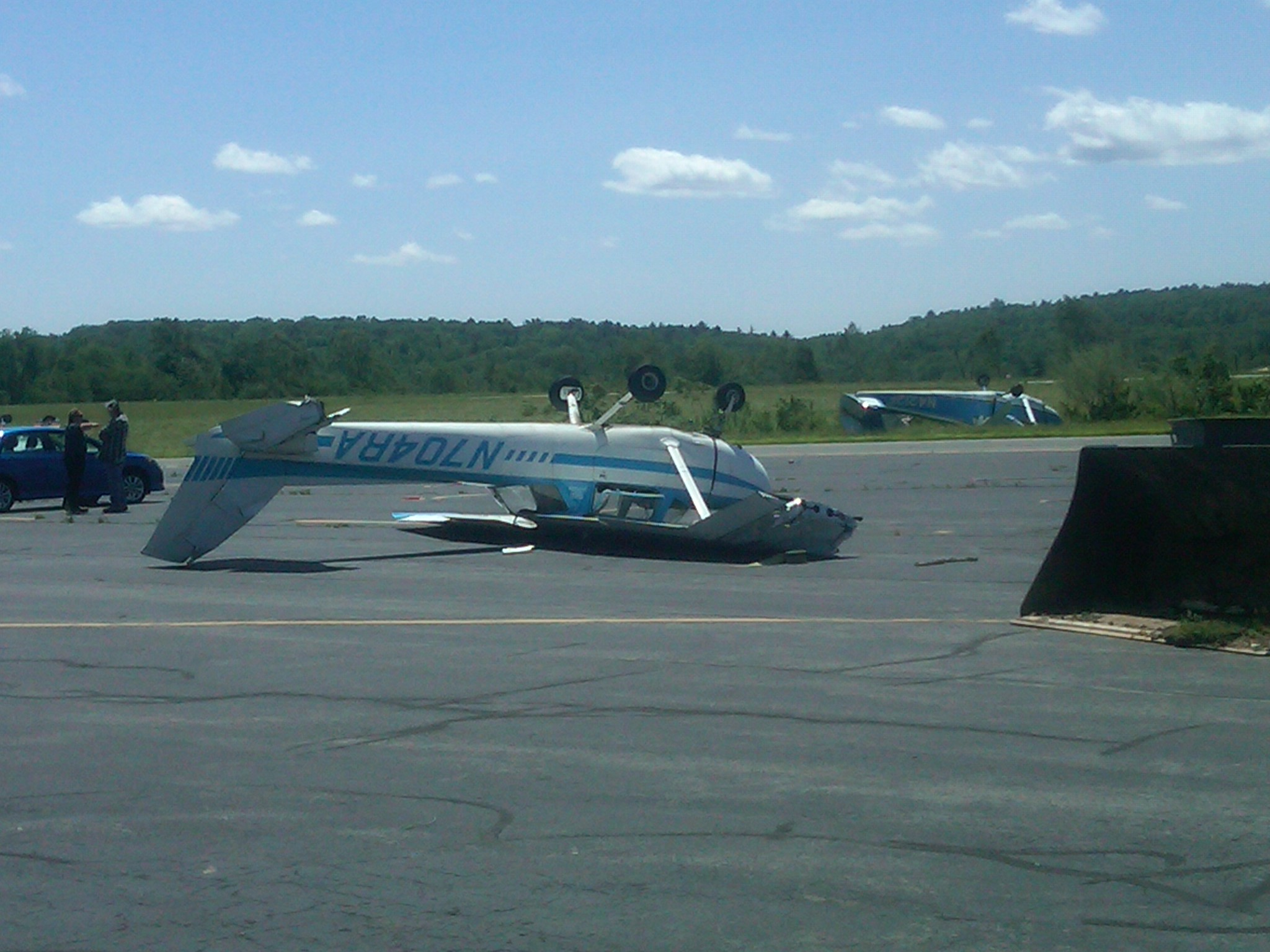
Damage from 2011 tornado

The airport sustained significant damage on June 1, 2011 from a tornado. Three of the six buildings were destroyed, and between 18 and 20 tenants lost their hangar slots and airplanes, which was more than half of the airplanes based at the airport. Some of the airplanes landed upside-down in the woods. Airport manager Ronald Plouffe said that the airport "lost one hanger right to the concrete. It just blew the whole hanger away." There was also damage to the roof of the airport's diner. After reviewing all the damage at the airport, Senator John Kerry said, "This is the most significant natural disaster damage that I've seen in our state. We've seen pictures of it, obviously, in other states. Somehow we've always thought Massachusetts didn't see this kind of thing."

While there had been some discussion by Southbridge officials about whether it would make sense to try selling the land or using it for some other purpose, rather than rebuilding the airport, the Town Council ultimately decided to appropriate the insurance money for making the repairs.

== See also ==
- List of airports in Massachusetts
