= Frederick S. Newman =

American architect

Frederick Savage Newman
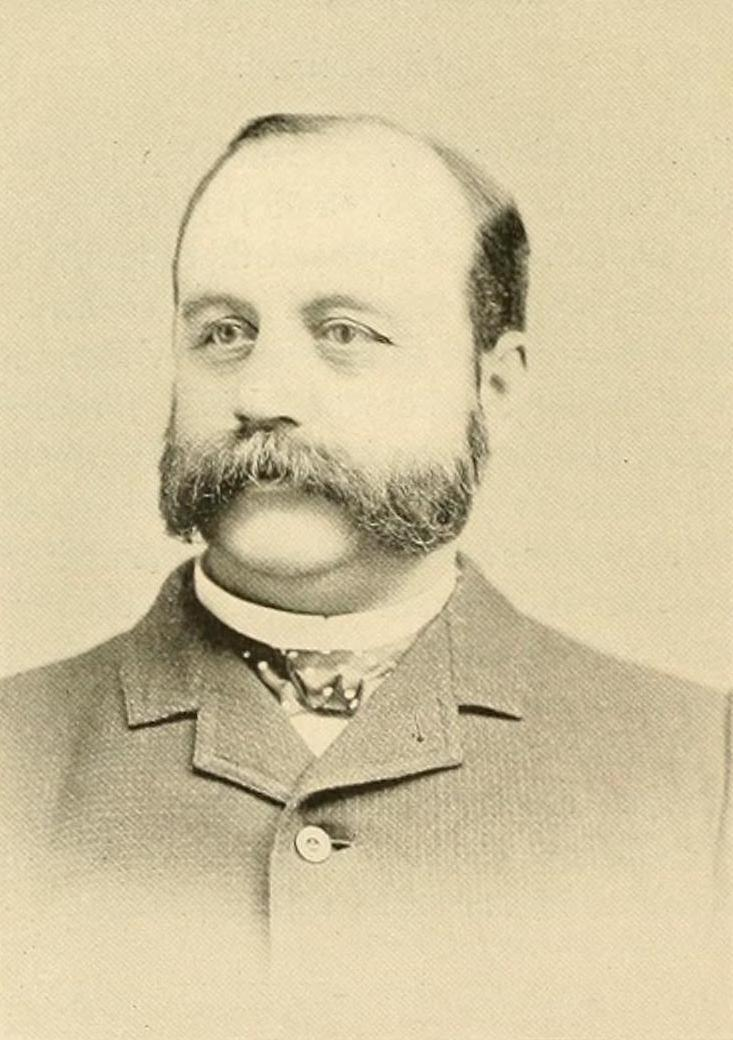
- Frederick S. Newman, circa 1896
- Born: August 26, 1847; Bangor, Maine
- Died: March 6, 1906 (aged 58); Manchester, New Hampshire
- Occupation: Architect

Frederick S. Newman (1847-1906) was an American architect based in Springfield, Massachusetts.

== Life and career ==
Frederick Savage Newman was born August 26, 1847, in Bangor, Maine, to Alden Newman and Nancy (Ellis) Newman. In his youth the family relocated to Henniker, New Hampshire, where he learned the carpentry trade and was educated in the public schools. He later moved to Springfield, where he worked as a carpenter for contractor E. W. Shattuck and as draftsman for engineer A. J. Aldrich and architect Eugene C. Gardner. On November 1, 1882, Newman left Gardner and opened his own office in Springfield. He designed several large buildings in Springfield, and major commissions in Hartford and Philadelphia led him to open branch offices in those cities in 1890 and 1894, respectively.

In later life Newman speculated in real estate and suffered significant losses. Circa 1904 he left Springfield and moved to Manchester, New Hampshire, where he practiced architecture until his death in 1906.

== Personal life ==
Newman married in 1867, to Caroline E. Grimes of Peterborough, New Hampshire. They had no children. Newman died March 6, 1906, in Manchester, New Hampshire, after a brief illness.

== Legacy ==
In the 1880s Newman employed Fred H. Loverin, who would later establish a practice in Buffalo, New York. From 1890 to 1896 he employed Isaac A. Allen Jr., who in 1893 took charge of Newman's Hartford office. In 1896 Allen bought out Newman in Hartford and established his own practice.

Several of Newman's buildings in Springfield, and one in Connecticut, have been listed on the United States National Register of Historic Places.

== Architectural works ==
- Fuller Block, Springfield, Massachusetts (1887, NRHP 1983)
- Chicopee National Bank Building, Springfield, Massachusetts (1888–89)
- Memorial Hall, Windsor Locks, Connecticut (1890, NRHP 1987)
- Buckingham School, Springfield, Massachusetts (1891, demolished 1976)
- The Linden, Hartford, Connecticut (1891)
- Mittineague Congregational Church (former), West Springfield, Massachusetts (1891)
- R. C. Church and School of Our Lady of Perpetual Help, Holyoke, Massachusetts (1891, demolished)
- Court Square Building, Springfield, Massachusetts (1892 and 1899)
- Ballerstein Building, Hartford, Connecticut (1893, demolished)
- Cutler and Porter Block, Springfield, Massachusetts (1894, NRHP 1983)
- Driscoll's Block, Springfield, Massachusetts (1894, NRHP 1983)
- Fidelity Mutual Life Insurance Company Building, Philadelphia, Pennsylvania (1894, demolished)

== Gallery of architectural works ==
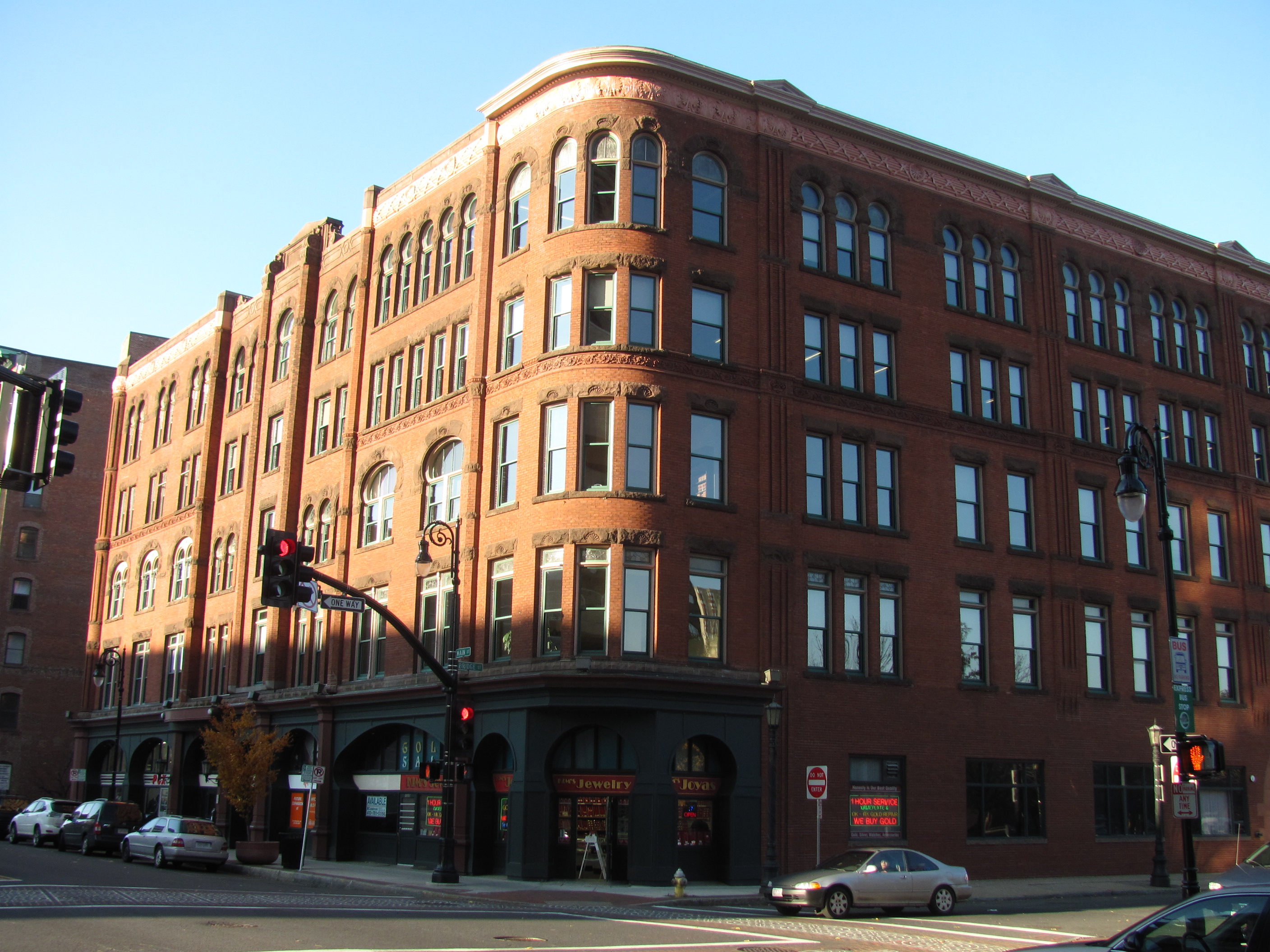
Fuller Block, Springfield, Massachusetts, 1887.

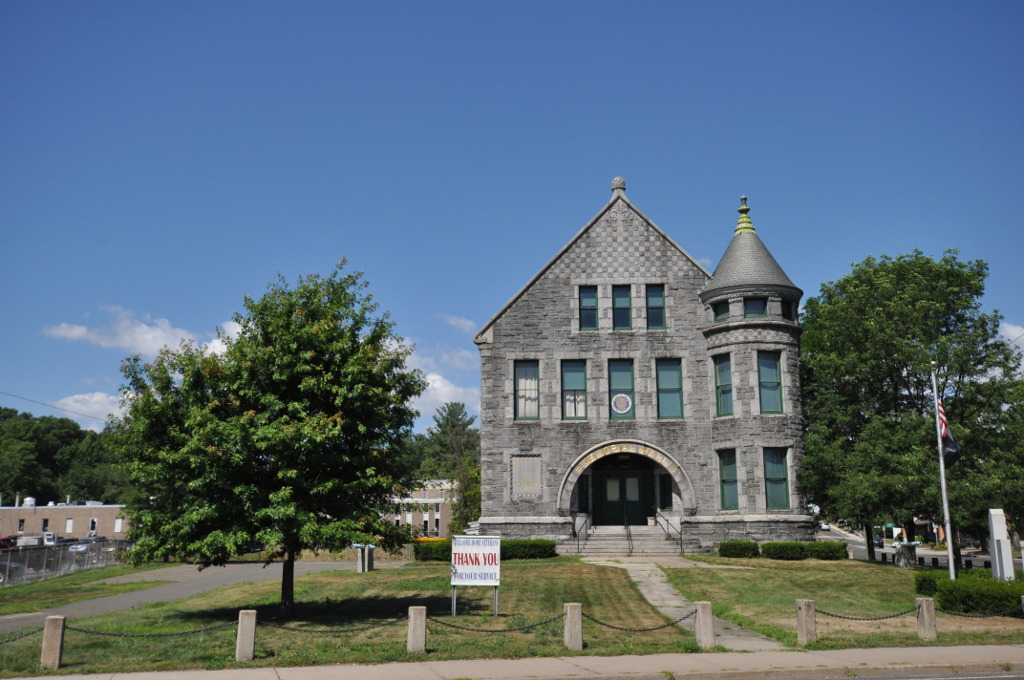
Memorial Hall, Windsor Locks, Connecticut, 1890.

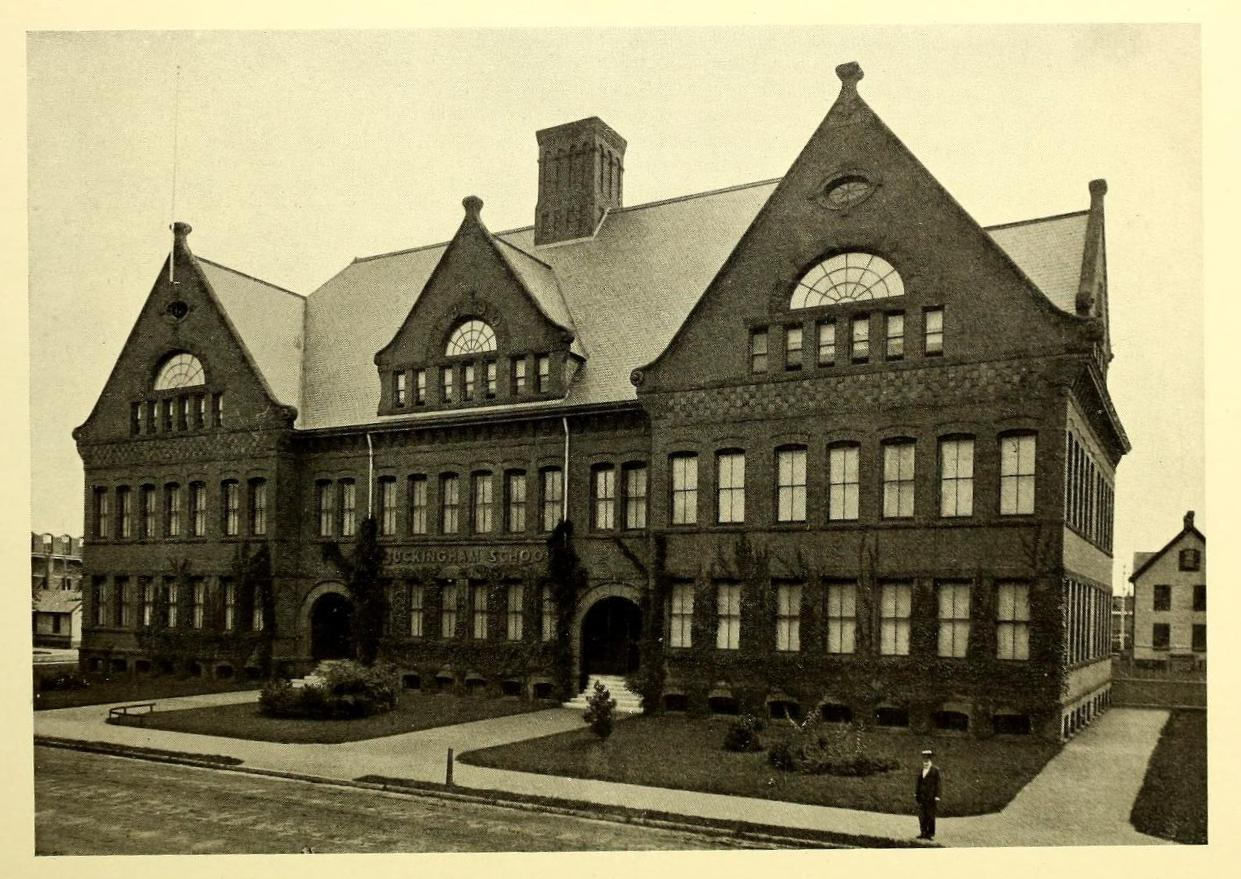
Buckingham School, Springfield, Massachusetts, 1891.

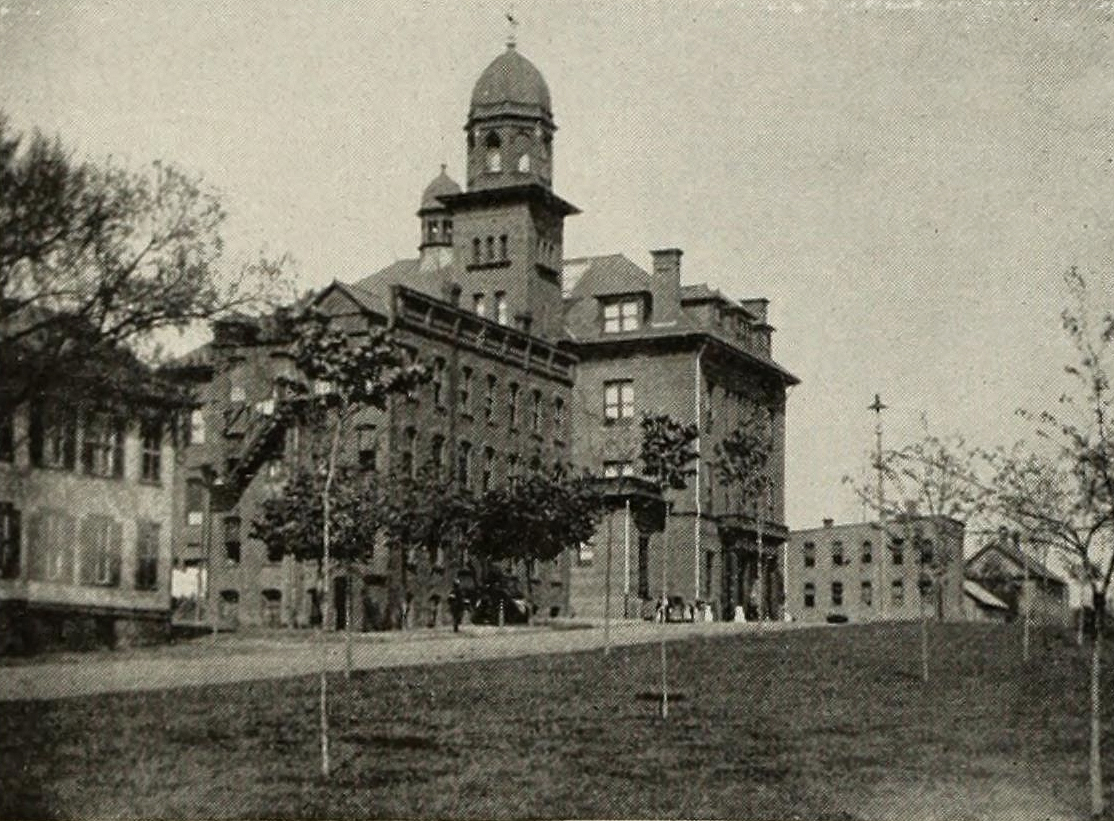
R. C. Church and School of Our Lady of Perpetual Help, Holyoke, Massachusetts, 1891.

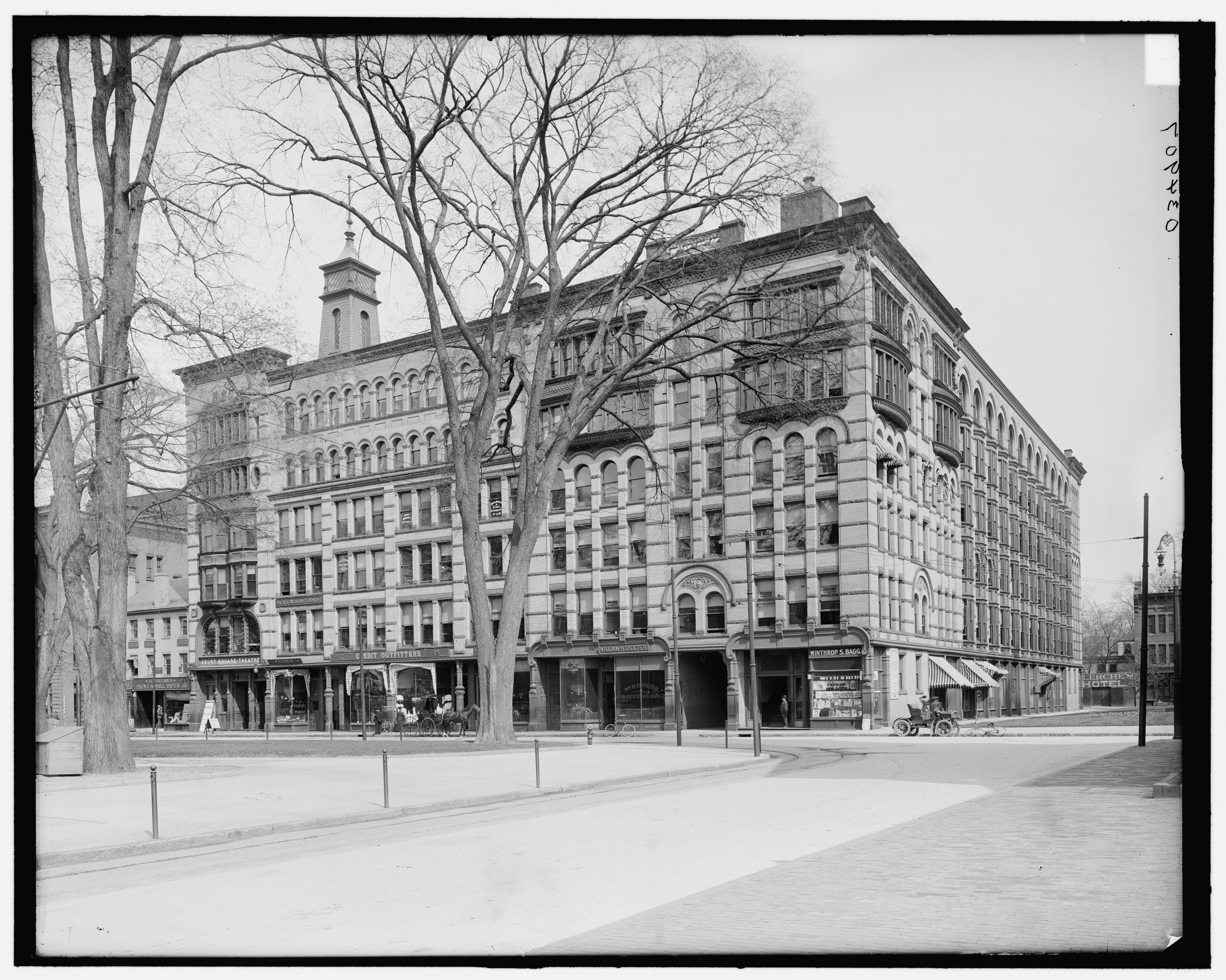
Court Square Building, Springfield, Massachusetts, 1892 and 1899.

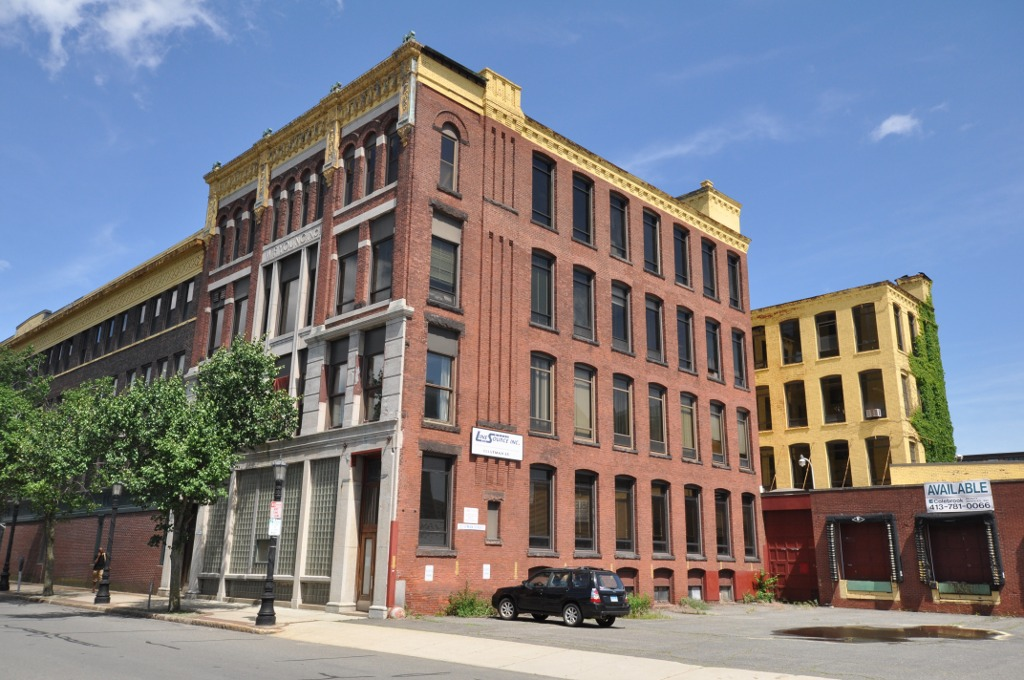
Cutler and Porter Block, Springfield, Massachusetts, 1894.

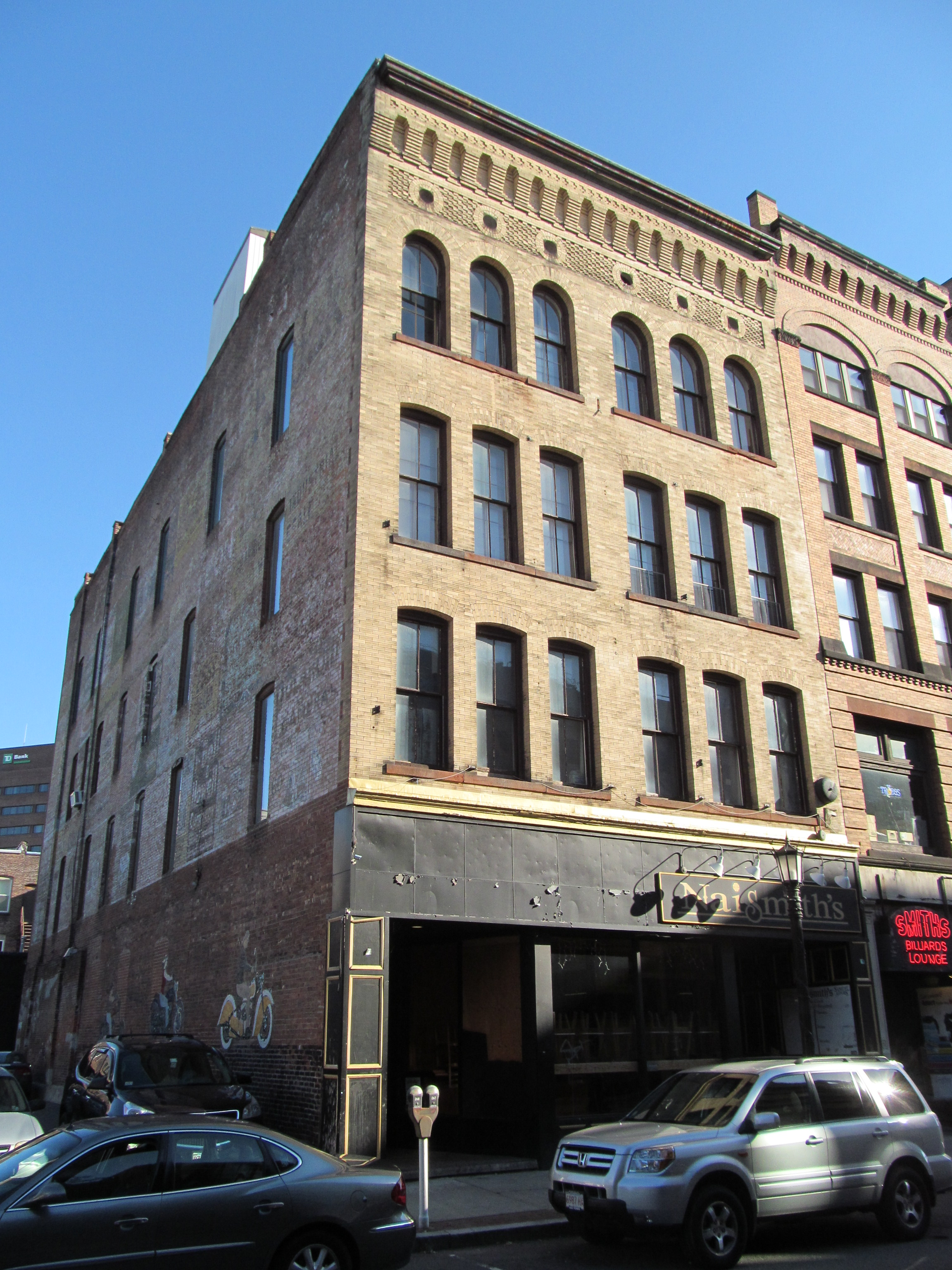
Driscoll's Block, Springfield, Massachusetts, 1894.
