= Produce Exchange =

A produce exchange is a commodity exchange that specialises in foods and foodstuffs.

Produce Exchange may refer to:

== United Kingdom ==
- Produce Exchange Buildings, Liverpool

== United States ==
- New York Produce Exchange
- Produce Exchange Building, in Springfield, Massachusetts
