= Driscoll (disambiguation) =

Driscoll, or O'Driscoll, is a surname.

Driscoll may also refer to:

- Driscoll, North Dakota, United States
- Driscoll, Texas, United States
- Driscoll Independent School District, in Driscoll, Texas, United States
- Driscoll Catholic High School, in Addison, Illinois, United States
- Driscoll's Block, a historic block in Springfield, Massachusetts, United States
- Driscoll Expressway, a proposed highway in New Jersey, United States
- Driscoll Bridge, a toll bridge in New Jersey carrying the Garden State Parkway

== See also ==
- Driscoll's, a producer and distributor of fresh berries
- Driskill (disambiguation)
