= Cutler and Porter Block =

- U.S. National Register of Historic Places
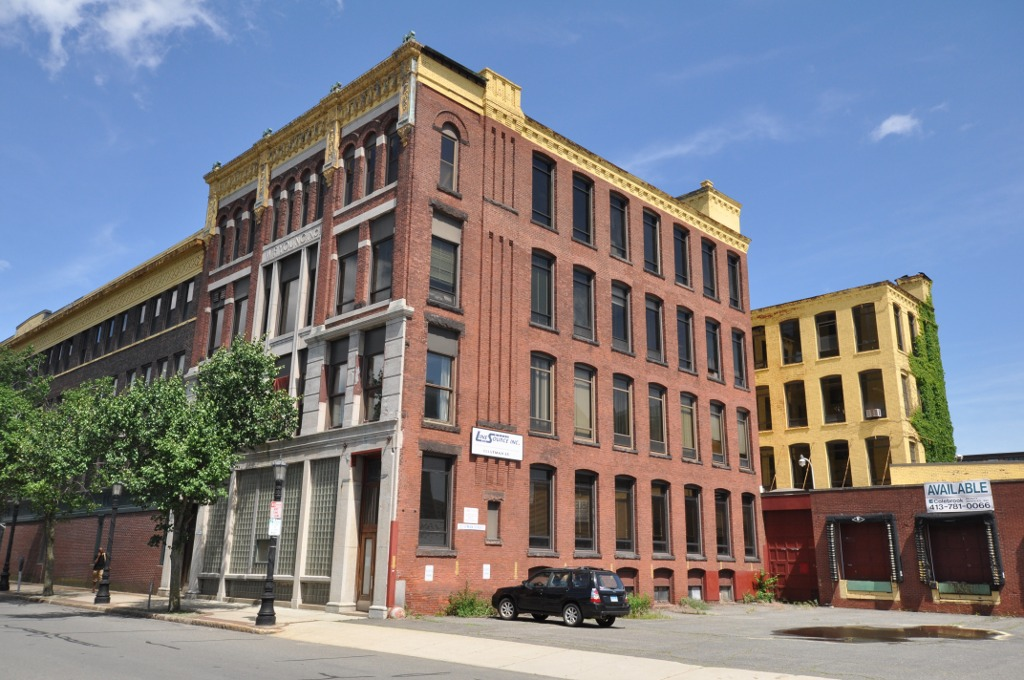

- Location within Massachusetts Location within the United States
- Location: 109 Lyman St., Springfield, Massachusetts
- Coordinates: 42°6′24″N 72°35′31″W
- Area: less than one acre
- Built: 1894
- Architect: Frederick S. Newman
- Architectural style: Panel Brick
- MPS: Downtown Springfield MRA
- NRHP reference No.: 83000744
- Added to NRHP: February 24, 1983

The Cutler and Porter Block was a historic commercial building at 109 Lyman Street in Springfield, Massachusetts. Built in 1894 and altered in 1923, it was an architecturally distinctive example of Panel Brick architecture, with important associations to several late 19th and early 20th-century local businesses. The building was listed on the National Register of Historic Places in 1983.

== Description and history ==
The Cutler and Porter Block was located on the north side of downtown Springfield, on the south side of Lyman Street opposite the Amtrak railyard. It was a brick structure, four stories in height, with an elaborate cornice and parapet on the front, and a slightly less elaborate one on the exposed west side. Top-floor windows were set in round-arch openings in the Romanesque style, while the first two floors were faced in stone, with ground-floor window bays filled with glass blocks.

The four story brick building was constructed in 1894 for the firm of Cutler and Porter Inc, a wholesaler of shoes, boots, and rubber goods, founded in 1880. It was designed by Frederick S. Newman and made to be visually sympathetic to the adjacent Produce Exchange Building. Cutler and Porter occupied the building until 1907. In the 1920s the firm W.F. Young, Inc., founded in Meriden, Connecticut, occupied half of the building, eventually taking it over entirely. Young remodeled the premises to accommodate its business, the production of horse liniments, and made changes to the facade, integrating its logo into the brickwork.

The building was demolished in April 2026.

== See also ==
- National Register of Historic Places listings in Springfield, Massachusetts
- National Register of Historic Places listings in Hampden County, Massachusetts
