= Driskill =

Driskill may refer to:

== People ==
- Clive Driskill-Smith (b. 1978), English organist
- Hope Driskill (b. ?), a contestant on the 2013 American television series Survivor: Caramoan
- Jeff Driskill (b. ? ), American football coach
- Ogden Driskill (b. ? ), American politician in Wyoming
- Travis Driskill (b. 1971), American baseball player
- Walter Driskill (1913 – 1998), American football coach

== Other ==
- The Driskill Hotel, a building in Austin, Texas, United States
- Driskill Mountain, a mountain in Louisiana, United States

== See also ==
- Driscoll (disambiguation)
