= Fuller Block =

- U.S. National Register of Historic Places
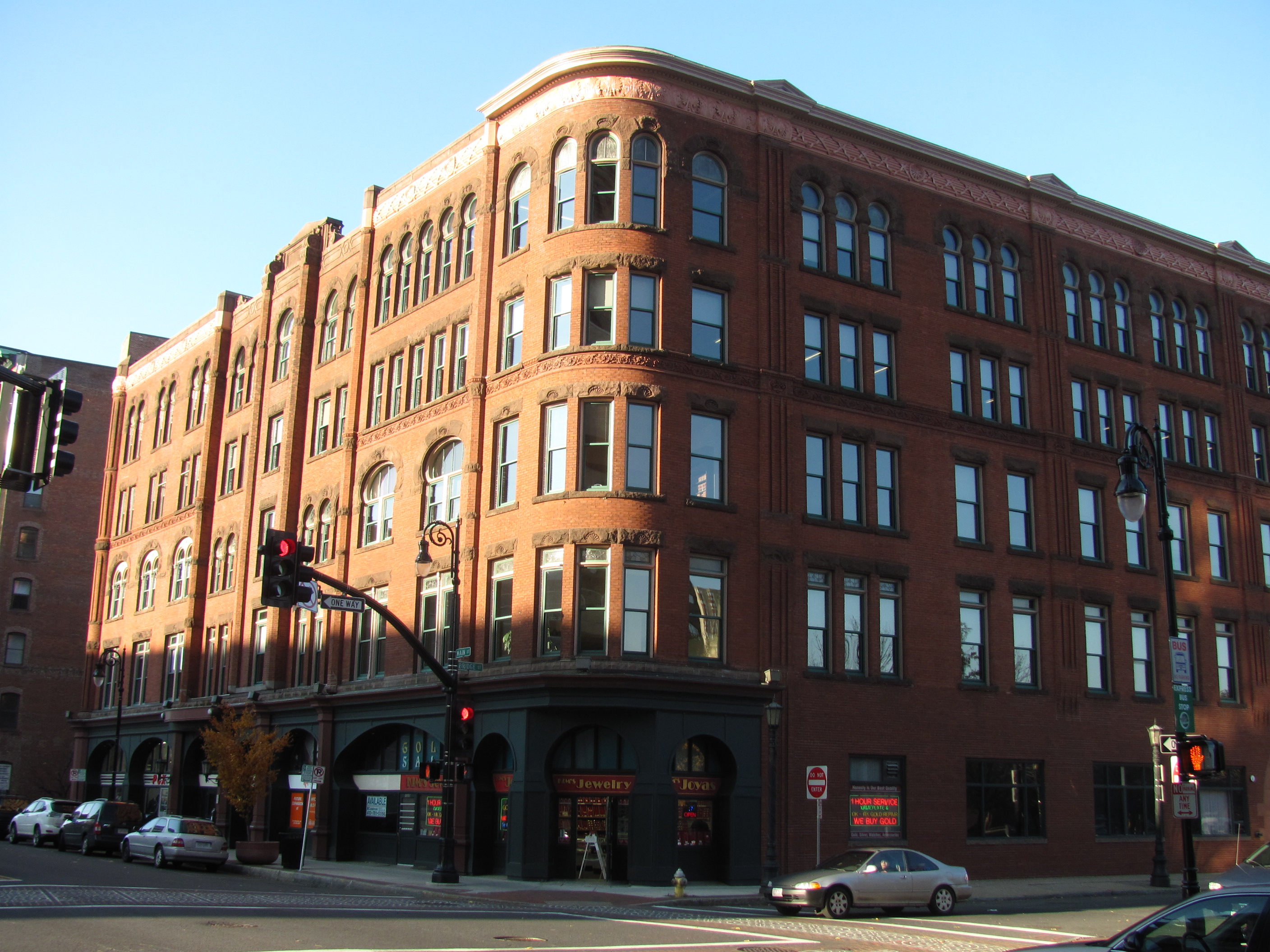
- Fuller Block

- Location within Massachusetts Location within the United States
- Location: Springfield, Massachusetts
- Coordinates: 42°6′12″N 72°35′33″W
- Area: less than one acre
- Built: 1887
- Architect: Frederick S. Newman
- Architectural style: Romanesque
- MPS: Downtown Springfield MRA
- NRHP reference No.: 83000748
- Added to NRHP: February 24, 1983

The Fuller Block is a historic commercial building at 1531-1545 Main Street in Springfield, Massachusetts. Built in 1887, it is a prominent local landmark, and a well-preserved example of a late 19th-century office block. It was listed on the National Register of Historic Places in 1983.

== Description and history ==
The Fuller Block occupies a prominent position in downtown Springfield, at the northwest corner of Main and Bridge Streets. It is five stories in height, with a rounded corner and decoratively parapeted roof edge. The main facade faces Main Street, with bays of varying width on the ground floor, articulated by posts and connected by Moorish arches. A cornice and stone stringcourse separate the first floor from the upper levels. Windows are grouped asymmetrically in pairs, threes, and fives. Windows on the third and fifth floors are generally set in round-arch openings, with some paired windows set in shared stone arches.

The building was built in 1887 for Frank Fuller, a local businessman. The Romanesque Revival structure was designed by architect Frederick S. Newman, and was the first building in Springfield to feature a number of modern amenities and stylistic features: marble staircases, steam heat, passenger elevators, a mail chute, and running water on all floors. The building once featured an onion dome at the corner, but this was removed sometime in the 20th century. Early tenants included prominent local clothiers and doctors. It was listed on the National Register of Historic Places in 1983.

== See also ==
- National Register of Historic Places listings in Springfield, Massachusetts
- National Register of Historic Places listings in Hampden County, Massachusetts
