= Memorial Hall (Windsor Locks, Connecticut) =

- U.S. National Register of Historic Places
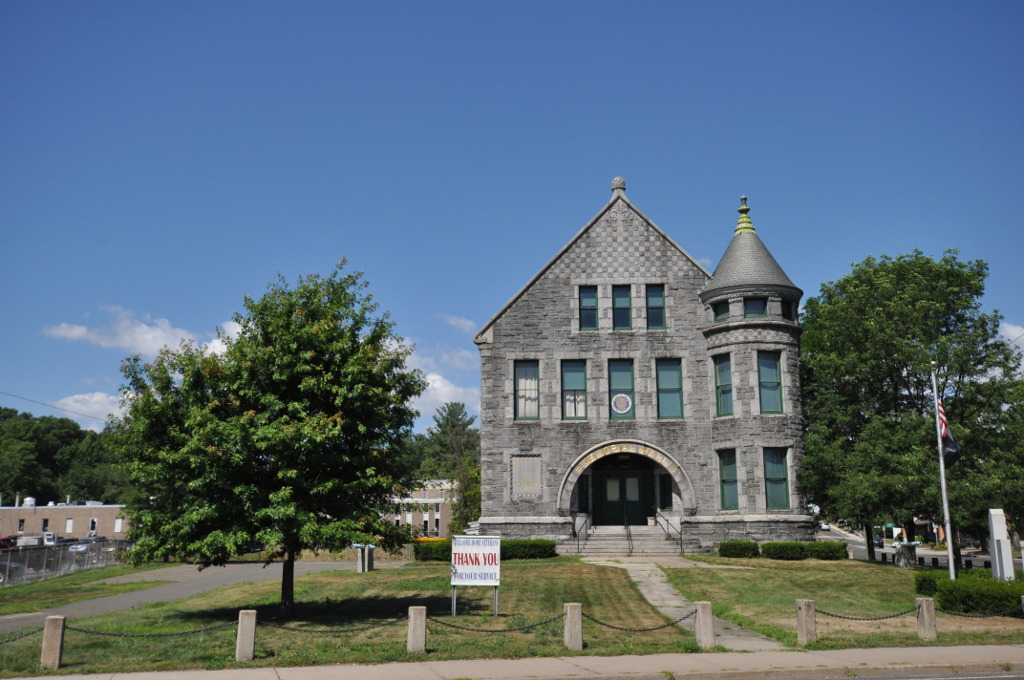

- Location within Connecticut Location within the United States
- Location: Junction of South Main and Elm Streets, Windsor Locks, Connecticut
- Coordinates: 41°55′19″N 72°37′41″W
- Area: less than one acre
- Built: 1890
- Built by: Watson H. Bliss
- Architect: Frederick S. Newman
- Architectural style: Romanesque, Richardsonian Romanesque
- NRHP reference No.: 87000802
- Added to NRHP: June 2, 1987

Memorial Hall is a historic meeting hall at South Main and Elm Streets in Windsor Locks, Connecticut. Built in 1890 as a memorial to the town's American Civil War soldiers, it has served for most of its existence has a meeting place for veterans' organizations, from the Grand Army of the Republic to the American Legion. It is also one of the town's finest examples of Romanesque architecture, and was listed on the National Register of Historic Places in 1987.

== Description and history ==
Memorial Hall is located in the center of Windsor Locks, at the southwest corner of Elm and South Main Streets. It is a three-story stone structure, built out of gray granite in the Richardsonian Romanesque style. It is covered by a gabled roof, and has a round tower at the northeast corner, capped by a conical roof. The main facade is dominated by a round arch on the ground floor under which the main entrance is located. The second floor has four sash windows in rectangular openings, and the third has three closely set windows in the roof gable. In the interior, the ground floor has a stairwell on the left, and a central hall flanked by meeting rooms. The tower chamber was originally used as a library. The second floor houses the building's main meeting hall.

The hall was built in 1888 to a design by Frederick S. Newman of Springfield, Massachusetts. The building was donated by Charles Chaffee, a mill owner from Monson, Massachusetts whose reason for the donation is not known. The building was constructed out of stone quarried in Monson as a memorial to Windsor Locks' Civil War soldiers, and was intended for use by the Grand Army of the Republic and affiliated organizations. It has been maintained by the nearby Congregational church, under a unique preservation restriction placed at the time of its construction requiring its continued use as a space for current and past soldiers. This restriction prevented its repurposing as town hall after World War II, by which time the GAR chapter had closed, and the church had taken over the building ownership. It is now used by a variety of veterans organizations.

== See also ==
- National Register of Historic Places listings in Hartford County, Connecticut
