= Produce Exchange Building =

- U.S. National Register of Historic Places
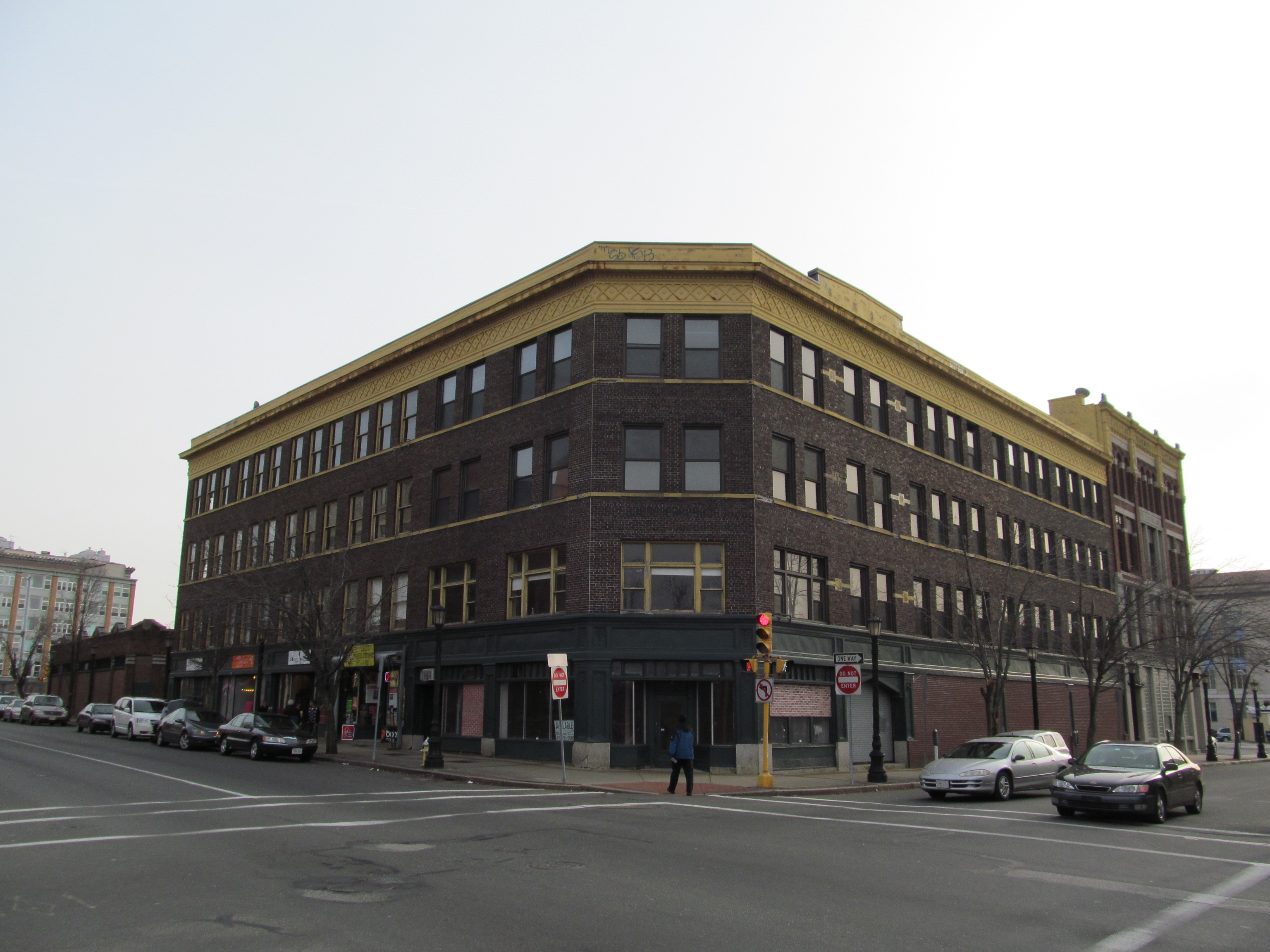
- Produce Exchange Building

- Location within Massachusetts Location within the United States
- Location: 194-206 Chestnut St., 115-125 Lyman St., Springfield, Massachusetts
- Coordinates: 42°6′25″N 72°35′30″W
- Area: less than one acre
- Built: 1899
- MPS: Downtown Springfield MRA
- NRHP reference No.: 83000761
- Added to NRHP: February 24, 1983

The Produce Exchange Building was a historic commercial building at 194–206 Chestnut and 115–125 Lyman Street in downtown Springfield, Massachusetts. Built in 1899 and remodeled in 1926, it was one of the largest of Springfield's early 20th-century commercial buildings, used for many years as a wholesale produce market. It was listed on the National Register of Historic Places in 1983.

== Description and history ==
The Produce Exchange Building was located on the north side of downtown Springfield, across Lyman Street from the main railroad line and at the corner of Chestnut Street. It was an L-shaped four-story masonry structure, finished in brick with terra cotta trim. It had sixteen-bay facades facing both streets, and a two-bay corner facade housing the main building entrance on the ground floor. The Chestnut Street facade had five retail storefronts, each with recessed entrances and display windows, separated by pilasters and topped by a frieze band and cornice. The Lyman Street facade had mostly bricked over retail bays, separated by pilasters. The upper floor had a combination of sash windows and three-part picture windows, and had a decorated frieze below a simple cornice at the top.

The block was built in 1899 by Andrew Whitney, and began to serve as the city's wholesale produce exchange marketplace in 1908, a role it served for many years. In 1926 the building was extensively remodeled, including an updated facade, which had survived largely intact. The building was one of the largest commercial buildings of the period in the city.

The building was demolished in April 2026.

== See also ==
- Cutler and Porter Block, 109 Lyman Street
- National Register of Historic Places listings in Springfield, Massachusetts
- National Register of Historic Places listings in Hampden County, Massachusetts
