= Driscoll's Block =

- U.S. National Register of Historic Places
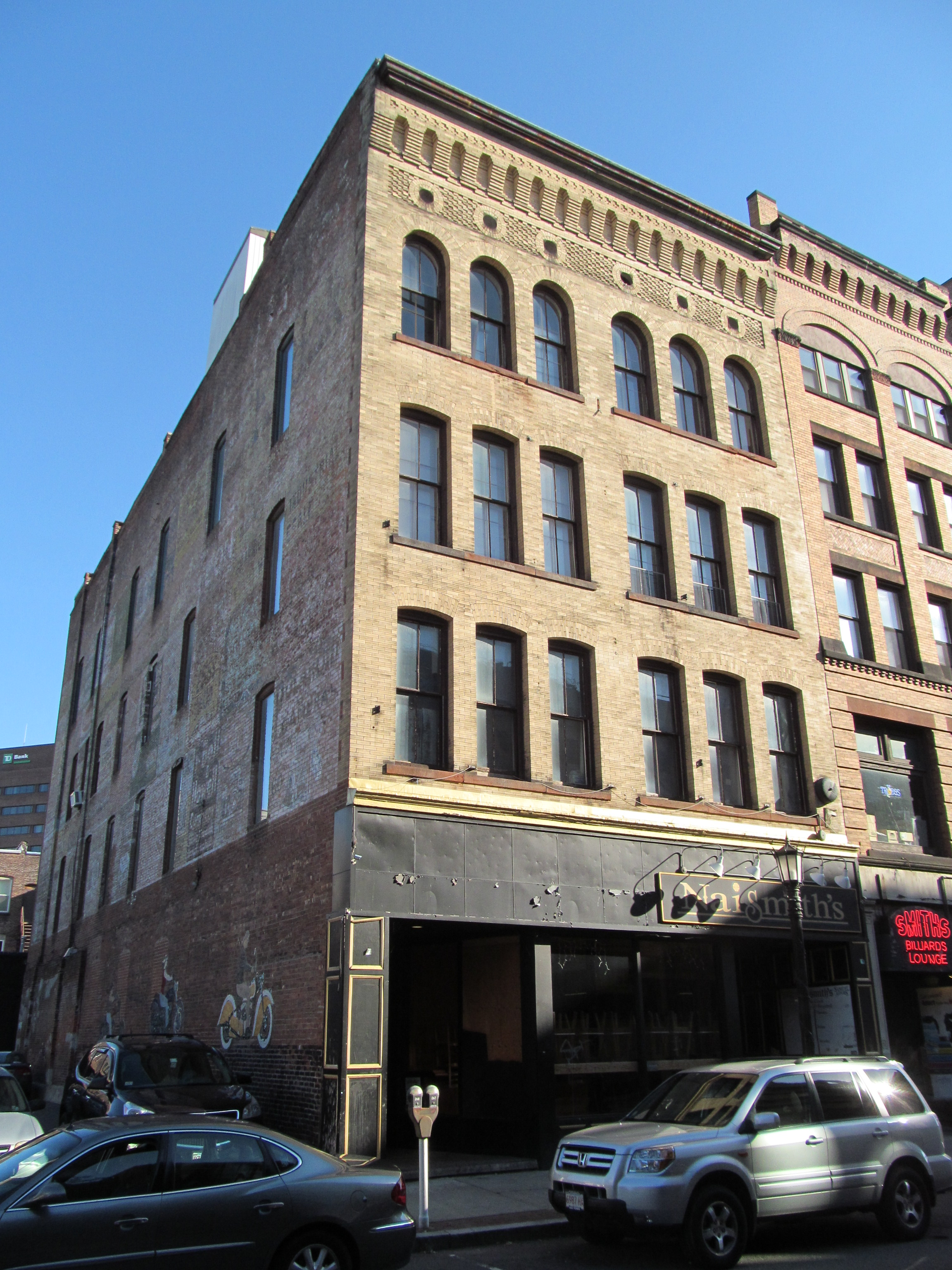
- Driscoll's Block

- Location within Massachusetts Location within the United States
- Location: Springfield, Massachusetts
- Coordinates: 42°6′14″N 72°35′33″W
- Area: less than one acre
- Built: 1894
- Architectural style: Romanesque
- MPS: Downtown Springfield MRA
- NRHP reference No.: 83000746
- Added to NRHP: February 24, 1983

Driscoll's Block is a historic commercial building at 211-13 Worthington Street in Springfield, Massachusetts. Built in 1894, it was the first building to be built in the area after a fire destroyed five blocks of Worthington Street the previous year. It was listed on the National Register of Historic Places in 1983.

== Description and history ==
Driscoll's Block is located in downtown Springfield, on the southeast side of Worthington Street, just southwest of Stearns Square. It is a modest four-story brick building, with a flat roof and decorative corbelled brick cornice. The ground floor houses a single store front, with recessed entrances (one to the retail space and the other to the upstairs) flanking a display window. Windows on the second and third floors are set in segmented-arch openings, in two groups of three with shared sills. Fourth-floor windows are similarly arranged, but are set in round-arch openings. The exterior of the building was, at the time of its nomination to the National Register of Historic Places in 1983, notable for a series of mid-20th-century advertising stencils that were applied to its eastern facade after the 1940 demolition of the adjacent building. Those advertisements have since faded significantly. In 2022 City Mosaic of Springfield, Massachusetts was approached by State Representative Sean Curran to paint a mural on Driscoll's Block. Instead of painting a new mural the artists decided to bring the previous mural back to life. In late August 2022, the mural was revealed as a stunning four-story piece of art with historical advertisements.

The block was built for J.R. Driscoll, and at first housed a bowling alley. This business ran until 1915, and was followed by a succession of tenants, including briefly a Sears and Roebuck branch. The tenants have principally been manufacturing or warehousing concerns.

== See also ==
- National Register of Historic Places listings in Springfield, Massachusetts
- National Register of Historic Places listings in Hampden County, Massachusetts
