= Polish National Home =

Polish National Home may refer to:

- Polish National Home (Hartford, Connecticut), listed on the National Register of Historic Places in Hartford County, Connecticut
- Polish National Home (Chicopee, Massachusetts), listed on the National Register of Historic Places in Hampden County, Massachusetts
