= Essex Street Historic District =

Historic district in Massachusetts, United States

- U.S. National Register of Historic Places
- U.S. Historic district
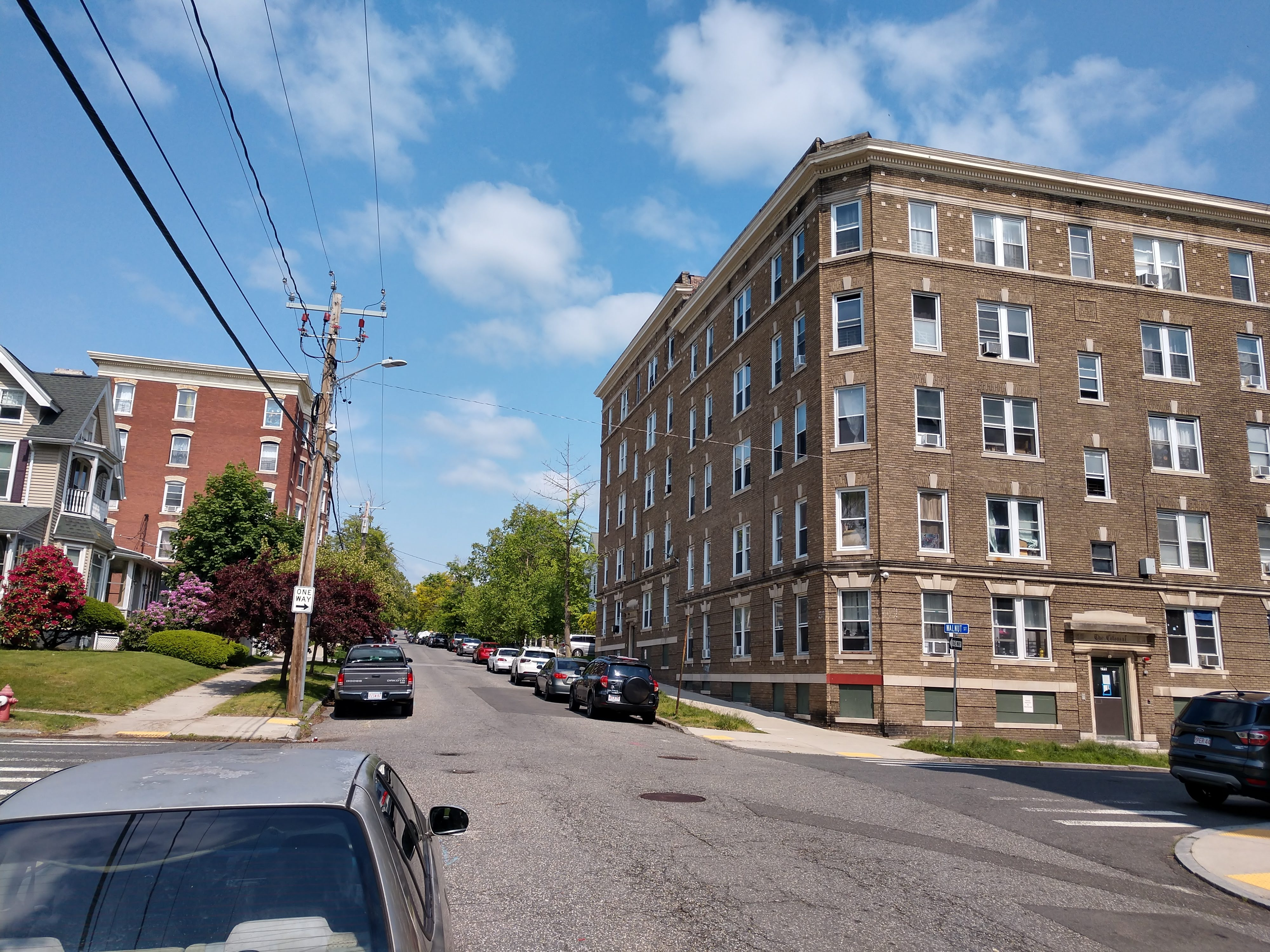

- Location within Massachusetts Location within the United States
- Location: Roughly Essex Street between Chestnut and Pine Streets, Holyoke, Massachusetts
- Coordinates: 42°12′19″N 72°36′50″W
- Area: 4.9 acres (2.0 ha)
- Built: 1870
- NRHP reference No.: 100008035
- Added to NRHP: April 7, 2023

The Essex Street Historic District is a residential historic district in Holyoke, Massachusetts. It runs along Essex Street between Chestnut and Pine Streets, with additional properties on the adjacent side streets. It contains a diversity of housing representative of styles covering a century of development in the area. The district was listed on the National Register of Historic Places in 2023.

== Description and history ==
Holyoke's Essex Street Historic District is located a short way west of the city's downtown, occupying 4.9 acres (2.0 ha) centered on a three-block stretch of Essex Street. It is bounded on the northwest by Pine Street and Chestnut Street to the southeast, extending to including properties on Walnut and Elm Streets adjacent to Essex. The district is architecturally diverse, including single-family homes on small lots, rowhouses, smaller multiunit (two and three-family) houses, and larger apartment blocks. The oldest building in the district is the Italianate Newton House on Elm Street, built c. 1877. The district is dominated by several multistory brick apartment blocks dating to the early 20th century. Also of interest are brick rowhouses lining part of Walnut Street, which date to the 1880s and have Queen Anne styling.

Essex Street was laid out by 1870, but was not immediately developed. Its first phase of development was the construction of larger single-family houses such as the Newton House, built for executives of Holyoke's industrial concerns and local small-business owners in the 1870s. Density of housing soon increased, with the construction of the rowhouses on Walnut Street, and the first multistory apartment block in 1888. Development intensified in the early 20th century, when some of the larger homes were demolished to facilitate construction of more apartment blocks. By the mid-20th century, most of the single-family home had been converted to multifamily use.

== See also ==
- National Register of Historic Places listings in Hampden County, Massachusetts
