= National Register of Historic Places listings in Hampden County, Massachusetts =

Location of Hampden County in Massachusetts

This is a list of the National Register of Historic Places listings in Hampden County, Massachusetts.

This is a list of the properties and districts on the National Register of Historic Places in Hampden County, Massachusetts, United States. Latitude and longitude coordinates are provided for many National Register properties and districts; these locations may be seen together in a map.

There are 172 properties and districts listed on the National Register in the county, including 3 National Historic Landmarks. The city of Springfield is the location of 92 of these properties and districts, including 1 of the National Historic Landmarks; they are listed separately, while the remaining 80 properties and districts, including 2 National Historic Landmarks, are listed here.

Contents: Counties in Massachusetts

Barnstable | Berkshire | Bristol | Dukes | Essex | Franklin | Hampden | Hampshire | Middlesex | Nantucket | Norfolk | Plymouth | Suffolk | Worcester

This National Park Service list is complete through NPS recent listings posted November 6, 2026.

== Current listings ==
=== Outside Springfield ===
	Name on the Register	Image	Date listed	Location	City or town	Description
1	Academy Historic District	Academy Historic District	April 20, 1979 (#79000351)	Mountain Rd., Main and Faculty Sts. 42°07′29″N 72°25′56″W	Wilbraham	
2	Agawam Center Historic District	Agawam Center Historic District	June 21, 2001 (#01000670)	24-196 Elm St.; 551-1008 Main St. 42°04′00″N 72°37′05″W	Agawam	
3	Al's Diner	Al's Diner	December 14, 2000 (#00001482)	14 Yelle St. 42°11′30″N 72°35′58″W	Chicopee	part of the Diners of Massachusetts Multiple Property Submission (MPS)
4	Ames Manufacturing Company	Ames Manufacturing Company	June 23, 1983 (#83000734)	5-7 Springfield St. 42°08′57″N 72°36′24″W	Chicopee	
5	Belcher School		October 29, 2026 (#100013553)	10 Southwick Street; 42°09′15″N 72°34′31″W	Chicopee	
5	Edward Bellamy House	Edward Bellamy House	November 11, 1971 (#71000091)	91-93 Church St. 42°09′21″N 72°35′04″W	Chicopee	
6	Brimfield Center Historic District	Brimfield Center Historic District	June 22, 2006 (#06000524)	Main St., Brookfled, Wales, Sturbridge and Warren Rds. 42°07′29″N 72°18′32″W	Brimfield	
7	Thornton W. Burgess House	Thornton W. Burgess House	April 21, 1983 (#83000740)	789 Main St. 42°03′48″N 72°24′24″W	Hampden	
8	Elijah Burt House	Elijah Burt House	April 26, 1976 (#76000240)	201 Chestnut St. 42°03′15″N 72°30′54″W	East Longmeadow	
9	Cabotville Common Historic District	Cabotville Common Historic District	May 28, 1999 (#99000558)	School, Chestnut, Park and West Sts. 42°08′42″N 72°36′42″W	Chicopee	
10	Caledonia Building	Caledonia Building	July 3, 1979 (#79000346)	185-193 High St. 42°12′27″N 72°36′27″W	Holyoke	
11	Carreau Block	Carreau Block	August 6, 1998 (#98000993)	640-642 Chicopee St. 42°11′05″N 72°36′41″W	Chicopee	
12	Central Churchill Historic District	Central Churchill Historic District	July 8, 2024 (#100010564)	Roughly bounded by Chestnut, Franklin, High, and Sargeant streets 42°12′01″N 72°36′56″W	Holyoke	
13	Chapin School	Chapin School	July 5, 2016 (#16000424)	40 Meadow St. 42°11′05″N 72°36′36″W	Chicopee	
14	Chester Center Historic District	Chester Center Historic District	February 25, 1988 (#88000161)	Skyline Trail at intersection of Bromley and Lyman Rds. 42°17′26″N 72°55′27″W	Chester	
15	Chester Factory Village Historic District	Chester Factory Village Historic District	March 16, 1989 (#89000145)	Roughly bounded by Middlefield Rd., River, Main, and Maple Sts., US 20, and Williams St. 42°16′52″N 72°58′54″W	Chester	
16	City Hall	City Hall	July 30, 1974 (#74002052)	Market Sq. 42°08′55″N 72°36′52″W	Chicopee	
17	Josiah Day House	Josiah Day House	April 16, 1975 (#75000265)	70 Park St. 42°06′25″N 72°37′08″W	West Springfield	
18	Joseph Dewey House	Joseph Dewey House	July 27, 2001 (#01000746)	87 S. Maple St. 42°06′42″N 72°45′49″W	Westfield	
19	Dwight Manufacturing Company Housing District	Dwight Manufacturing Company Housing District	June 3, 1977 (#77000173)	Front, Depot, Dwight, Exchange, Chestnut Sts. 42°08′48″N 72°36′44″W	Chicopee	
20	Essex Street Historic District	Essex Street Historic District	April 7, 2023 (#100008035)	Roughly bounded by Chestnut, Essex, and Pine Sts. 42°12′19″N 72°36′50″W	Holyoke	
21	Farr Alpaca Company Mills #1 and #3 Historic District		February 13, 2026 (#100012702)	0 and 216 Appleton Street, 1 Bigelow Street, 101 and 108 Cabot Street, 0 Rear Nick Cosmos Way; 42°12′11″N 72°36′25″W	Holyoke	
22	First Congregational Church of Blandford	First Congregational Church of Blandford	October 24, 1985 (#85003371)	North St. 42°10′55″N 72°55′45″W	Blandford	
23	First Congregational Church of East Longmeadow	First Congregational Church of East Longmeadow	January 3, 1978 (#78000444)	7 Somers Rd. 42°03′51″N 72°30′46″W	East Longmeadow	
24	Friedrich Block	Friedrich Block	December 5, 2002 (#02001473)	449-461 Main St. 42°11′52″N 72°36′36″W	Holyoke	
25	Granville Center Historic District	Granville Center Historic District	November 5, 1991 (#91001587)	Main Rd. 42°04′02″N 72°52′33″W	Granville	
26	Granville Village Historic District	Granville Village Historic District	November 5, 1991 (#91001588)	Roughly, area around the junction of Maple St. and Main and Granby Rds., including part of Water St. 42°03′54″N 72°51′49″W	Granville	
27	Hadley Falls Company Housing District	Hadley Falls Company Housing District	November 9, 1972 (#72000133)	Center, N. Canal, Grover, and Lyman Sts. 42°12′27″N 72°35′55″W	Holyoke	
28	Hampden County Training School	Hampden County Training School	August 16, 2018 (#100002781)	702 S Westfield St. 42°02′39″N 72°40′21″W	Agawam	
29	Hampden Park Historic District	Hampden Park Historic District	September 10, 2012 (#12000781)	Roughly bounded by Hampden, Chestnut, Maple, & Dwight Sts. 42°12′30″N 72°36′30″W	Holyoke	
30	Holyoke Canal System	Holyoke Canal System	December 3, 1980 (#80000473)	Front and South Sts. and the Connecticut River; 42°12′06″N 72°36′21″W	Holyoke	
31	Holyoke City Hall	Holyoke City Hall	December 6, 1975 (#75000259)	536 Dwight St. 42°12′23″N 72°36′28″W	Holyoke	
32	Laflin-Phelps Homestead	Laflin-Phelps Homestead	December 6, 2005 (#05001371)	20 Depot St. 42°03′14″N 72°46′02″W	Southwick	
33	Landlord Fowler Tavern	Landlord Fowler Tavern	August 11, 1982 (#82001914)	171 Main St. 42°07′03″N 72°44′10″W	Westfield	
34	Capt. Charles Leonard House	Capt. Charles Leonard House	March 10, 1975 (#75000273)	663 Main St. 42°04′14″N 72°36′53″W	Agawam	
35	Longmeadow Historic District	Longmeadow Historic District	November 12, 1982 (#82000490)	Roughly Longmeadow St. from Birdie Rd. to Wheelmeadow Brook; 42°02′57″N 72°34′59″W	Longmeadow	
36	Longmeadow Street-North Historic District	Longmeadow Street-North Historic District	October 28, 1994 (#94001262)	Bounded by Longmeadow St., Springfield Town Line, Westmoreland Ave. and Colley Dr. 42°04′01″N 72°34′41″W	Longmeadow	
37	Ludlow Center Historic District	Ludlow Center Historic District	October 21, 1988 (#88001999)	Along Center, Church and Booth Sts. 42°11′31″N 72°27′35″W	Ludlow	
38	Ludlow Village Historic District	Ludlow Village Historic District	February 22, 1993 (#93000009)	Roughly bounded by Winsor, Sewall and State Sts. and the Chicopee River, and crossing the Chicopee, above Red Bridge Rd. 42°09′55″N 72°26′32″W	Ludlow	
39	Maplewood Hotel	Maplewood Hotel	November 10, 1983 (#83003980)	328-330 Maple St. 42°12′13″N 72°36′44″W	Holyoke	
40	Mechanic Street Cemetery	Mechanic Street Cemetery	June 26, 2002 (#02000632)	Mechanic St. 42°07′23″N 72°44′41″W	Westfield	
41	Memorial Town Hall	Memorial Town Hall	May 17, 1984 (#84002449)	Main St. 42°05′51″N 72°18′48″W	Monson	
42	Middlefield-Becket Stone Arch Railroad Bridge District	Middlefield-Becket Stone Arch Railroad Bridge District	April 11, 1980 (#80000502)	Middlefield vicinity 42°18′44″N 73°01′10″W	Chester	Extends into Middlefield and Becket.
43	Monson Center Historic District	Monson Center Historic District	May 6, 1991 (#90000788)	Main and Cushman Streets; 42°05′53″N 72°18′50″W	Monson	
44	Monson Developmental Center	Monson Developmental Center	January 21, 1994 (#93001483)	200 State Ave. 42°08′43″N 72°20′04″W	Monson	
45	Moseley School	Moseley School	September 4, 2020 (#100005525)	25 Dartmouth St. 42°07′57″N 72°44′22″W	Westfield	
46	William Norcross House	William Norcross House	March 29, 1984 (#84002450)	14 Cushman St. 42°05′56″N 72°18′47″W	Monson	
47	North Chester Historic District	North Chester Historic District	December 6, 1996 (#96001465)	Roughly bounded by E. River, Smith, and N. Chester Rds. 42°19′35″N 72°55′53″W	Chester	
48	North High Street Historic District	North High Street Historic District	June 26, 1986 (#86001376)	High St. between Dwight and Lyman Sts.; also 233-411 High St.; also 580 Dwight St. and 230, 234, and 236 Maple St. 42°12′29″N 72°36′26″W	Holyoke	Second and third sets of boundaries represent boundary increases of December 24, 1992 and September 12, 2008, respectively
49	Octagon House	Octagon House	April 1, 1982 (#82004967)	28 King St. 42°07′17″N 72°45′19″W	Westfield	
50	Our Mother of Sorrows Monastery and Retreat Center	Our Mother of Sorrows Monastery and Retreat Center	August 30, 2002 (#02000904)	110 Monastery Ave. 42°07′07″N 72°37′57″W	West Springfield	Now a senior housing facility.
51	Thomas D. Page House	Thomas D. Page House	October 25, 1988 (#87001782)	105 East St. 42°09′22″N 72°34′39″W	Chicopee	
52	Palmer Memorial Hall	Palmer Memorial Hall	September 3, 1999 (#99001082)	1029 Central St. 42°09′23″N 72°19′39″W	Palmer	
53	Polish National Home	Polish National Home	November 14, 1980 (#80000475)	136-144 Cabot St. 42°08′41″N 72°36′35″W	Chicopee	
54	Prospect Hill School	Prospect Hill School	November 19, 2008 (#08001069)	33 Montgomery St. 42°08′03″N 72°44′46″W	Westfield	
55	Prospect Park	Prospect Park	September 10, 2004 (#04000931)	Maple St., Arbor Way, and the Connecticut River; 42°12′43″N 72°36′21″W	Holyoke	Now called Pulaski Park
56	Purchase-Ferre House	Purchase-Ferre House	November 29, 1990 (#90001805)	1289 Main St. 42°02′58″N 72°36′58″W	Agawam	
57	Clovis Robert Block	Clovis Robert Block	December 5, 2002 (#02001472)	338-348 Main St. 42°11′59″N 72°36′28″W	Holyoke	
58	John and Ruth Rose House	John and Ruth Rose House	August 10, 2018 (#100002772)	944 Main Rd. 42°04′22″N 72°54′03″W	Granville	
59	Russell Center Historic District	Russell Center Historic District	December 27, 1996 (#96001524)	Junction of Main and Lincoln Ave. 42°11′22″N 72°51′24″W	Russell	
60	Sanford Whip Factory	Sanford Whip Factory	December 10, 2008 (#08001176)	330 Elm St. 42°07′39″N 72°44′50″W	Westfield	
61	School Street Barn	School Street Barn	September 10, 2012 (#12000782)	551 School St. 42°04′27″N 72°35′34″W	Agawam	
62	Thomas and Esther Smith House	Thomas and Esther Smith House	June 2, 2005 (#05000217)	251 North West St. 42°04′31″N 72°41′44″W	Agawam	
63	Springfield Street Historic District	Springfield Street Historic District	January 25, 1991 (#90002217)	Roughly bounded by Springfield St., Gaylord St. and Fairview Ave. 42°08′38″N 72°36′14″W	Chicopee	
64	State Normal Training School	State Normal Training School	July 7, 1983 (#83000769)	27 Washington St. 42°07′20″N 72°45′06″W	Westfield	
65	Swetland-Pease House	Swetland-Pease House	April 9, 1980 (#80000505)	Southeast of East Longmeadow at 191 Pease Rd. 42°02′38″N 72°29′41″W	East Longmeadow	
66	Jacob Thompson House	Jacob Thompson House	March 13, 2020 (#100005078)	7 Main St. 42°06′31″N 72°18′59″W	Monson	
67	Union Station	Union Station	June 9, 1988 (#88000715)	Depot St. 42°09′20″N 72°19′47″W	Palmer	
68	United States Whip Company Complex	United States Whip Company Complex	November 29, 1983 (#83003983)	24 Main St. 42°07′12″N 72°44′53″W	Westfield	
69	US Post Office-Holyoke Main	US Post Office-Holyoke Main	January 21, 1986 (#86000122)	650 Dwight St. 42°12′29″N 72°36′38″W	Holyoke	
70	US Post Office-Palmer Main	US Post Office-Palmer Main	December 12, 1985 (#85003336)	Park and Central Sts. 42°09′28″N 72°19′39″W	Palmer	
71	Valentine School	Valentine School	September 16, 1983 (#83000774)	Grape and Elm Sts. 42°08′46″N 72°36′12″W	Chicopee	
72	H. M. Van Deusen Whip Company	H. M. Van Deusen Whip Company	February 18, 1987 (#87000037)	42 Arnold St. 42°07′22″N 72°45′03″W	Westfield	
73	War Memorial Building	War Memorial Building	May 2, 2022 (#100007663)	310 Appleton St. 42°12′19″N 72°36′39″W	Holyoke	
74	West Granville Historic District	West Granville Historic District	November 5, 1991 (#91001589)	Roughly, Main Rd. from west of Beach Hill Rd. to South Ln. No. 2; 42°04′39″N 72°56′18″W	Granville	
75	Western Railroad Stone Arch Bridges and Chester Factory Village Depot	Western Railroad Stone Arch Bridges and Chester Factory Village Depot	January 13, 2021 (#100006273)	Vicinity of Herbert Cross Road, Middlefield/Becket Line (Bridges and Roadbed); 10 Prospect Street (Depot); 42°16′49″N 72°58′42″W	Chester	Extends into Becket and Middlefield; includes a subset of the Middlefield-Becket Stone Arch Railroad Bridge District.
76	Westfield Center Historic District	Westfield Center Historic District	June 25, 2013 (#13000441)	0-362 Elm Street, 2-86 Broad Street, 0-83 Court Street, 2-24 Main Street, 0-71 North Elm Street, Chestnut Street on the west, West Silver Street on the South, Union Street on the north 42°07′22″N 72°44′55″W	Westfield	Expansion and rename of Westfield Center Commercial Historic District
77	Westfield Municipal Building	Westfield Municipal Building	March 8, 1978 (#78000449)	59 Court St. 42°07′12″N 72°45′01″W	Westfield	430 buildings, 39 sites, 14 structures, and 19 objects.
78	Westfield Whip Manufacturing Company	Westfield Whip Manufacturing Company	October 17, 1985 (#85003233)	360 Elm St. 42°07′41″N 72°44′50″W	Westfield	
79	Wistariahurst	Wistariahurst	April 23, 1973 (#73000295)	238 Cabot St. 42°12′17″N 72°37′04″W	Holyoke	

== Former listing ==
	Name on the Register	Image	Date listed	Date removed	Location	City or town	Description
1	Kendall Block		June 26, 1976 (#76002293)	August 1, 1978	6-20 Springfield St.	Chicopee	Also known as the Market Street Hotel. During consideration for addition to the Register, the Hotel suffered a fire that destroyed the top two floors. The site was eventually added to the Register, but was subsequently removed after losing its historic characteristics.

== See also ==
- List of National Historic Landmarks in Massachusetts
- National Register of Historic Places listings in Massachusetts
