= Our Mother of Sorrows Monastery and Retreat Center (West Springfield, Massachusetts) =

- U.S. National Register of Historic Places
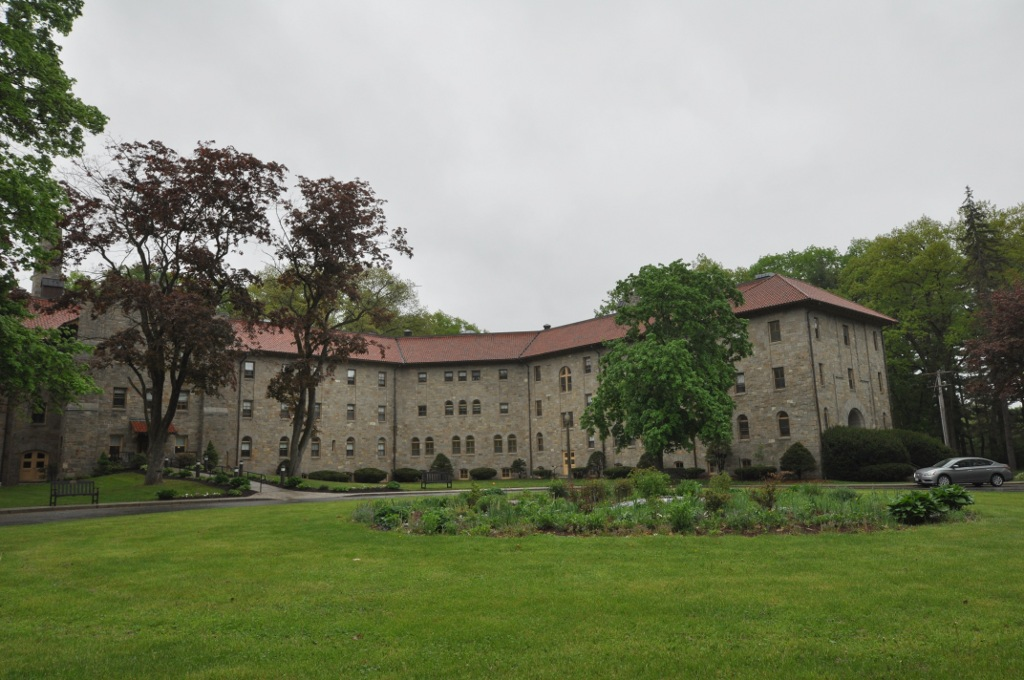

- Location within Massachusetts Location within the United States
- Location: West Springfield, Massachusetts
- Coordinates: 42°7′7″N 72°37′57″W
- Architect: Comes, Perry, and McMullin
- Architectural style: Mission/Spanish Revival
- NRHP reference No.: 02000904
- Added to NRHP: August 30, 2002

Our Mother of Sorrows Monastery and Retreat Center is an historic Passionist monastery at 110 Monastery Avenue in West Springfield, Massachusetts. The Spanish Colonial Revival building on the campus (construction begun in 1925) is the only structure of its type in the city, was the first monastery established in western Massachusetts. It was enlarged in 1955, and served as a Roman Catholic monastery, retreat, and outreach center until 1993. It has since been converted into a senior living facility, and was listed on the National Register of Historic Places in 2002.

== Description and history ==
The former Our Mother of Sorrows Monastery and Retreat Center is located in a residential area north of downtown West Springfield, on more than 18 acres (7.3 ha) of landscaped grounds on the north side of Monastery Street. The main building is a large five-section masonry structure with Spanish Colonial Revival styling. It has a steel frame, and its exterior is finished in brick and ashlar granite. First-floor window and door openings generally have rounded arches, while upper-floor windows are sash set in rectangular openings. It is covered by a red tile hip roof. Three of the five wings have more elaborate styling; these are the oldest section of the building, while the left wings, which give the building a general C shape, were added in 1955.

The Passionist Order is a Roman Catholic fraternity founded in 1720 in what is now Italy. By the early 19th century, it had spread to English-speaking countries, and by 1852 it had reached the United States. The Catholic population of Massachusetts, small in the early 19th century, grew substantially due to immigration from Ireland and Quebec. The first Passionist monastery was established in Boston, and in 1922 members of the order proposed establishing one in western Massachusetts. This property was built in 1923 to a design by John T. Comes of Pittsburgh, Pennsylvania, who had designed a retreat for the Passionists there. The building is the largest example of Spanish colonial architecture in the region.

The monastery performed three principal functions during its period of operation (1923-1993). It provided a place for the contemplative life of order members, who followed rigidly prescribed patterns of life focused on work and prayer. It provided a retreat space for priests engaged in outreach throughout the region, and as a training ground for future priests and monks. In its later years it expanded to offer weekend retreats to lay people as well. The monastery operated as a nearly self-sufficient entity, raising most of its own food on garden plots on the grounds, and also housed a small infirmary where sick members not requiring hospitalization could be treated.

The popularity of its retreat offerings declined in the second half of the 20th century, and the monastery population also began to shrink and age. In 1990, the facility opened its doors as an elder housing facility operated by the order, but was then shut down in 1993, its religious functions dispersed to other locations. The building subsequently underwent a certified historic rehabilitation, and now functions as an assisted living facility.

== See also ==
- National Register of Historic Places listings in Hampden County, Massachusetts
