= Palmer Memorial Hall =

- U.S. National Register of Historic Places
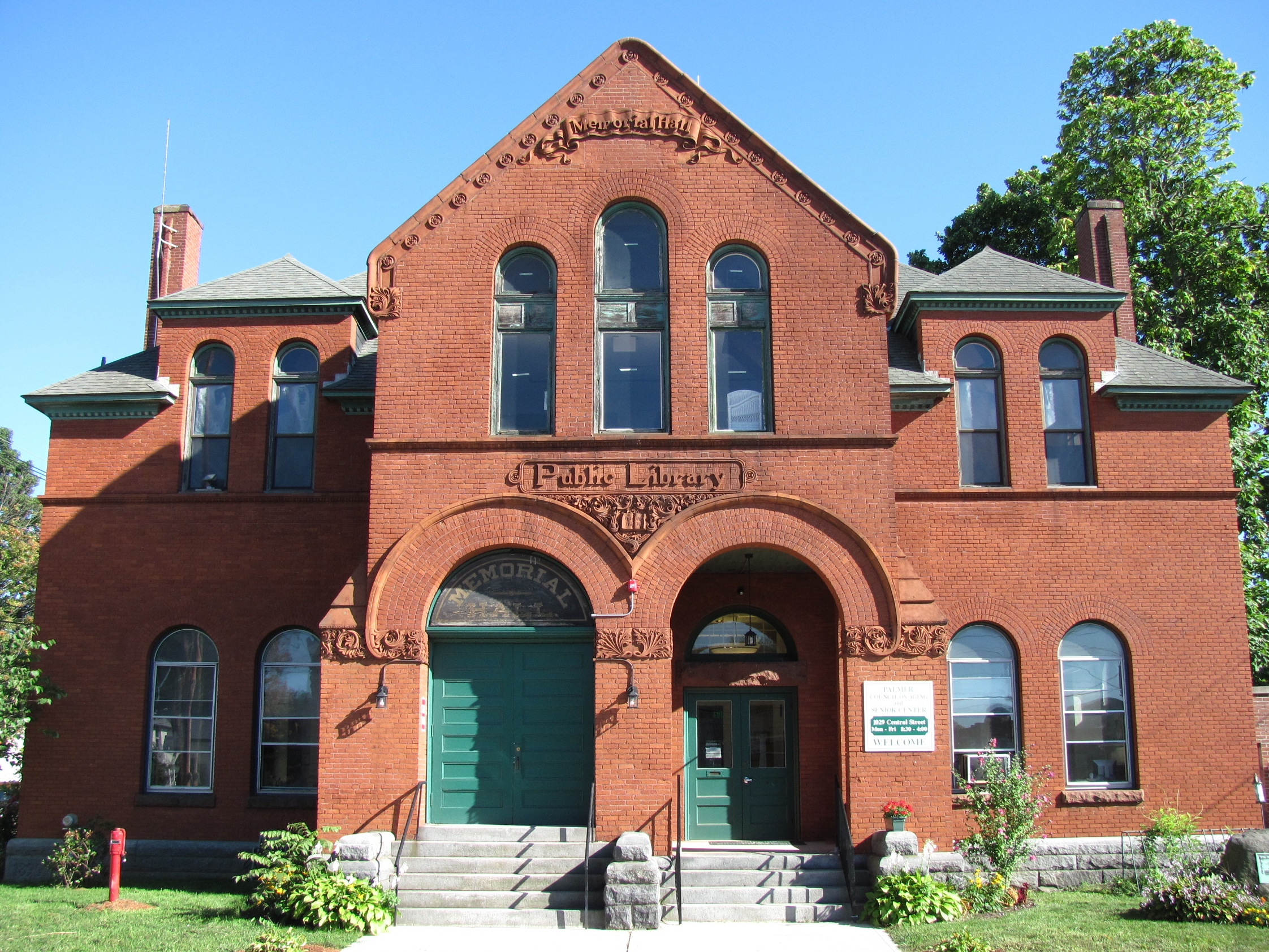
- Memorial Hall

- Location within Massachusetts Location within the United States
- Location: Palmer, Massachusetts
- Coordinates: 42°09′24″N 72°19′38″W
- Built: 1890
- Architect: Robertson, Robert H.; Flynt Building and Construction Comp
- Architectural style: Romanesque
- NRHP reference No.: 99001082
- Added to NRHP: September 3, 1999

Palmer Memorial Hall is a historic hall at 1029 Central Street in Palmer, Massachusetts, United States. The Romanesque building was designed by New York City architect R. H. Robertson and constructed in 1890 as a memorial to the town's Civil War dead; it was also used as a meeting space by the local Grand Army of the Republic veterans society. The ground floor served as the town's public library until 1977. It has since served as Palmer's Senior Center. The building was listed on the National Register of Historic Places in 1999.

== Description and history ==
Palmer Memorial Hall is located one block off Palmer's downtown Main Street, at the southeast corner of Pleasant and Central Streets. it is a 1-1/2 story red brick building, with a red brick exterior, hip roof, and granite foundation. The front facade is dominated by a projecting gabled pavilion, which houses the main entrances in a pair of similar round-arch recesses with terra cotta decorative elements. Above these in the gable are three tall round-arch windows. The pavilion is flanked on each side by two round-arch windows, above which hip-roof wall dormers rise through the main roof. The building interior was designed for use as a library on the ground floor, and a meeting space on the second floor.

The hall was designed by Robert H. Robertson of New York City, and was built in 1890-91 as a memorial to the city's Civil War dead, a meeting place for the Grand Army of the Republic, and to house the public library. It is the city's best example of the Richardsonian Romanesque style.

Palmer's first library was founded in 1815 as a private subscription library, but it, along with subsequent attempts to maintain a library, failed until 1878. That year, the Young Men's Library Association purchased the collection of a recently failed association and opened a public reading room in a commercial storefront on Central Street. Calls for a permanent collection and building began in the 1880s, along with calls for a war memorial. In 1890, Dr. W.H. Stowe donated land for the building, which was formally dedicated in April 1891.

The library association relinquished control of the library to the city in 1963, and it moved into new premises in 1977. The library space now serves as a senior center, and the GAR hall serves as meeting space for the community.

== See also ==
- National Register of Historic Places listings in Hampden County, Massachusetts
