= Thomas and Esther Smith House =

Historic house in Massachusetts, United States

- U.S. National Register of Historic Places
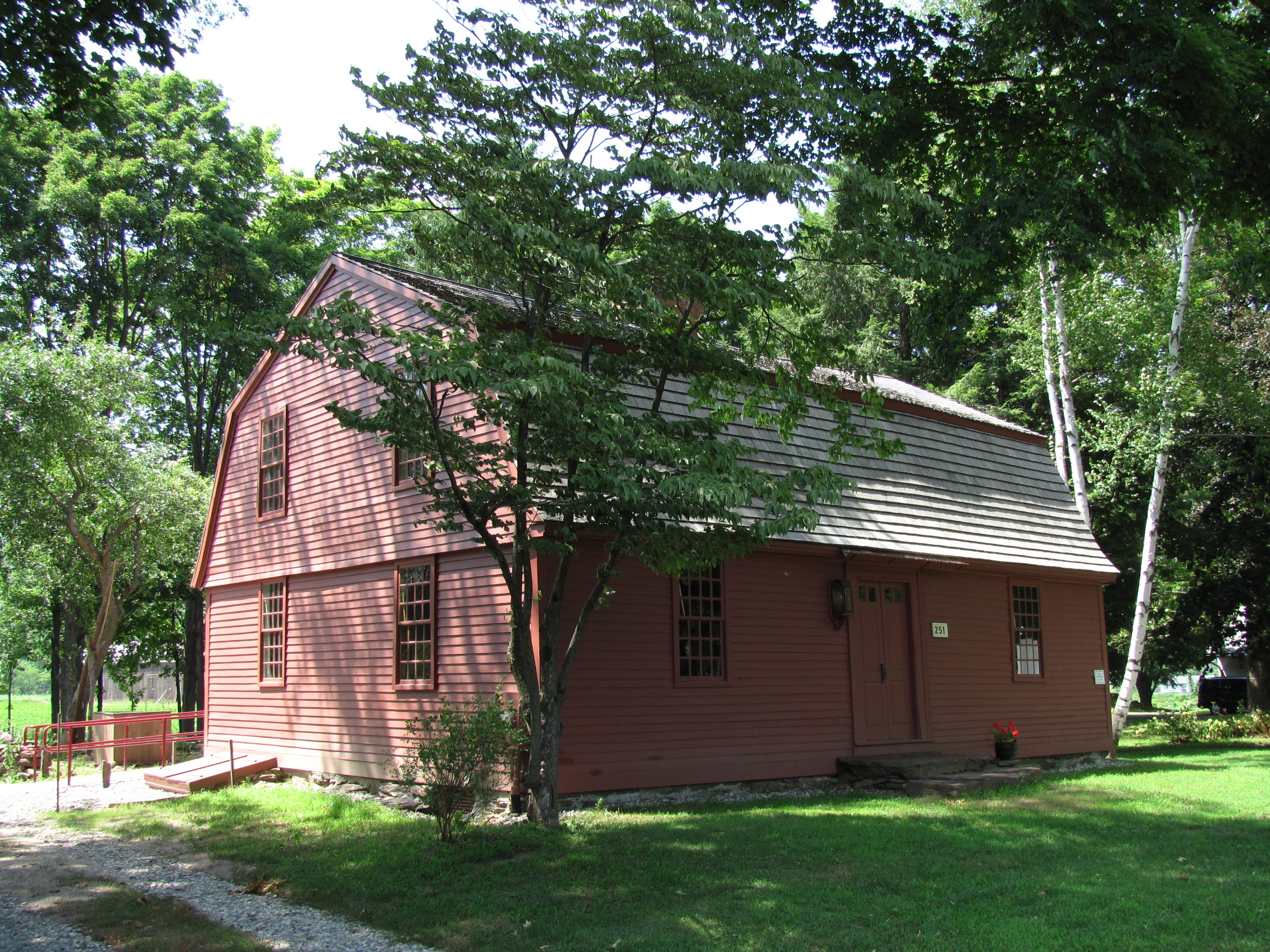

- Location within Massachusetts Location within the United States
- Location: Agawam, Massachusetts
- Coordinates: 42°4′31″N 72°41′44″W
- Architectural style: Georgian
- NRHP reference No.: 05000217
- Added to NRHP: June 2, 2005

Thomas and Esther Smith House is a historic house at 251 North West Street in Agawam, Massachusetts. It is one of the oldest houses in Agawam. The house is situated on 1 acre (0.40 ha) of land about 5 miles (8.0 km) west of the Connecticut River, at the foot of Provin Mountain. It is a vernacular 1 1/2-story house with plain Georgian styling. The main block of the house is three bays wide, with a gambrel roof and a central chimney. A 1 1/2-story addition on the western side of the house as a gabled roof. The main block's foundation is fieldstone, while that of the addition is brick and concrete block.

Inside the house, the main block follows a fairly standard Georgian four-room plan. A vestibule with a dogleg stair separates a hall and a parlor in the front, and the rear is divided asymmetrically into a large kitchen space and a small bedroom. Fireplaces open from the central chimney onto the hall, parlor and kitchen. The kitchen fireplace is particularly deep, and includes a bake oven (now coated with a layer of concrete) at its rear, rather than a more typical placement on the side. The upstairs of the main block is divided into four bedrooms, all with very basic finishing work. The exterior walls and ceilings are plastered, while the interior walls which separate them are either plastered or of simple wood construction.

The addition, built c. 1930s, is accessed from the small bedroom space, and includes a kitchen space that dates roughly to the period of its construction. The kitchen is at the level of the main part of the house, but a doorway leads to stairs going up and down to rooms in the rest of the addition, which were laid out to provide a separate living space.

The construction date of the house is uncertain, and is believed to have been sometime before 1758, when a deed mentions the home of one George Mixer on this parcel of land. The purchaser of the land, Thomas Smith, was a carpenter and housewright, and may have been this house's builder. Tree ring dating places some of the house's structural elements somewhat later, circa 1790. The house was built using a plank framing method that is distinctive to the Connecticut River valley.

The property remained in the Smith family until 1843. It was owned by the Park family until 1910, and then went through a succession of owners before its acquisition by the Agawam Historical Society in 2002. The house remained without modern amenities until the 1950s. It is now operated by the historical society as a house museum. It was listed on the National Register of Historic Places in 2005.

== See also ==
- National Register of Historic Places listings in Hampden County, Massachusetts
