= John and Ruth Rose House =

Historic house in Massachusetts, United States

- John and Ruth House
- U.S. National Register of Historic Places
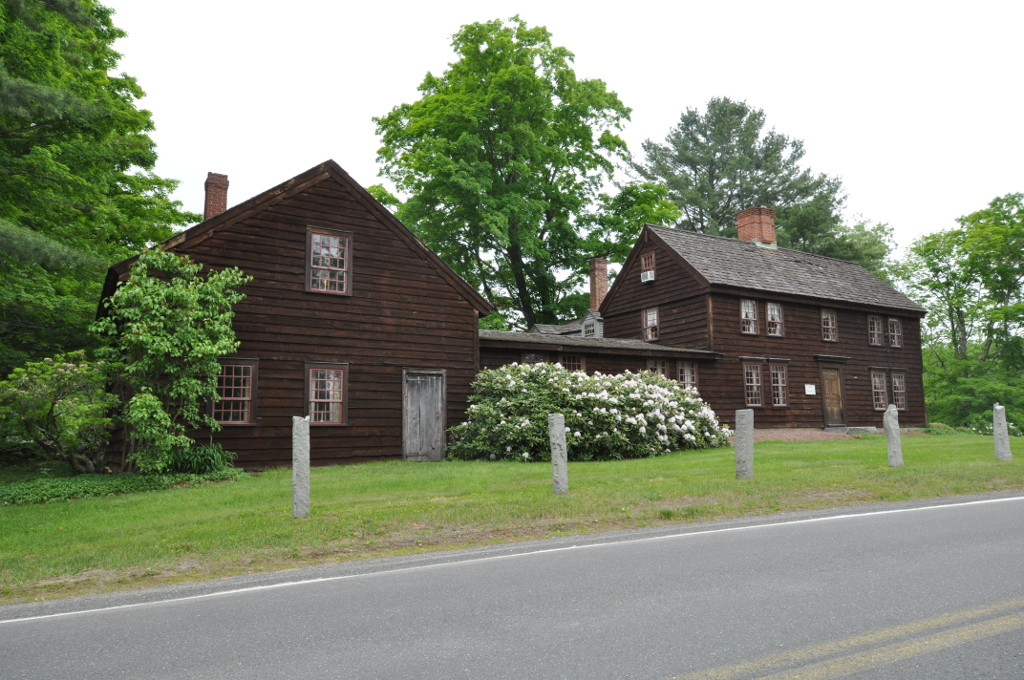

- Location within Massachusetts Location within the United States
- Location: 944 Main Rd., Granville, Massachusetts
- Coordinates: 42°4′22″N 72°54′3″W
- Area: 3.35 acres (1.36 ha)
- Built: c. 1742
- Built by: Rose, John
- Architectural style: Colonial, Georgian
- NRHP reference No.: 100002772
- Added to NRHP: August 10, 2018

The John and Ruth Rose House is a historic house at 944 Main Road in Granville, Massachusetts. It was built about 1742 by John Rose, one of the first colonial settlers of the area, and is a good example of rural Georgian architecture. The house was listed on the National Register of Historic Places in 2018.

== Description and history ==
The John and Ruth Rose House stands in a rural setting west of the village of Granville Center, on the north side of Main Road (Massachusetts Route 57) west of Barnard Road. It is a 2 1/2-story wood-frame structure, with a gabled roof, central chimney, and clapboarded exterior. A gambrel-roofed ell extends to the rear of the main block, and a single-story connector extends westward, joining it to another two-story structure. The main block has a five-bay facade, with sash windows symmetrically arranged around the main entrance. The entrance is framed by pilasters and topped by a corniced entablature. The interior of the house follows a central chimney plan, as finished with a combination of finishes original to the house, reconstructions, and materials salvaged from other period buildings.

John Rose is believed to have built this house about 1742 on land he acquired from the town's first colonial proprietors. It is possible that the rear ell was built even earlier, in 1738. Rose was active in local civic affairs, serving as a town selectman. His house was later owned by Ebenezer Smith, a local tavern operator who also served in the American Revolutionary War.

== See also ==
- National Register of Historic Places listings in Hampden County, Massachusetts
