= School Street Barn =

- U.S. National Register of Historic Places
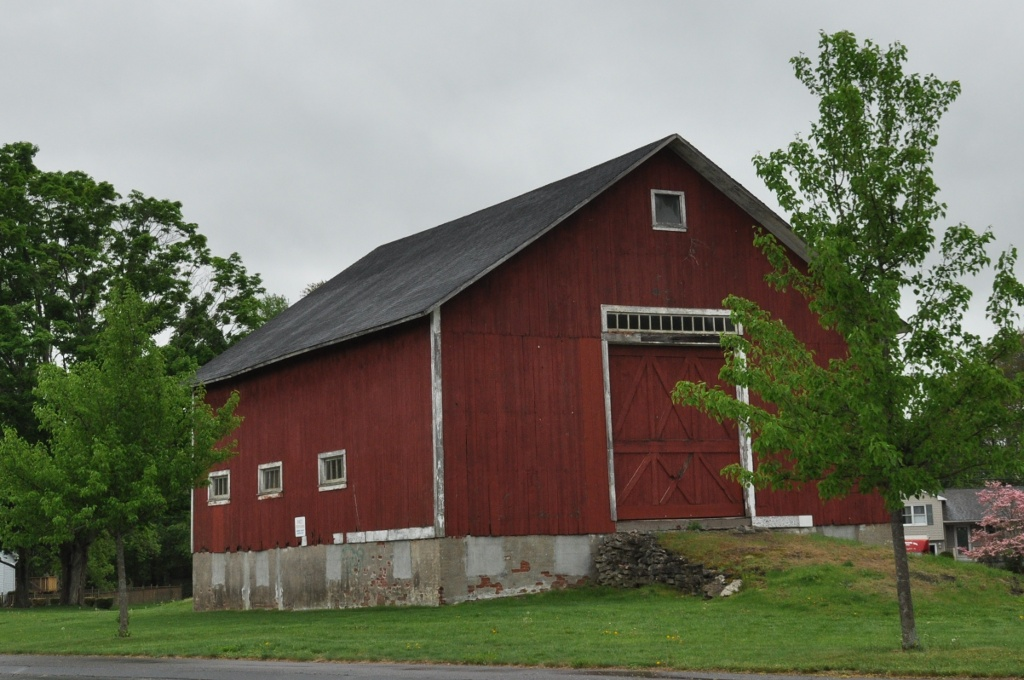

- Location within Massachusetts Location within the United States
- Location: School Street Park, Agawam, Massachusetts
- Coordinates: 42°4′27″N 72°35′34″W
- Area: 2 acres (0.81 ha)
- Built: 1880
- NRHP reference No.: 12000782
- Added to NRHP: September 10, 2012

The School Street Barn is the last remaining 19th century barn in Agawam, Massachusetts. Built in 1880, it is located in the town's School Street Park, and is one of the few surviving elements of the Springfield City Jail Farm, which was located here in the mid-20th century. The barn was listed on the National Register of Historic Places in 2012.

== Description and history ==
The School Street Barn is located in eastern Agawam, on the north side of School Street a short way west of its junction with River Road. The barn is located in School Street Park, between Main Street and the parking area within the park boundaries. It is about 51 feet (16 m) long and 41 feet (12 m) wide, with a gable height of about 30 feet (9.1 m). It stands on a brick and stone foundation, and has concrete ramps to the large barn doors centered on the gable ends. It is sided with vertically mounted tongue-and-groove wooden boards. The interior of the barn is a typical three story New England post-and-beam construction.

The area where the barn stands was agricultural land from relatively early in the colonial period, serving as a food source for Springfield, located just across the Connecticut River to the east. Originally part of larger parcels, the property had a farmhouse built on it about 1840. By 1880 the property was owned by absentee owners, whose renters probably built the barn around 1880. The barn's double-ramp form is extremely unusual in the Connecticut River valley, where bank barns and single-ramp barns were more common; it is the only known example of the form in Agawam. Private farming of the property ended with flooding on the river in 1938, and the property was acquired by the county. From 1938 until the late 1980s the area was part of Hampden County's jail farm, which provided food for the prison population in the Springfield York Street jail, some of whose inmates served as farmhands. The property was turned over to the town, which converted it into the School Street Park.

== See also ==
- National Register of Historic Places listings in Hampden County, Massachusetts
