= Hadley Falls Company Housing District =

Historic district in Massachusetts, United States

- U.S. National Register of Historic Places
- U.S. Historic district
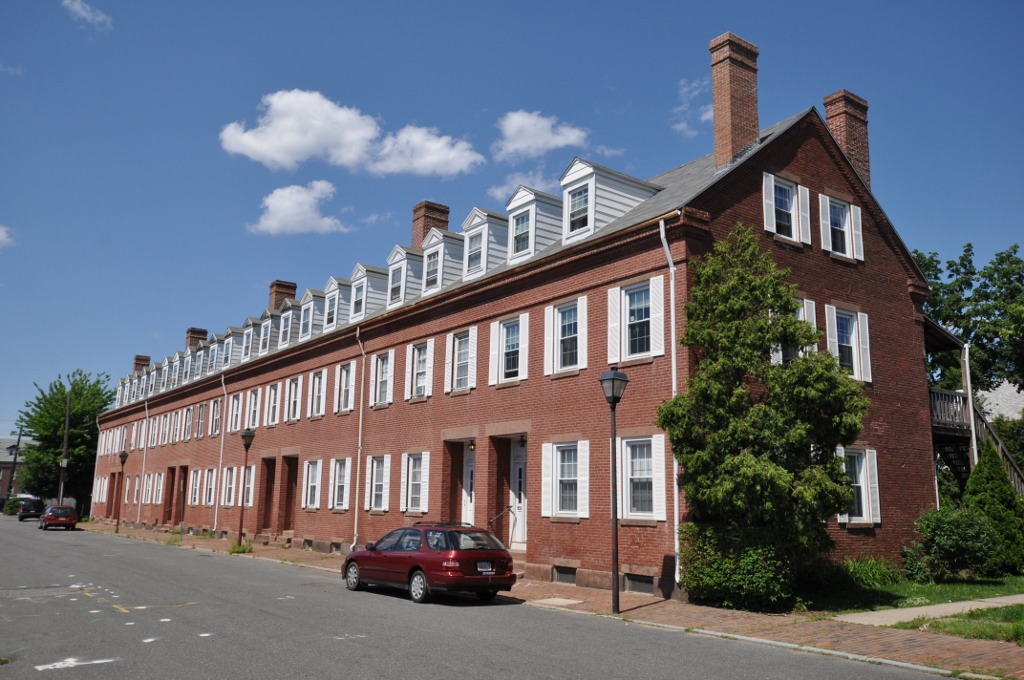

- Location within Holyoke Location within Massachusetts Location within the United States
- Location: Center, N. Canal, Grover, and Lyman Sts., Holyoke, Massachusetts
- Coordinates: 42°12′27″N 72°35′55″W
- Area: 2.1 acres (0.85 ha)
- Built: 1848
- Architect: Chase, John; McClallan, Charles
- NRHP reference No.: 72000133
- Added to NRHP: November 9, 1972

The Hadley Falls Company Housing District is a residential historic district encompassing a compact tract of factory worker housing in Holyoke, Massachusetts. Built in 1847-48, it is one of the earliest and largest surviving examples of company-built worker housing in the state. It includes five rowhouses facing Center, Lyman, Grover, and Canal Streets. The district was listed on the National Register of Historic Places in 1972.

== Description and history ==
The Hadley Falls Company Housing District is located on the north side of Holyoke's former industrial core. It consists of five brick rowhouses, two of which face each other on Center Street between Canal and Lyman Streets. The other three are adjacent to those two, and face Canal Street, Lyman Street and Grove Street. Each rowhouse has between eight and ten units, and is 2-1/2 stories in height, with a gabled roof. Four of the five buildings have a series of pedimented gable dormers in the roof. Chimneys are set at the ends and at every other party wall, and the unit entrances are grouped in pairs at the other party walls.

The rowhouses were built by the Hadley Falls Mill Company, which was established in 1847 in a bid to recreate the success at Holyoke of the industrialization effort at Lowell, Massachusetts. They were built by engineer John Chase and contractor Charles McClallan. The exteriors were rehabilitated in 1974-75. The buildings were at the time one of the largest concentrations of company-built worker housing anywhere in the state, and were of a notably higher quality than other such housing built in the 1840s and 1850s.

== See also ==
- National Register of Historic Places listings in Hampden County, Massachusetts
