= Academy Historic District =

Historic district in Massachusetts, United States

- U.S. National Register of Historic Places
- U.S. Historic district
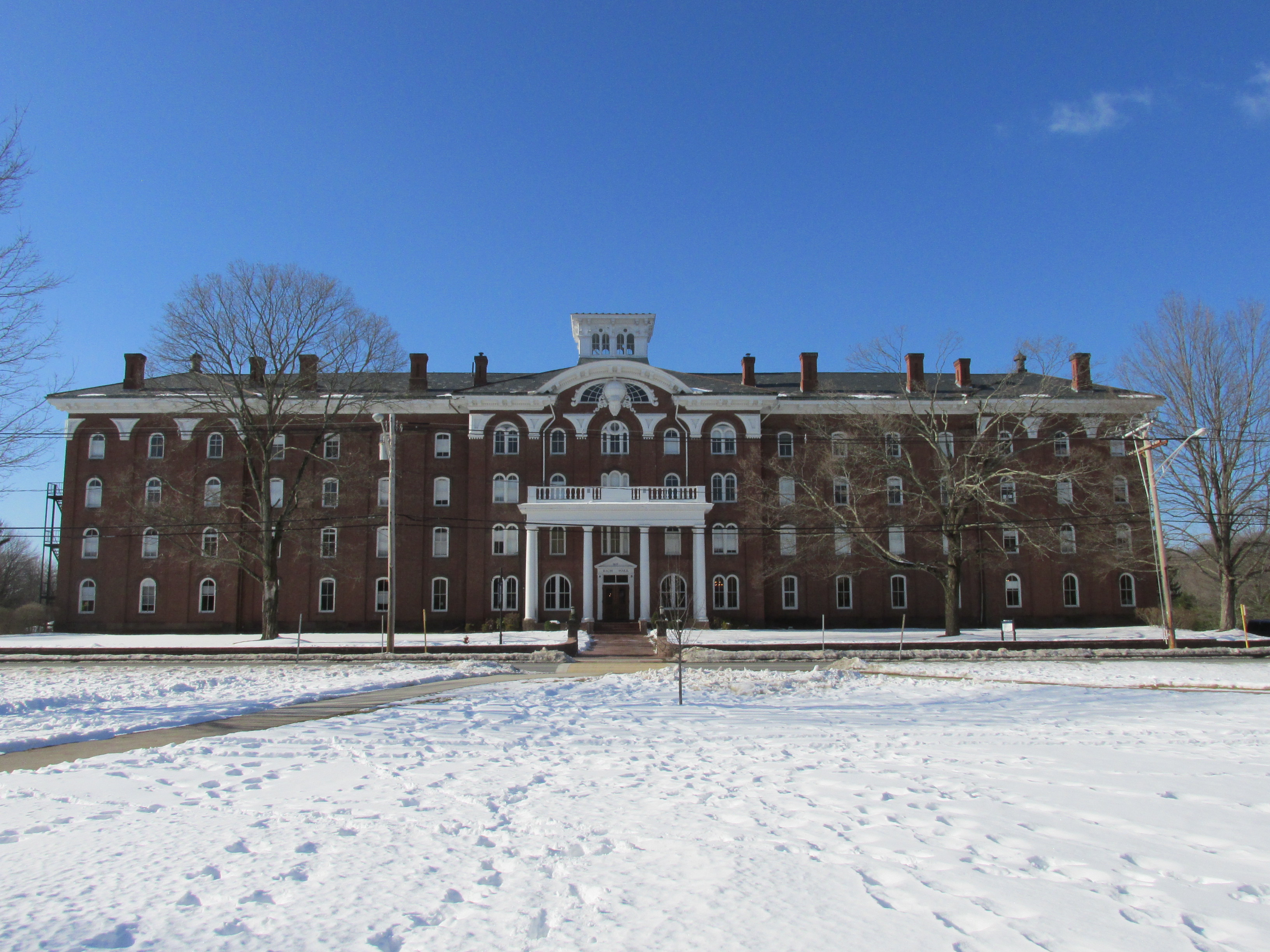
- Rich Hall; Wilbraham and Monson Academy

- Location within Massachusetts Location within the United States
- Location: Wilbraham, Massachusetts
- Coordinates: 42°7′29″N 72°25′56″W
- Architect: Multiple
- Architectural style: Mid 19th Century Revival, Late Victorian
- NRHP reference No.: 79000351
- Added to NRHP: April 20, 1979

The Academy Historic District is a historic district in the center of Wilbraham, Massachusetts. Its 65 acres (26 ha) encompass the historic center of Wilbraham, as well as the historic central portion of the campus of the Wilbraham & Monson Academy. It includes properties on Mountain Road (roughly the southern boundary of the district), Main Street, and Faculty Street. Wesleyan Academy was founded in 1817 and moved to Wilbraham in 1824; its oldest buildings date to 1825. It merged with Monson Academy in the 20th century to form the present school that occupies the academic premises. The academy was a major center of Methodist teaching in New England and was a prominent factor in the town's growth.

The ma It is a two-story building with a slate roof and a white clapboard belltower. Next to it is Fisk Hall, an 1851 two-story building made of brick with sandstone trim; it is topped by a cupola. Binney Hall, built in 1854, is similarly a two-story brick building. The Smith Hall Gymnasium was built in 1896 and has Richardsonian Romanesque details and a hipped slate roof. The Alumni Memorial Chapel stands next to the Gymnasium; it was built in 1867 of red sandstone.

In addition to the academy buildings, the district includes a number of civic and residential buildings, including the Old Meetinghouse (built 1793), which was originally designed as a meeting hall, but was converted in 1835 into a residential duplex. Adjacent to the Old Meetinghouse, is the Hearse House, an outbuilding that housed the town's hearses from 1890 to 1920. The district also includes a number of residences built mostly in the middle of the 19th century. The district was listed on the National Register of Historic Places in 1979.

== See also ==
- National Register of Historic Places listings in Hampden County, Massachusetts
