= Carreau Block =

- U.S. National Register of Historic Places
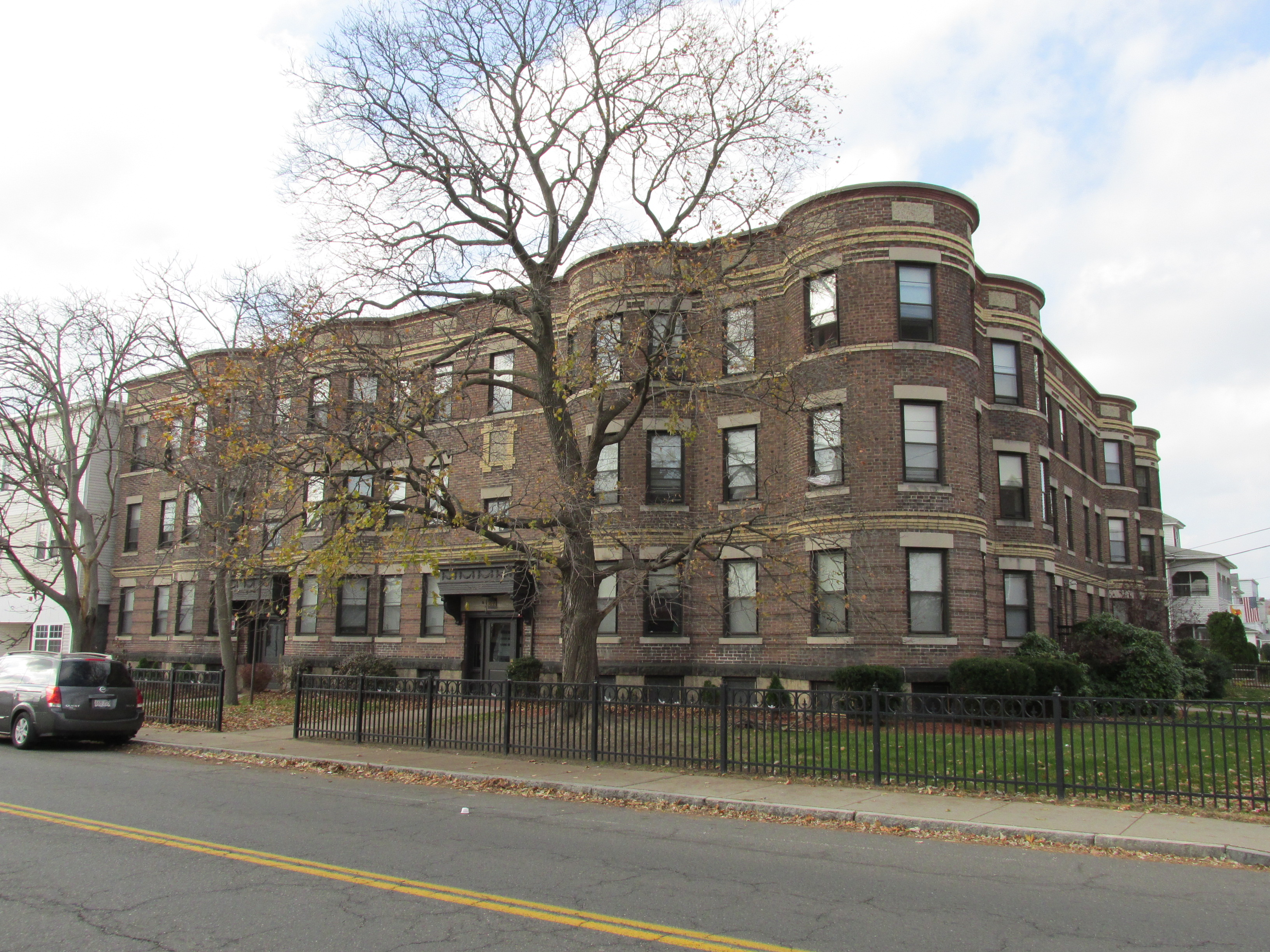
- Carreau Block

- Location within Massachusetts Location within the United States
- Location: 640-642 Chicopee St., Chicopee, Massachusetts
- Coordinates: 42°11′5″N 72°36′41″W
- Area: less than one acre
- Built: 1912
- Architect: Carreau, Louis & Son
- Architectural style: Classical Revival
- NRHP reference No.: 98000993
- Added to NRHP: August 6, 1998

The Carreau Block is a historic Classical Revival apartment block at 640-642 Chicopee Street in Chicopee, Massachusetts. It was built in 1912 by Louis Carreau, a locally notable builder of French Canadian extraction, and is his only known surviving building of this type. It was listed on the National Register of Historic Places in 1998.

== Description and history ==
The Carreau Block is located in Chicopee's Willimansett neighborhood, at the southwestern corner of Chicopee and Walter Streets. It is a roughly L-shaped brick building, three stories in height, presenting finished facades to both streets. It is built out of red-brown brick with trim that is either yellow brick or sandstone. Undulating rounded window bays mark the main building corner and flank the two entrances facing Chicopee Street, and also on that facing Walter Street. Bands of yellow brick separate the first and second floor, and also the third floor from the cornice, which is a slight concrete projection. The building houses fifteen residential units.

The block was built in 1912, a period in which Willimansett was growing rapidly as a housing area serving the industries of adjacent Holyoke. The area had benefited from the construction of a bridge across the Connecticut River in 1893, followed by the introduction of streetcar service two years later. Most of the early residents of this block shared the ethnic affiliation of its builder, the French Canadian Louis Carreau. Carreau was a prominent builder in Chicopee and Holyoke, but most of his residential buildings were wood-frame single or multiunit buildings. It is the only building attributable to Carreau still standing in the city.

== See also ==
- National Register of Historic Places listings in Hampden County, Massachusetts
