= Maplewood Hotel =

- U.S. National Register of Historic Places
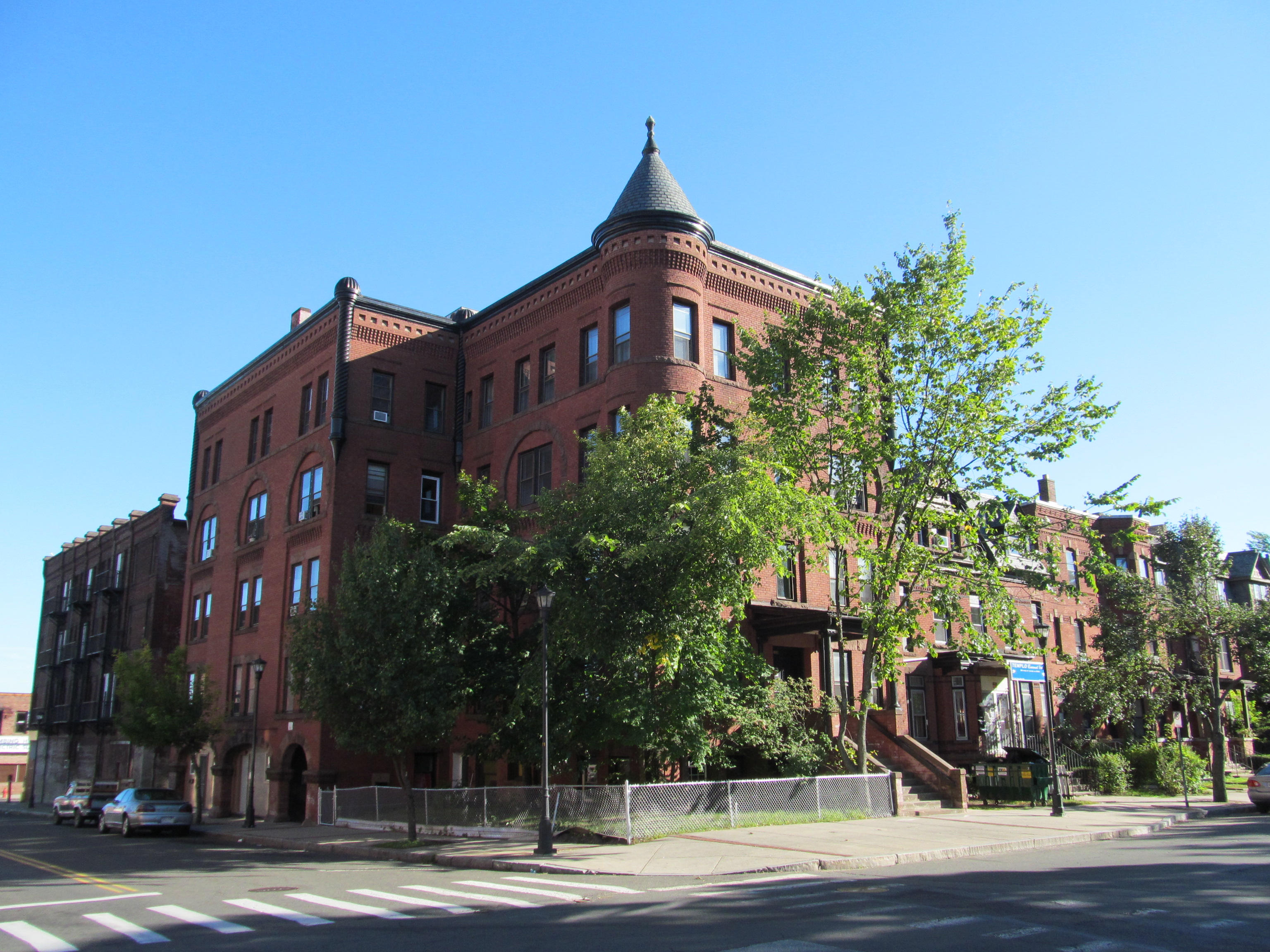
- Maplewood Hotel

- Location within Massachusetts Location within the United States
- Location: Holyoke, Massachusetts
- Coordinates: 42°12′13″N 72°36′44″W
- Built: 1889
- Architect: Beebe, Frank
- Architectural style: Tudor Revival, Romanesque
- NRHP reference No.: 83003980
- Added to NRHP: November 10, 1983

The Maplewood Hotel is a historic residential hotel at 328-330 Maple Street in Holyoke, Massachusetts. Consisting of two buildings dating to the late 19th century, it was the first residential building of its type in the city, built by local industrialist Frank Beebe, who occupied one of its units. When opened, it offered high quality furnished and unfurnished residences in a full-service environment. The hotel was listed on the National Register of Historic Places in 1983. It continues to be used for residences.

== Description and history ==
The Maplewood Hotel is located on Maple Street in downtown Holyoke, at the corner of Essex Street and overlooking Library Park. It consists of two buildings that have become conjoined by internal connections. The 2 1/2-story brick block at 330 Maple Street was built first, between 1884 and 1889, while the four-story building at 328 Maple Street was built c. 1890. The latter was opened as the Maplewood Hotel, providing furnished and unfurnished residences to middle and upper class residents of the city. In 1924 the two buildings were joined by connections through their adjacent walls.

The hotel was the brainchild of industrialist Frank Beebe, whose father had started Holyoke's Beebe and Webber textile mills. Beebe took over his father's businesses, and expanded them, increasing the family fortune. He retired from that business in 1901, devoting himself to philanthropic endeavours. He gave the Maplewood to a social services organization in 1921, which effected the combination of the two buildings, and promoted Beebe's philosophies of better living and self-help to its tenants and the community.

== See also ==
- National Register of Historic Places listings in Hampden County, Massachusetts
