= Purchase-Ferre House =

Historic house in Massachusetts, United States

- U.S. National Register of Historic Places
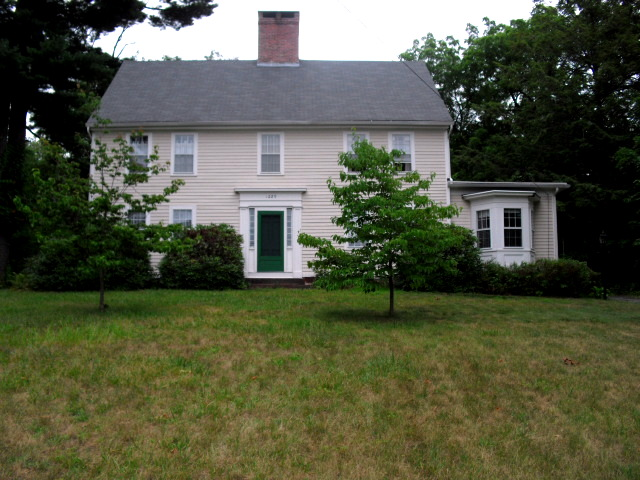

- Location within Massachusetts Location within the United States
- Location: Agawam, Massachusetts
- Coordinates: 42°2′58″N 72°36′58″W
- Area: 3.35 acres (1.36 ha)
- Built: 1764
- Architect: Purchase, Jonathan
- Architectural style: Colonial, Georgian
- NRHP reference No.: 90001805
- Added to NRHP: November 29, 1990

The Purchase-Ferre House is a historic house at 1289 Main Street in Agawam, Massachusetts. Built in 1764, it is one of a small number of surviving 18th-century houses in the town. It has been in the hands of the Ferre family since 1799, and is little-altered since then. The house was listed on the National Register of Historic Places in 1990.

== Description and history ==
The Purchase-Ferre House is set on the east side of Main Street (Massachusetts Route 159), south of Agawam's town center. It is a 2 1/2-story wood-frame structure, five bays wide, with a side-gable roof, clapboard siding, a large central chimney, and a sandstone block foundation. The main facade, facing west, is symmetrically arranged, with the entrance in the central bay, flanked by sidelight windows and pilasters, and topped by a dentillated entablature. The present door is a replacement, but the original house door survives. The interior of the house includes the remnants of a basement apartment (apparently only used in the 18th century), and has a typical Georgian plan on its main floors, with a narrow entry vestibule with winding staircase, parlors to either side of the chimney, and the original kitchen space behind the chimney. A c. 1970 addition to the rear houses a modern kitchen.

The Georgian style house was built in 1764 by Jonathan Purchase, and was acquired by Moses Ferre in 1799 after a series of intermediate owners. It has since remained in the hands of Ferre's descendants. It underwent relatively little alteration during that period, and is one of Agawam's oldest houses. It was reportedly used at one time to manufacture boxes for the Springfield Armory.

== See also ==
- National Register of Historic Places listings in Hampden County, Massachusetts
