= Veterans Park (Holyoke, Massachusetts) =

- Hampden Park Historic District
- U.S. National Register of Historic Places
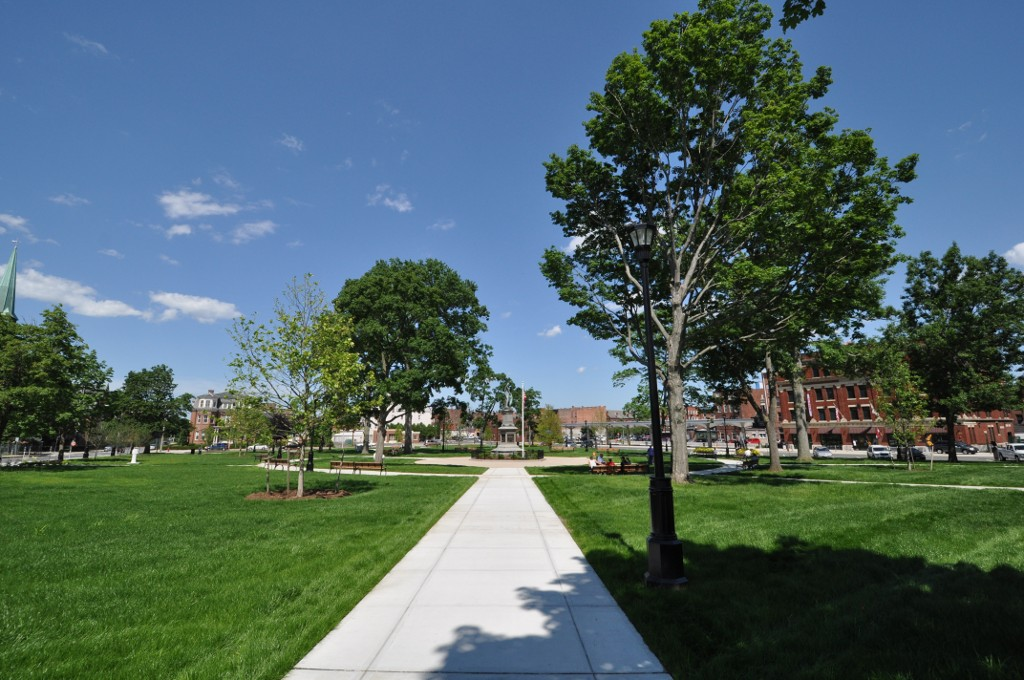
- Veterans Park (formerly Hampden Park)

- Location within Massachusetts Location within the United States
- Location: Holyoke, Massachusetts
- Coordinates: 42°12′30″N 72°36′30″W
- Area: 5 acres (2.0 ha)
- NRHP reference No.: 12000781
- Added to NRHP: September 10, 2012

Veterans Park is a city park in the downtown area of Holyoke, Massachusetts. Originally called Hampden Park when it was given to the city by the Holyoke Water Power Company in 1861, it was rededicated in 1962 to honor the city's military veterans. The park and a few surrounding buildings were listed on the National Register of Historic Places in 2012 as the Hampden Park Historic District. Included in this designation are St. Jerome's Church (built during the late 1850s), the Convent of the Sisters of Notre Dame de Lourdes (1869), and the former Central Fire Station (1914), and other buildings.

== Description and history ==
Veterans Park is located in downtown Holyoke, occupying an entire city block bounded by Chestnut, Hampden, Maple, and Dwight Streets. It is basically flat, with a central circular plot, from which eight straight walkways radiate to the corners and sides. Surrounded by granite curbing and wrought iron fencing at the center is the city's monument to its Civil War dead, designed by Henry Jackson Ellicott and erected in 1876. Monuments elsewhere in the park are dedicated to the city's soldiers who fought in World War II, the Korean War, and the Vietnam War.

When Holyoke's grid of streets was laid out in 1848, this particular parcel was set aside as one of three public parks, of which it is the only one to survive. St. Jerome's Church was built in the 1850s to cater to the many Irish Catholic immigrants who settled in Holyoke and worked in its industries. The park was originally owned by the Holyoke Water Power Company, and was given to the city in 1861. This led to a more formal design for the space, which has remained largely unchanged since. After Holyoke City Hall was built a block away, the park became a central open space for civic and social gatherings, in particular its Memorial Day commemorations.

== See also ==
- National Register of Historic Places listings in Hampden County, Massachusetts
- Pulaski Park (Holyoke, Massachusetts), listed park with Olmsted design
