= First Congregational Church of East Longmeadow =

Historic church in Massachusetts, United States

- U.S. National Register of Historic Places
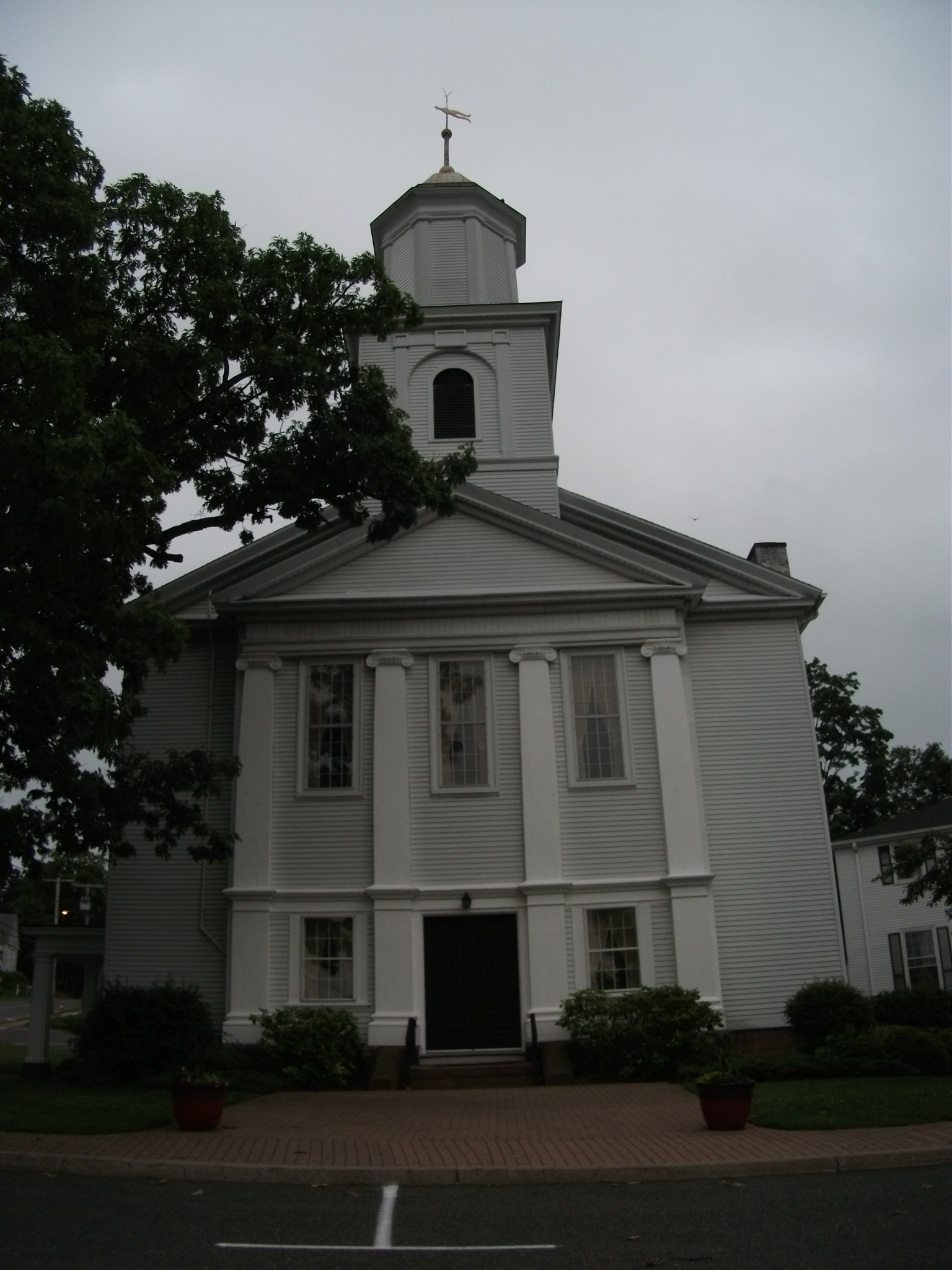

- Location within Massachusetts Location within the United States
- Location: 7 Somers Road, East Longmeadow, Massachusetts
- Coordinates: 42°3′51″N 72°30′46″W
- Area: 1.667 acres (0.675 ha)
- Built: 1828
- Architectural style: Early Republic
- NRHP reference No.: 78000444
- Added to NRHP: January 3, 1978

First Congregational Church of East Longmeadow is a historic church in East Longmeadow, Massachusetts. Built in 1828, it is the oldest church building in East Longmeadow, and houses its oldest congregation. The church was listed on the National Register of Historic Places in 1978. The congregation is affiliated with the United Church of Christ.

== Architecture and history ==
The First Congregational Church is located in East Longmeadow's city center, on the south side of its central rotary on a triangular parcel bounded by Somers Road and Prospect Street. It is a single-story wood frame structure, with a gabled roof and clapboarded exterior. Its main facade has a central projecting entry, its three bays articulated by pilasters and topped by a fully pedimented gable. The three bays originally had entrances in each bay, but the outer two have been replaced by windows. The church tower has a square first stage, and octagonal belfry stage, and a cupola at the top.

The congregation was established in 1827, and the church was built the following year. It was originally located further up Somers Road, and was moved to its present location in 1859. At that time it also underwent some remodeling, adding stylistic details typical of the work of Charles Bulfinch. In addition to serving the congregation, the building was also used for town meetings until the construction of the town hall in 1882. The church interior was again remodeled in 1948, and in 1953 its basement was finished and the attached Fellowship Hall was built.

== See also ==
- National Register of Historic Places listings in Hampden County, Massachusetts
