= United States Post Office–Palmer Main =

- US Post Office–Palmer Main
- U.S. National Register of Historic Places
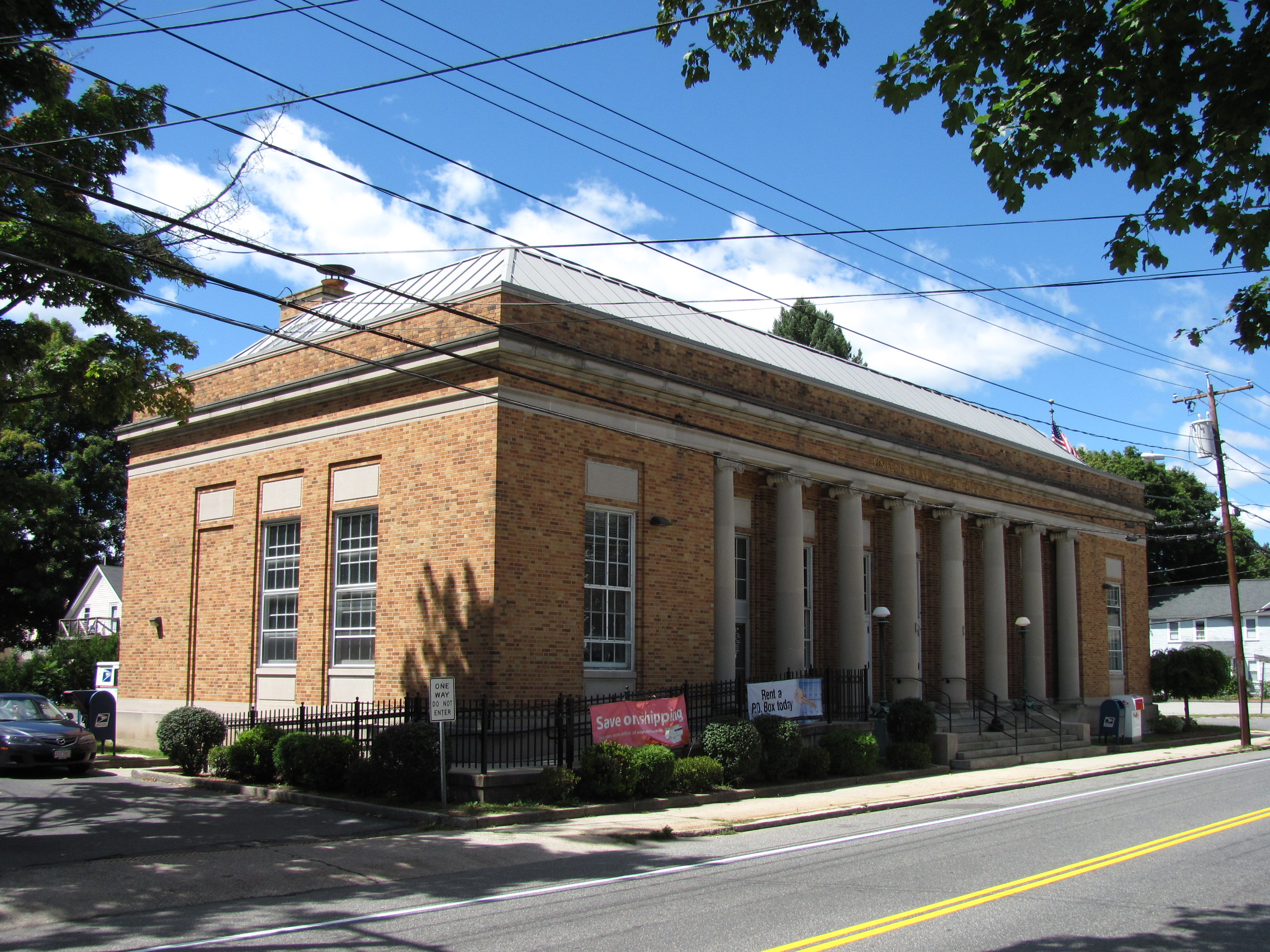
- Palmer Main Post Office

- Location within Massachusetts Location within the United States
- Interactive map showing the location of the U.S. Post Office-Palmer Main
- Location: 1057 Park St., Palmer, Massachusetts
- Coordinates: 42°9′28″N 72°19′39″W
- Area: less than one acre
- Built: 1931
- Architect: Simon, Louis A.; Et al.
- Architectural style: Classical Revival
- NRHP reference No.: 85003336
- Added to NRHP: December 12, 1985

The US Post Office—Palmer Main is a historic post office building at 1057 Park Street in Palmer, Massachusetts. Built in 1931, it is a good local example of Classical Revival architecture. It was listed on the National Register of Historic Places in 1985.

== Description and history ==
Palmer's main post office is located on the eastern outskirts of its downtown area, at the southeast corner of Park and Central Streets. It is a roughly rectangular single-story structure, with a steel frame and an exterior finished in brick and limestone. Its main entrance is centered on the long, street-facing side of the building, which is lined with large Ionic columns set in antis in a broad recess. The columns support a brick and limestone frieze, cornice, and low balustrade that encircles the truncated hip roof. The steps leading to the entrance are flanked by original Art Deco lampposts. The interior lobby area has terrazzo marble flooring and marble wainscoting, as well as original woodwork.

The post office was built in 1931, to a design by the Office of the Supervising Architect for the U.S. Treasury, then under the direction of Louis A. Simon. The building cost more than $75,000 to build, a high price for the period, and apparently bankrupted the first contractor to work on it, since it was completed by another. The building's relative grandeur is somewhat offset by its odd location in what is a mostly residential area on the fringe of the city's downtown.

== See also ==
- National Register of Historic Places listings in Hampden County, Massachusetts
- List of United States post offices
