= Al's Diner =

- U.S. National Register of Historic Places
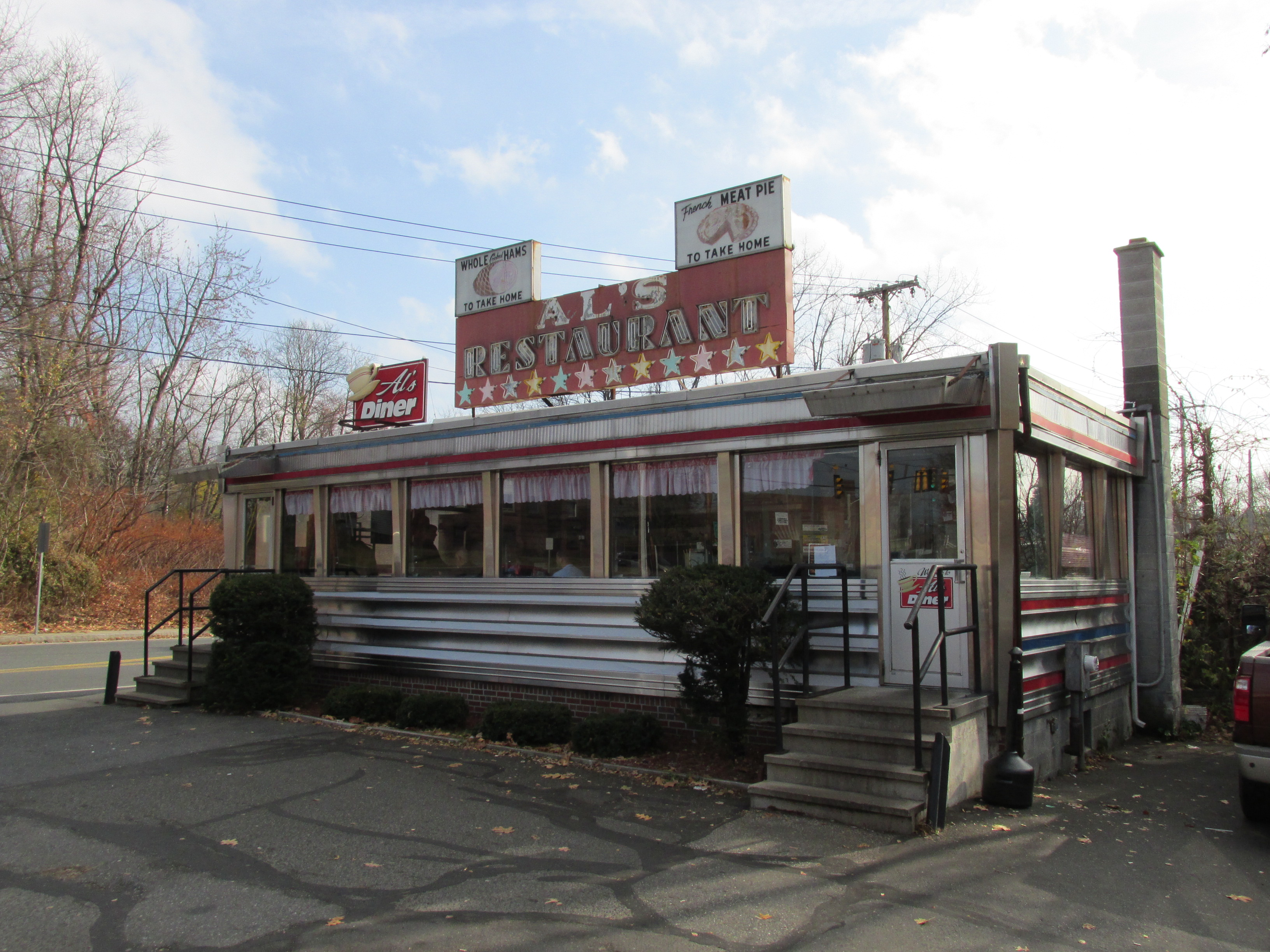
- Al's Diner

- Location within Massachusetts Location within the United States
- Location: Chicopee, Massachusetts
- Coordinates: 42°11′30″N 72°35′58″W
- Architect: Master Diner
- MPS: Diners of Massachusetts MPS
- NRHP reference No.: 00001482
- Added to NRHP: December 14, 2000

Al's Diner is a historic diner at 14 Yelle Street in Chicopee, Massachusetts. It was, at the time of its listing on the National Register of Historic Places in 2000, one of only of two diners in Massachusetts built by Master Diner of Pequannock, New Jersey, which operated from 1940 to the 1970s. The diner was brought to Chicopee in 1958, and has been known variously as Al's Diner, Al's Restaurant, and The White Diner. Until 1983 Al's Diner was a 24-hour operation; the diner presently serves breakfast and lunch, with limited dinner hours on Thursdays and Fridays.

== Description and history ==
Al's Diner stands on the west side of Yelle Street in the Willimansett area of northern Chicopee, just south of its junction with Pleasant Street. It is set close to the road, with the parking area to its north and west. The manufactured portion of the diner is oriented perpendicular to the road on a brick-faced concrete foundation, with a concrete block kitchen addition to the south. The diner is three bays deep and eight wide, and is clad in steel with bands of blue and red enamel. Entrances are located at the first and eighth bays of the long side, sheltered by metal hoods with quilted undersides.

The interior of the diner houses six booths and fourteen counter stools, with a counter that extends the length of the structure. A staff access panel is located at the center of the counter. The original grill is still in place behind the counter, and the rear wall has steel panels with starburst motifs. The ceiling has a monitor section that includes traces of the interior's original color scheme.

The diner was manufactured by Master Diner of Pequannock, New Jersey, one of about sixty produced by the company. It was brought to Chicopee in 1958, and opened its doors the following year as The White Diner. It was purchased in 1962 by Al Rubin, who changed its name to Al's Restaurant. Operation of the diner has been concentrated for many years in members of the Mathews family, who purchased it in 1975.

== See also ==
- National Register of Historic Places listings in Hampden County, Massachusetts
