= Landlord Fowler Tavern =

- U.S. National Register of Historic Places
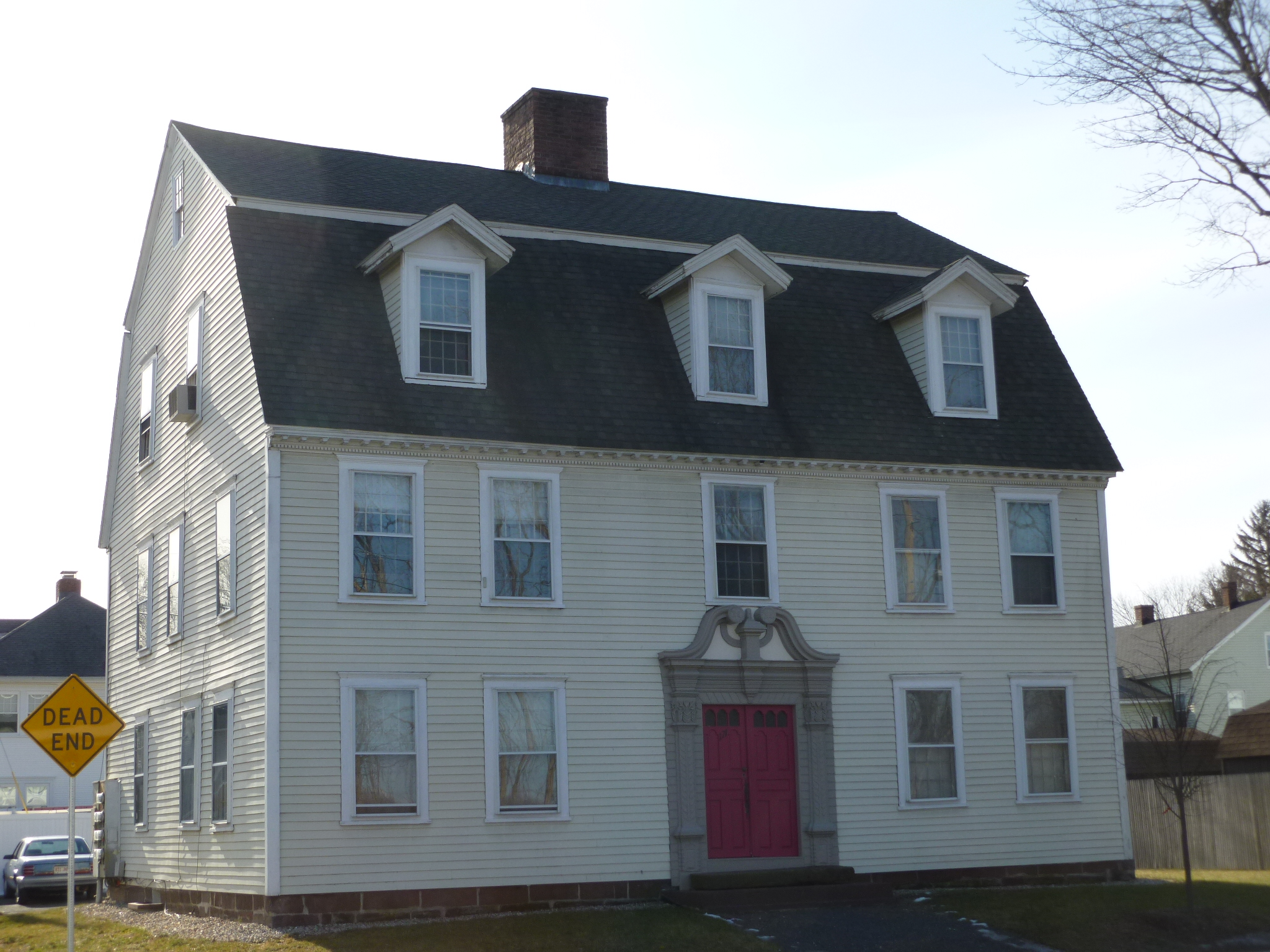

- Location within Massachusetts Location within the United States
- Location: 171 Main St., Westfield, Massachusetts
- Coordinates: 42°7′3″N 72°44′10″W
- Built: c. 1755
- Architectural style: Georgian
- NRHP reference No.: 82001914
- Added to NRHP: August 11, 1982

The Landlord Fowler Tavern is a historic tavern in Westfield, Massachusetts. Probably built in the 1750s, it is a good local example of Georgian architecture despite some unsympathetic modifications, and it was for about a century an important local social gathering point, and a major stop on the east-west stagecoach road. Now divided into apartments, it was listed on the National Register of Historic Places in 1982.

== Description and history ==
The former Landlord Fowler Tavern stands east of downtown Westfield, on the south side of Main Street (United States Route 20, a major route through the Berkshires to the west). It is set a short way west of the confluence of the Little River with the Westfield River, at the southwest corner of Main and Exchange Streets. It is a three-story wood frame structure, with two full stories topped by a broad gambrel roof. The steep portion of the roof is pierced by three gabled dormers, and a large brick chimney rises at its center. The front facade is five bays wide, with a center entrance. The entrance is a simplified modern version of its elaborate original, with pilasters rising to a scrolled pediment; the original is in the Metropolitan Museum of Art.

The building is estimated to have been built in the 1750s, or no later than 1761, the year in which Daniel Fowler was granted a license to operate a tavern in Westfield center. It was for many years a center of business and civic affairs in the town as well as a rest stop for travelers on the post road, on which it was located. During the American Revolutionary War, it served as a muster site for the local militia, and was where the local committee of safety met. Baron Friedrich Adolf Riedesel, a Hessian commander in the army of John Burgoyne, was quartered here after that army was captured at the end of the 1777 Saratoga campaign.

The 1830 construction of the Hampshire and Hampden Canal led to a decline in business on the post road, and Westfield's business district eventually developed further to the west. By the 1860s the building was in use as a residence. It was used briefly as a cigar factory between 1885 and 1916. Its original Georgian front door surround, a classic Connecticut River valley pediment, was removed from the building in the early 20th century. The building currently is divided into multiple dwelling units. Other modifications have been made in recent decades not in keeping with its historic integrity, including the removal of historic Georgian-style 12/12 wood window sash and replacement with non-historic 6/6 windows and the removal of likely original Georgian-style window hoods sometime after 2013.

== See also ==
- National Register of Historic Places listings in Hampden County, Massachusetts
