= Russell Center Historic District =

Historic district in Massachusetts, United States

- U.S. National Register of Historic Places
- U.S. Historic district
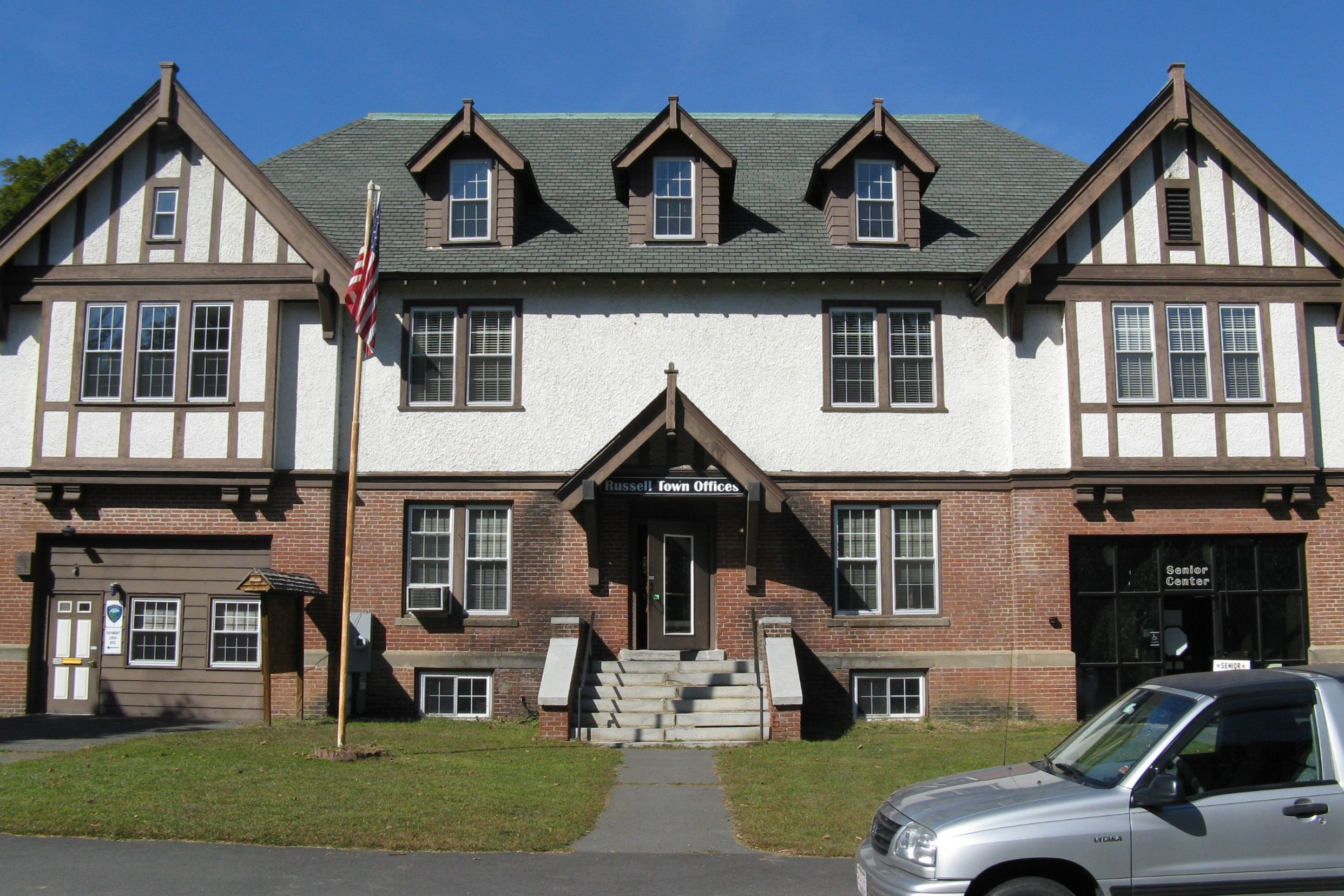
- Town Offices

- Location within Massachusetts Location within the United States
- Location: Junction of Main and Lincoln Ave., Russell, Massachusetts
- Coordinates: 42°11′22″N 72°51′24″W
- Area: 51 acres (21 ha)
- Architectural style: Greek Revival, Queen Anne, Colonial Revival
- NRHP reference No.: 96001524
- Added to NRHP: December 27, 1996

The Russell Center Historic District is a historic district encompassing the historic village center of Russell, Massachusetts. It is centered at the junction of Main Street and Lincoln Avenue, and is bordered by the Westfield River to the east, and the rising foothills of The Berkshires to the west. The village's 19th century development was spurred by the railroad and sustained by local papermaking businesses. It was listed on the National Register of Historic Places in 1996, and was named as one of the 1,000 places to visit in Massachusetts by the Great Places in Massachusetts Commission.

== Description and history ==
The town of Russell was settled in the late 18th century, with a modest town center near its geographic center in 1794. The present center's first major building was a Baptist church, built in 1792. The area gained in importance because of the presence of the main stage route (now United States Route 20), and then the arrival of the railroad (which was at first run on the south side of the Westfield River, but has since been rerouted to its north). It was aided economically by the development of papermaking as an enterprise, which continues to be an economic force (albeit at a reduced level) today.

The historic district consists of a stretch of Main Street, between US 20 and the river. Most of the buildings are residential, and are typified by common setbacks from the road and a similarity of scale. Most of the buildings were built between 1850 and 1895, and the oldest building, the Horace Parks House, dates to 1830. The district includes three prominent Tudor Revival buildings: the town hall (1916, pictured), elementary school (1926), and Catholic church (1927).

== See also ==
- National Register of Historic Places listings in Hampden County, Massachusetts
