= Moseley School (Westfield, Massachusetts) =

- U.S. National Register of Historic Places
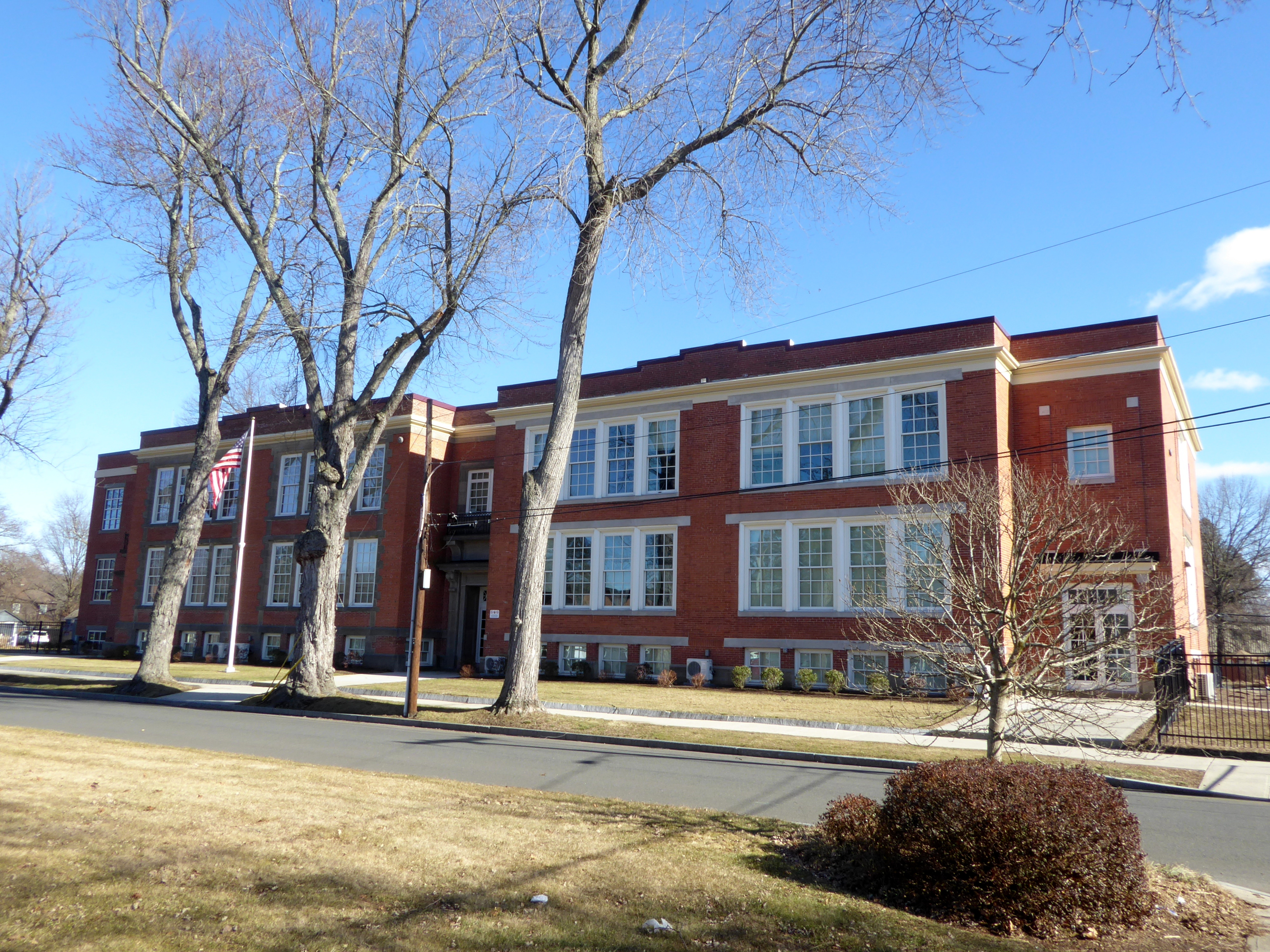

- Location within Massachusetts Location within the United States
- Location: 25 Dartmouth St., Westfield, Massachusetts
- Coordinates: 42°7′57″N 72°44′22″W
- Area: less than one acre
- Built: 1915
- Architect: George Haynes; Malcolm B. Harding
- Architectural style: Colonial Revival
- NRHP reference No.: 100005525
- Added to NRHP: September 4, 2020

The Moseley School is a historic school building at 25 Dartmouth Street in Westfield, Massachusetts. Built in 1924, it is a good local example of Colonial Revival architecture, and served the town as an elementary school for nearly a century. The building, vacant since 2009, was listed on the National Register of Historic Places in 2020.

== Description and history ==
The Moseley School is located north of downtown Westfield, in a small residential area east of North Elm Street (United States Route 202 and north of Union Street. It is set on just over one acre of land bounded on three sides by Dartmouth, Westminster, and Woodmont Streets. It is a two-story masonry structure built of brick, stone, and concrete, and set on a raised basement. Its main facade is 19 bays wide, representing two phases of construction. Windows are set group in fours in bays decorated with corner quoining. Entrances are set at a recess from the facade at the center and the outermost bays. The interior retains its original floor plan, and features are relatively little altered since its construction.

The oldest portion of the school, its northern half, was built in 1915 to meet burgeoning demand for educational services from the city's growing immigrant population. Growth continued, and the school's size was doubled in 1922. The original section was designed by George Haynes of Pittsfield, and the addition by Malcolm B. Harding. It served as an elementary school throughout, closing for two years in 1991 due to low enrollment, and permanently in 2009.

== See also ==
- National Register of Historic Places listings in Hampden County, Massachusetts
