= War Memorial Building (Holyoke, Massachusetts) =

- U.S. National Register of Historic Places
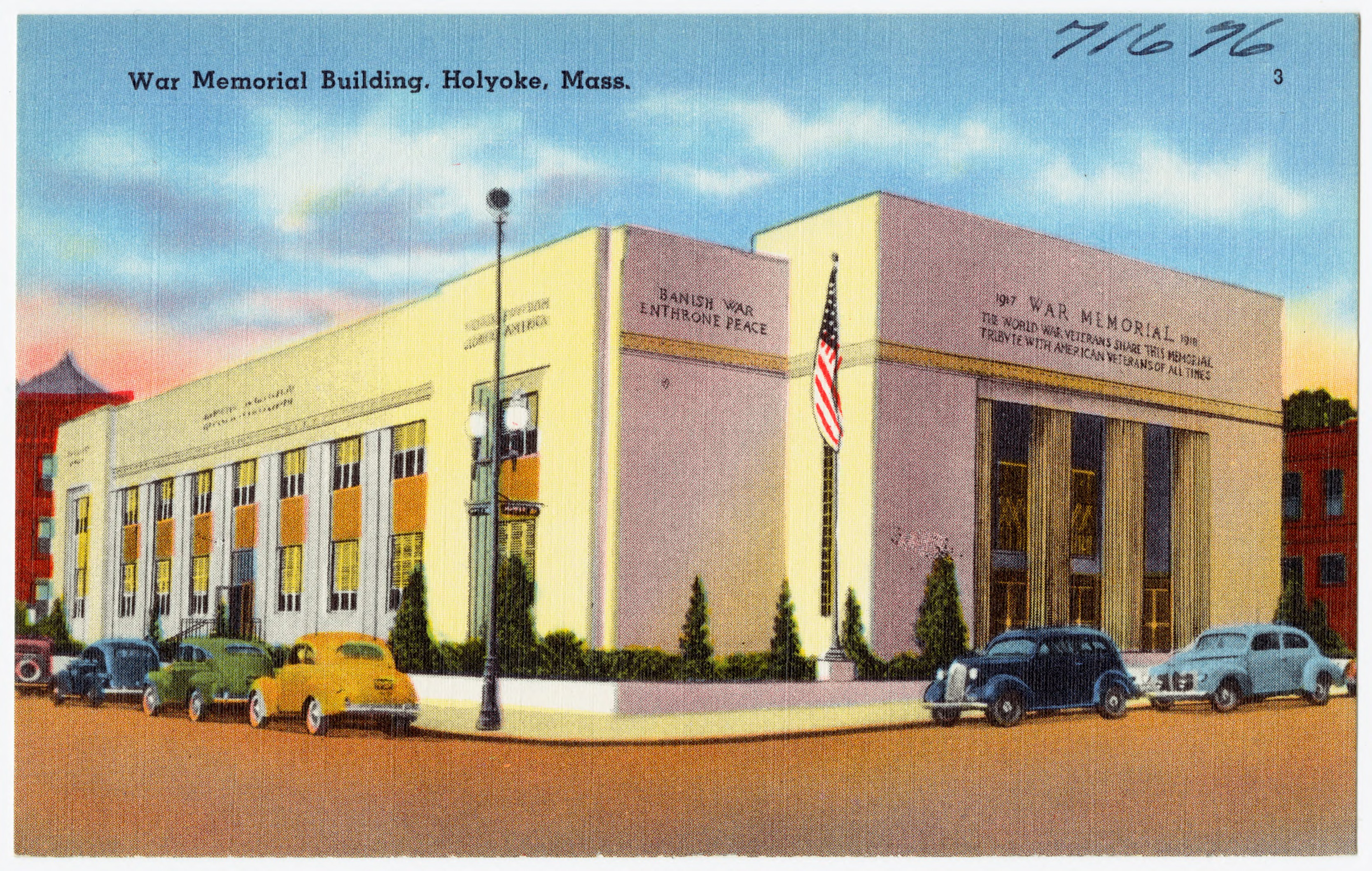
- Postcard view of the building

- Location within Massachusetts Location within the United States
- Location: 310 Appleton St., Holyoke, Massachusetts
- Coordinates: 42°12′19″N 72°36′39″W
- Built: 1936
- Architect: Franz and Cunniff
- Architectural style: Moderne
- NRHP reference No.: 100007663
- Added to NRHP: May 2, 2022

The War Memorial Building is a historic municipal building at 310 Appleton Street in Holyoke, Massachusetts. Built in 1936, it is a distinctive local example of Moderne architecture, and a memorial to the city's military veterans. It houses an auditorium as well as smaller meeting spaces and offices. The building was listed on the National Register of Historic Places in 2022.

== Description and history ==
Holyoke's War Memorial Building is located in the city's downtown area, at the western corner of Appleton and Maple Streets. It is a large two-story structure, its street-facing facades finished in Indiana limestone. The main facade, facing Appleton Street, has a projecting entry pavilion with three central bays articulated by fluted square columns set in antis. A band of Greek key and rosette styling extends above the second story, visually separating a blind parapet which obscures the flat roof. The interior of the building is asymmetrical, with the auditorium space occupying the western portion of the building, and two stories of offices and meeting spaces on the east side. Many original features and finishes remain in the interior, including elaborate wood and plaster in the auditorium and the memorial room.

The city began planning for a permanent veterans' memorial following World War I, establishing a fund for the purpose in 1929. Construction of this building was largely done with funding and support from the Public Works Administration, a federal Depression-era jobs relief program. It was designed by architect Fred Henry Franz and its construction was overseen by engineer James Cunniff, and was completed in 1937. It is one of only two Moderne buildings in the city -- the other is its main post office.

== See also ==
- National Register of Historic Places listings in Hampden County, Massachusetts
