= Thomas D. Page House =

Historic house in Massachusetts, United States

- U.S. National Register of Historic Places
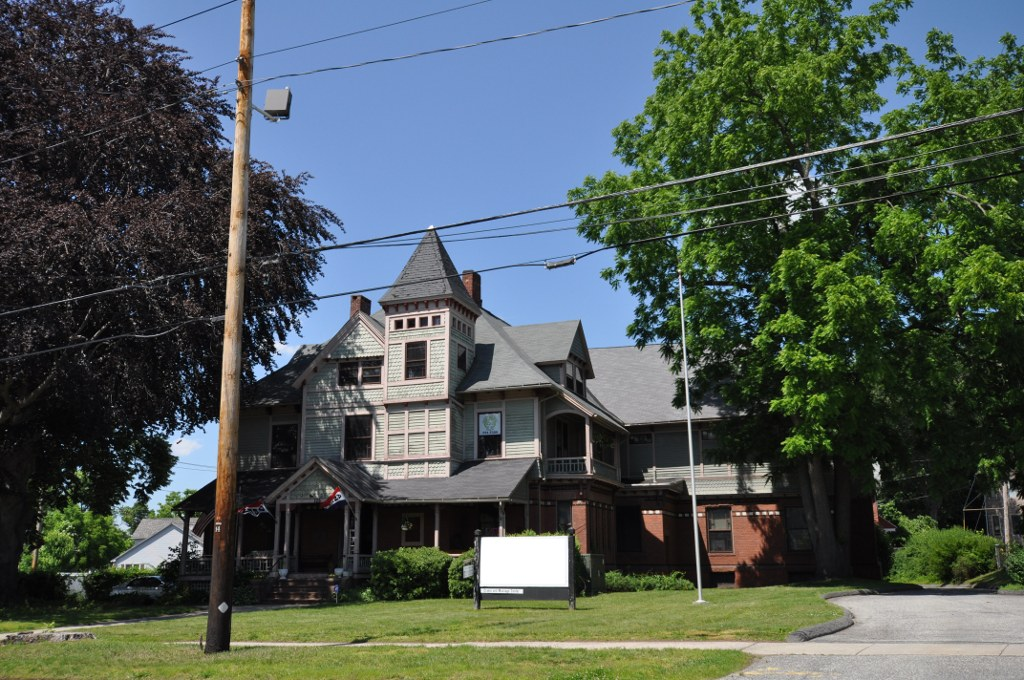

- Location within Massachusetts Location within the United States
- Location: 105 East St., Chicopee, Massachusetts, U.S.
- Coordinates: 42°9′22″N 72°34′39″W
- Area: Less than one acre
- Built: 1875; 1909
- Architectural style: Queen Anne
- Demolished: 2023
- NRHP reference No.: 87001782
- Added to NRHP: October 25, 1988

The Thomas D. Page House, also known later as the Belcher Lodge or the Chicopee Falls Masonic Temple, was a historic house in Chicopee, Massachusetts, United States. Built about 1875, it was a prominent local example of Queen Anne and Stick style architecture, built by one of the community's business leaders of the time. For many years it housed the local Masonic lodge. The house was listed on the National Register of Historic Places in 1988; as of 2024 the land is razed and lays empty.

== Description and history ==
The Thomas D. Page House was located in the Chicopee Falls neighborhood of Chicopee, at the northwest corner of East and Fuller Streets. It was a three-story wood-frame structure, with a hip roof and exterior finished in a combination of wooden clapboards and decoratively cut shingles. A two-story ell extended to the right from the bank of the main block. The exterior had the typical asymmetrical arrangement of porches, gables, and projections found in many Queen Anne houses, with a square tower near the center of the East Street facade, rising to a pyramidal tower. Portions of the tower had applied Stick style woodwork. The interior retained many features original to its construction, including builtin cabinets, wooden paneling, and flooring. Several of the fireplace surrounds were replaced in 1909 by the building's original owner, Thomas Page.

The house was built about 1875, and was the most elaborate example of Queen Anne styling in Chicopee. Thomas Page was an industrialist who came to Chicopee in 1867, and was involved in a number of manufacturing businesses. He owned patents to knitting machines, which he used in the production of cotton textiles. He later branched out into other businesses, including the early manufacture of bicycles, which eventually came to dominate the business. Page sold the house to the local Masonic lodge in 1909, which added an ell to the rear, and made other modest alterations to the interior. The building was in use by the Masons when it was listed on the National Register in 1988, but was last occupied by an antiques dealer.

A fire broke out at the Page House on February 3, 2018, causing a considerable amount of damage. The property would eventually be razed and lays empty as of July 2024.

== See also ==
- National Register of Historic Places listings in Hampden County, Massachusetts
