= Mechanic Street Cemetery =

Historic cemetery in Hampden County, Massachusetts, US

- U.S. National Register of Historic Places
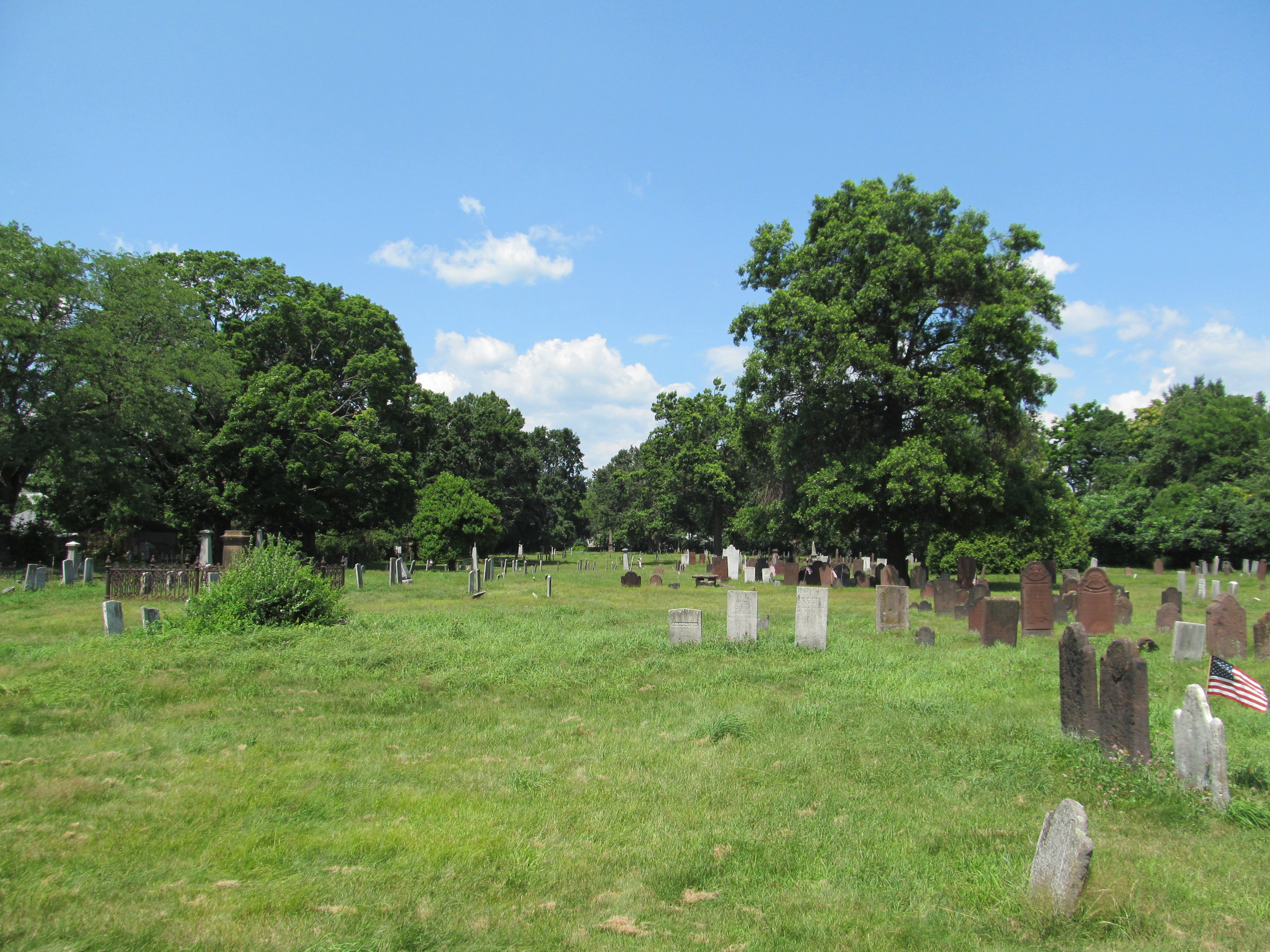
- Mechanic Street Cemetery (Old Burying Ground)

- Location within Massachusetts Location within the United States
- Location: Mechanic St., Westfield, Massachusetts
- Coordinates: 42°7′23″N 72°44′41″W
- Area: 4 acres (1.6 ha)
- Built: 1677
- Architect: multiple
- NRHP reference No.: 02000632
- Added to NRHP: June 26, 2002

The Mechanic Street Cemetery is a historic early cemetery on Mechanic Street in Westfield, Massachusetts. The 4-acre (1.6 ha) cemetery is the city's oldest, with the oldest documented grave dating to 1683. It was used as a burying ground until the late 19th century, although its use began to decline in the middle of the century, with the advent of the popular rural cemetery movement, which was reflected in Westfield with the establishment of the new Pine Hill Cemetery in 1842. No burials were recorded in the 20th century. Although the cemetery has been subjected to some maintenance work, it continues to suffer the effects of vandalism and weather. The cemetery was listed on the National Register of Historic Places in 2002.

== Description and history ==
The Mechanic Street Cemetery is located about two blocks east of Westfield's downtown commercial district. It occupies an irregularly shaped parcel that is almost completely surrounded by residential development on Mechanic, North Cherry, East Bartlett, and White Streets. It is accessed via an entrance lane on Mechanic Street, roughly opposite Church Street. A cast iron gate is mounted on elaborately carved granite posts at the beginning of the lane, which is maintained as grass, and there is a modern granite marker identifying it as "The Old Burying Ground".

The body of the cemetery lacks an overall plan. Graves are generally laid out in irregular rows, most with the gravestones facing east, a traditional practice in 17th and 18th-century burials. Some are organized into family plots with a large central marker, of which a few are ringed by iron fencing. The cemetery was filled roughly from east to west.

The cemetery was formally established by 1677, not long after Westfield's 1669 settlement. Interments include virtually all of Westfield's early settlers, as well as prominent individuals through its period of use. It was enlarged in 1827 in order to meet increased demand from the city's growing population. In 1842 the city opened Pine Hill Cemetery on the outskirts of town, in the fashionable rural cemetery style. Burials continued in the old burying ground, however, until about 1875, when they dropped off significantly in number. The entrance gate was added in 1894, and its grounds were otherwise completely surrounded by development by 1912. Periodic inventories of the cemetery, taken through the 20th century, have identified losses and damage to headstone, due to weather and vandalism.

== See also ==
- National Register of Historic Places listings in Hampden County, Massachusetts
