= Jacob Thompson House =

Historic house in Massachusetts, United States

- U.S. National Register of Historic Places
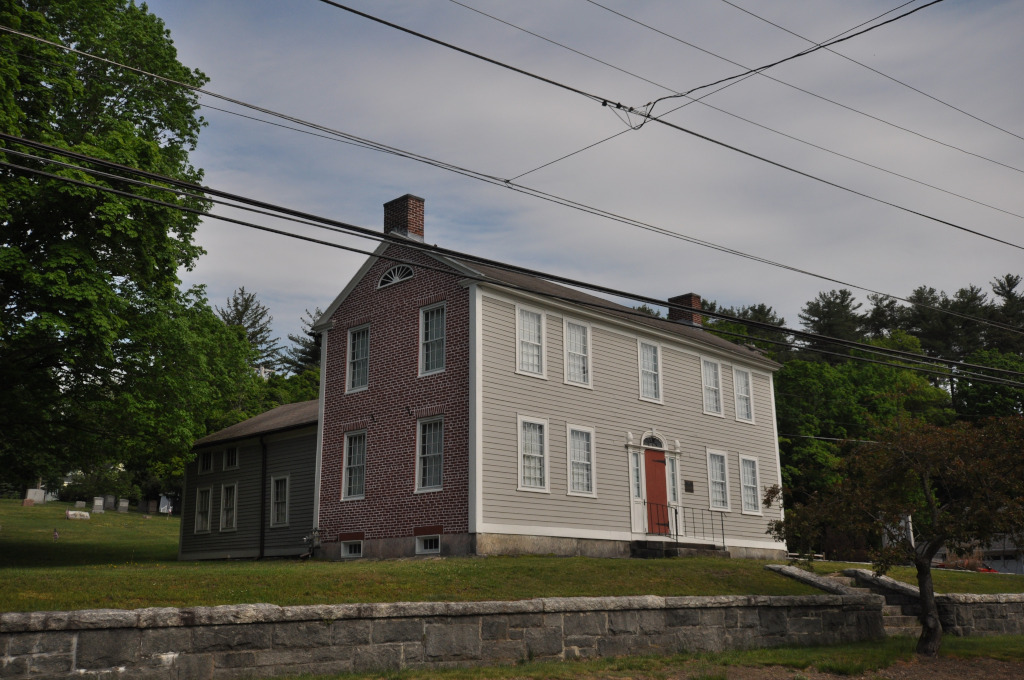

- Location within Massachusetts Location within the United States
- Location: 7 Main St., Monson, Massachusetts
- Coordinates: 42°6′31″N 72°18′59″W
- Architectural style: Federal
- NRHP reference No.: 100005078
- Added to NRHP: March 13, 2020

The Jacob Thompson House is a historic house museum at 7 Main Street in Monson, Massachusetts. Built c. 1811-13 for a farmer and lawyer, it is a rare local example of Federal style housing with brick ends. It is now owned by the local historical society, which operates it as a museum. It was listed on the National Register of Historic Places in 2020.

== Description and history ==
The Jacob Thompson House is located a short way north of Monson's town center, at the southwest corner of Main and Thompson Streets. It stands near the corner, in front of land formerly associated with it that now forms Hillside Cemetery. The main block of the house is a 2 1/2-story wood-frame construction, with a side-gable roof and end chimneys incorporated into brick end walls. The front facade is five bays wide, with a symmetrical arrangement of sash windows around the center entrance. The entrance has a fine Federal style surround, with sidelight windows and an original period half-oval transom window. The interior is arranged in a traditional center hall manner, with single rooms on either side of the center hall, where the stairs to the second floor are located. A 1 1/2-story ell extends to the rear, housing additional rooms.

The house was built sometime between 1811 and 1813, when Jacob Thompson, a native of nearby Holland, Massachusetts, moved to the town. Thompson, who had owned a gunpowder mill in Holland, was primarily active as a farmer and lawyer in Monson, acquiring a substantial amount of land. Much of the land directly associated with the house was sold by his son Addison for use as a cemetery, and it is believed that the house itself came into the hands of the cemetery after his death in 1884. The town sold the house to the local historical society in 1998, which has restored it for use as a house museum.

== See also ==
- National Register of Historic Places listings in Hampden County, Massachusetts
