= Hampden County Training School =

- U.S. National Register of Historic Places
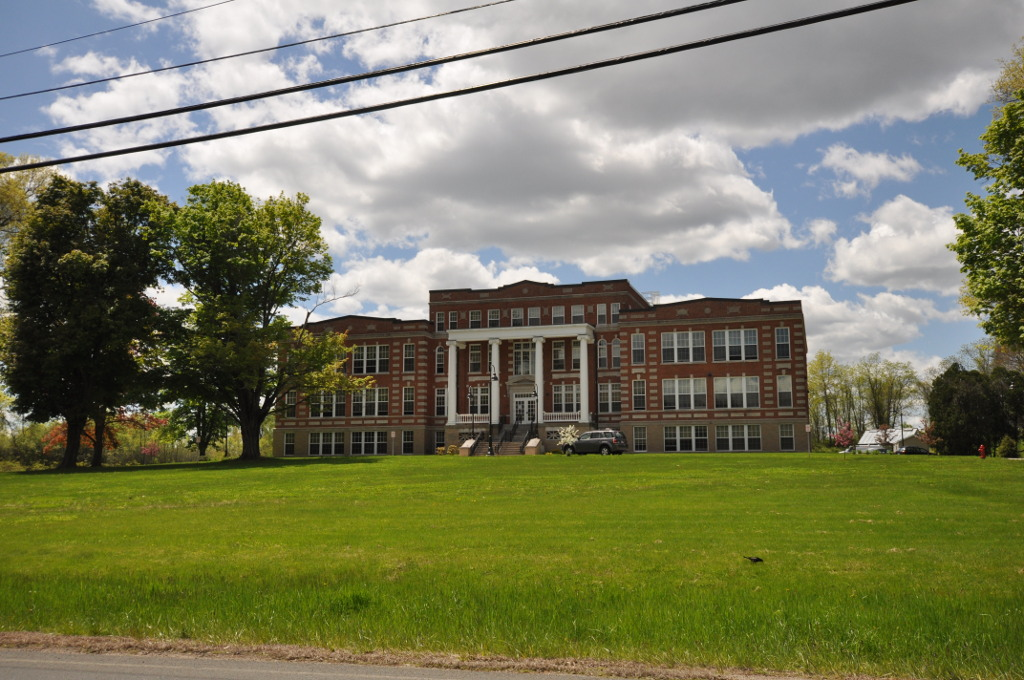

- Location within Massachusetts Location within the United States
- Location: 702 S. Westfield St., Agawam, Massachusetts
- Coordinates: 42°2′39″N 72°40′21″W
- Area: 6.9 acres (2.8 ha)
- Built: 1916
- Architect: George P. B. Alderman
- Architectural style: Classical Revival
- NRHP reference No.: 100002781
- Added to NRHP: August 16, 2018

The Hampden County Training School was a reformatory school for boys at 702 South Westfield Street in Agawam, Massachusetts. Established in 1916, it operated until 1972, providing training agriculture and vocational skills to its charges. In 2010, the state sold the property to a veterans support organization for conversion to residences. The facility opened in 2017. The property was listed on the National Register of Historic Places in 2018.

== Description and history ==
The former Hampden County Training School property is located in a rural-residential area of southern Agawam, on 6.9 acres (2.8 ha) on the west side of South Westfield Road. A broad lawn and semicircular drive front the main building, a brick Classical Revival building. It has a central section functionally four stories in height, its ground floor functioning visually as a basement. Flanking this section are similar wings that are three stories in height. Banks of windows are separated by brick piers punctuated occasionally by concrete tablets. The main entrance is framed by a massive two-story Ionic portico.

The state first established schools for juvenile delinquents and truants in the mid-19th century, although such offenders were often sent to local poor houses. In 1880 a county school for delinquents was established for Hampden County in Springfield. Increasing urbanization surrounding that school meant that there was call to relocate the facility by the mid 1910s. The present facility was built in 1916 on what had been farmland, to a design by regionally noted architect George P. B. Alderman. The school's design, with dormitories on the top floor, was judged obsolete at the time of its construction, and conditions at the school were never particularly good. At the state level there were regular calls for reorganization of facilities for delinquents, including the closure of county schools such as this one. It was finally closed in 1972.

In 1984 the campus was converted for use as a police training academy, a role it fulfilled into 2005.

== See also ==
- National Register of Historic Places listings in Hampden County, Massachusetts
