= Joseph Dewey House =

Historic house in Massachusetts, United States

- U.S. National Register of Historic Places
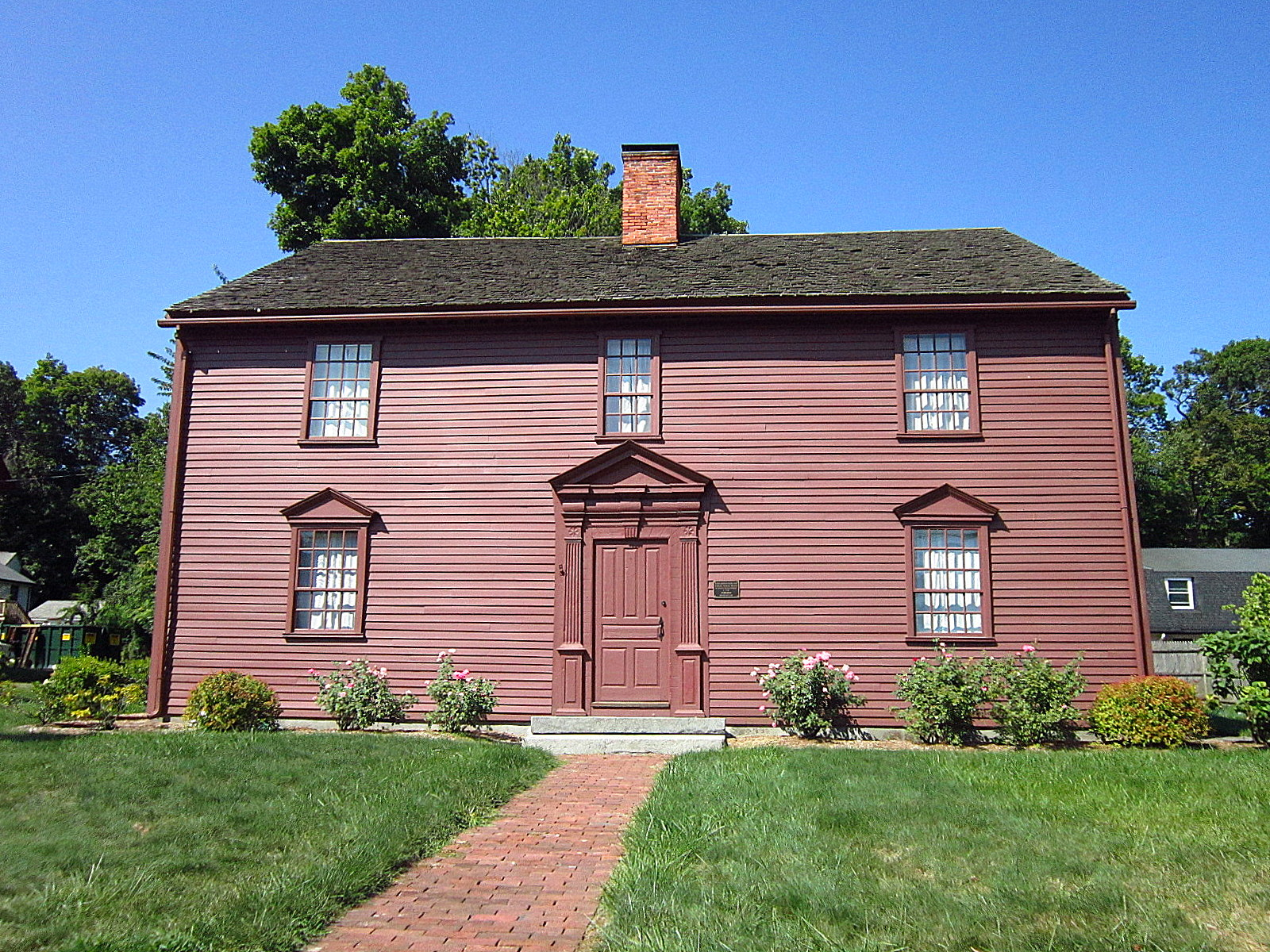
- Joseph Dewey House

- Location within Massachusetts Location within the United States
- Location: Westfield, Massachusetts
- Coordinates: 42°6′42″N 72°45′49″W
- Area: less than one acre
- Built: c. 1735
- Architectural style: Georgian
- NRHP reference No.: 01000746
- Added to NRHP: July 27, 2001

The Joseph Dewey House is a historic house museum at 87 South Maple Street in Westfield, Massachusetts. Built about 1735, it is one of the city's few surviving pre-Revolutionary buildings. It is now maintained as a museum property by the local historical society. The property was listed on the National Register of Historic Places in 2001.

== Description and history ==
The Joseph Dewey House is located south of downtown Westfield, on the west side of South Maple Street (United States Route 202). It is a wood-frame structure, 2 1/2 stories in height, with a gable roof, central chimney, and clapboarded exterior. Its main facade is three bays wide, with a center entrance flanked by pilasters set on tall paneled blocks, and topped by a frieze and gabled pediment. The flanking first-floor windows are also topped by gabled lintels.

The house was built in about 1735 for Joseph Dewey, whose family had been living in the Westfield area since the mid-17th century. Dewey was a local farmer who was also involved in local politics. His grandson Benjamin bought the house later in the 18th century, and added a gristmill and sawmill to his property. He enlarged the house and added Federal style details. The house remained in the Dewey family until 1847. The property then went through a succession of owners, including a several-year period in which a Dewey descendant owned it. The mills were sold off, and redeveloped by the papermaker Crane & Co.

In 1873 the property was purchased by Emma Jane Turner, and it remained in her family for about 100 years. In the 1970s, under threat of demolition, it was acquired by the West Hampden Historical Society, moved to its present location, and carefully restored to its early colonial state. It is now operated by the society as a house museum.

== See also ==
- National Register of Historic Places listings in Hampden County, Massachusetts
