= Swetland-Pease House =

Historic house in Massachusetts, United States

- U.S. National Register of Historic Places
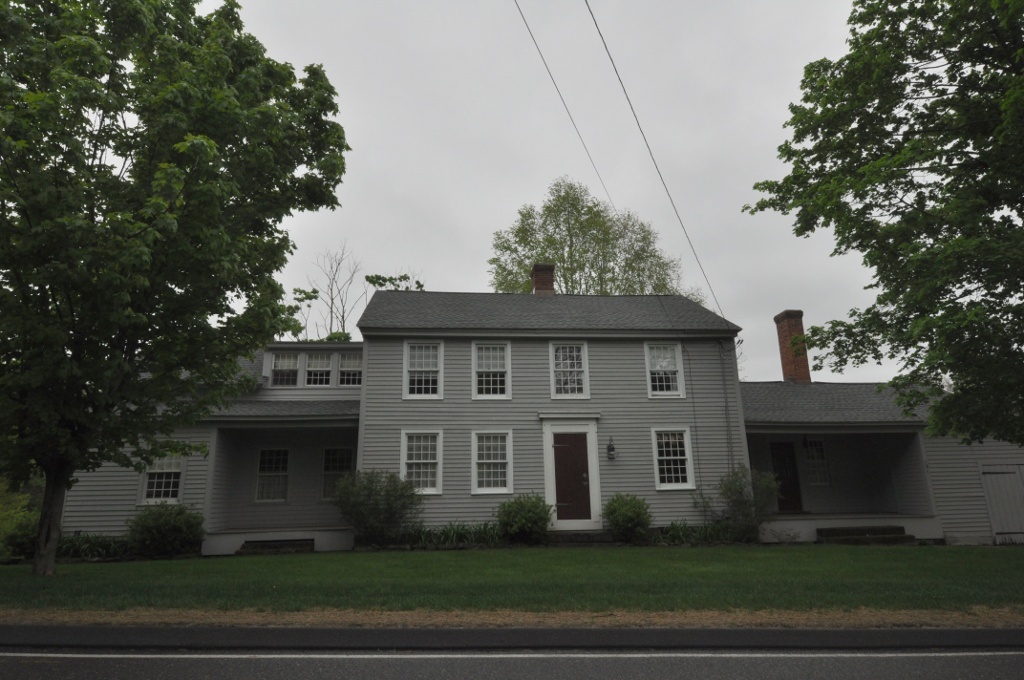

- Location within Massachusetts Location within the United States
- Nearest city: East Longmeadow, Massachusetts
- Coordinates: 42°2′38″N 72°29′41″W
- Area: 1.32 acres (0.53 ha)
- Built: 1793
- Architectural style: Federal
- NRHP reference No.: 80000505
- Added to NRHP: April 9, 1980

The Swetland-Pease House is a historic house at 191 Pease Road in East Longmeadow, Massachusetts. Probably built about 1793, it is one of a small number of surviving 18th-century houses in the town, and is one of its best-preserved. It was listed on the National Register of Historic Places in 1980.

== Description and history ==
The Swetland-Pease House is set on the north side of Pease Road, at its junction with Old Farm Road, in a rural-suburban area of southeastern East Longmeadow. The main house is a 2 1/2-story wood-frame structure, four bays wide, with a side-gable roof, clapboard siding, and a foundation of local sandstone. It is flanked on either side by 1 1/2-story ells that are of 19th-century construction. The main entrance is set in the second bay from the left, framed by narrow Federal-style pilasters and topped by a simple entablature. A single chimney rises in the nearly the center of the block, and in the right-side ell. The interior retains many features original to its construction, including four fireplaces, wide flooring, glasswork in the dining room, and original wainscoting.

The house was probably built about 1793 by Benjamin Swetland; its first recorded owner (in 1831) was Eli Swetland, and it was later for some time in the Pease family, for whom Pease Road is named. Marvin Pease, one of its owners, was prominent in local civic affairs, serving on the school committee and as town assessor. The house is one of two documented 18th-century houses in East Longmeadow; the other, the Elijah Burt House, is also on the National Register.

== See also ==
- National Register of Historic Places listings in Hampden County, Massachusetts
