= Polish National Home (Chicopee, Massachusetts) =

- U.S. National Register of Historic Places
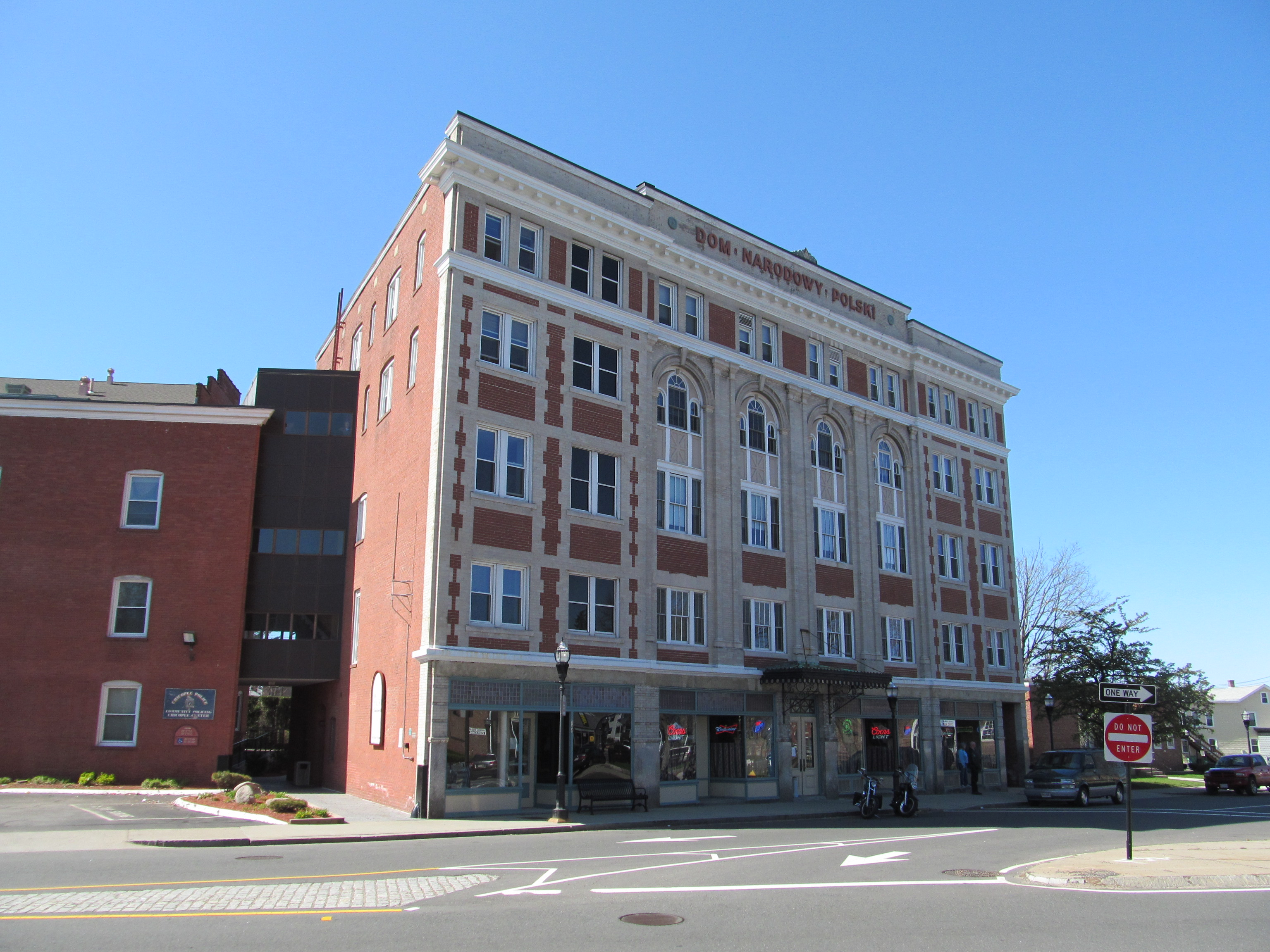
- Polish National Home

- Location within Massachusetts Location within the United States
- Location: 136-144 Cabot St., Chicopee, Massachusetts
- Coordinates: 42°8′41″N 72°36′35″W
- Area: less than one acre
- Built: 1912
- Architect: Dion, George
- Architectural style: Colonial Revival, Other
- NRHP reference No.: 80000475
- Added to NRHP: November 14, 1980

The Polish National Home, also known as Dom Polski Narodowy, is a historic social club at 136-144 Cabot Street in Chicopee, Massachusetts. It was built in 1914 for $55,000. It functioned as a community center for the large Polish immigrant community, providing a variety of community services (including English language lessons and citizenship classes), and served as transient housing for Polish migrants. In 1924 a second building was added immediately adjacent, which included recreational facilities, including a bowling alley and billiards hall. This building was remodeled in 1949. The facility was added to the National Register of Historic Places in 1980. Its upper floors have been converted into housing, with retail spaces on the ground floor of the 1914 building.

== Description and history ==
The former Polish National Home buildings stand prominently at the junction of Cabot and Center Streets in central Chicopee. The main building is of steel frame construction, its five stories finished on the outside with brick, limestone, and stucco. The ground floor is divided into four storefronts, each with a recessed entry flanked by display windows, as well as a central main entrance, and a secondary entrance at the right end. The main entrance is sheltered by a wrought iron marquee. The second through fourth floors are eight bays wide, with a cornice band separating the fourth and fifth floors. The outer bays in this section have paired sash windows set in openings with limestone quoins, while the central four bays are articulated by stone pilasters, and have three-part windows which are rounded on the fourth floor. The fifth floor has paired sash windows in each bay, and the building is crowned by an elaborate projecting cornice. Set to the left of the main building at a recess, and connected to it by bridges, is a more utilitarian three-story brick building.

The Polish National Home was organized in 1910 as a fraternal service organization catering to the needs of the local Polish immigrant and Polish-American communities. Chicopee had seen an explosive growth in its Polish population, rising from just 200 in 1885 to over 9,000 in 1914. The main building, erected in 1914, provided social meeting spaces, a library, and assembly hall in support of these endeavours. The adjacent building was built in 1924 to a design by local architect George Dion, to provide athletic facilities for the organization members' use.

== See also ==
- National Register of Historic Places listings in Hampden County, Massachusetts
