= Laverock =

Laverock is the Scots word for a lark. It may refer to:

- Laverock, Pennsylvania, a small unincorporated community in the United States
- HMS Laverock (1913), a destroyer of the British Royal Navy
- Charles Laverock Lambe, British air marshal
- Hugh Laverock (martyr)
- Lily Laverock, Scottish journalist, impresario and suffragist
- Laverock Ha, and early name for Larkhall, South Lanarkshire, Scotland

== See also ==
- Caerlaverock, a place in Scotland
- Lavernock, a hamlet in the Vale of Glamorgan, Wales
- Laverick, a surname
- Laverack, or English settler
- Laverack (surname)
