= Monson Center Historic District =

Historic district in Massachusetts, United States

- U.S. National Register of Historic Places
- U.S. Historic district
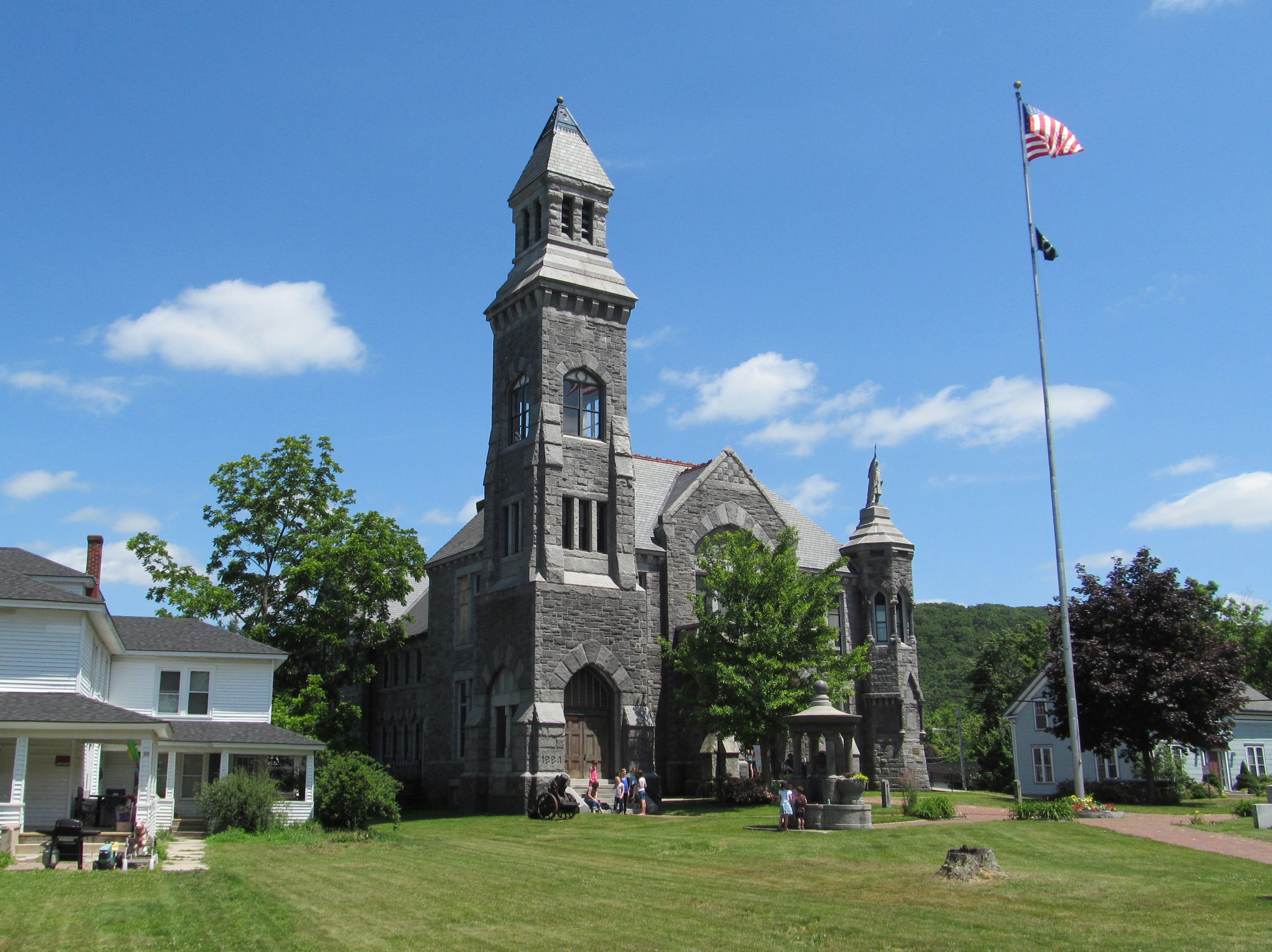
- Memorial Hall

- Location within Massachusetts Location within the United States
- Location: Jct. of Main and Cushman Sts., Monson, Massachusetts
- Coordinates: 42.0977°N 72.31383°W
- Area: 3.4 acres (1.4 ha)
- Architectural style: Late Victorian, Romanesque, Federal
- NRHP reference No.: 90000788
- Added to NRHP: May 6, 1991

The Monson Center Historic District is a historic district encompassing the historic 19th century economic and civic heart of Monson, Massachusetts, a small town in eastern Hampden County. The district was listed on the National Register of Historic Places in 1991.

== History ==
When the town of Monson, Massachusetts was first settled in the 18th century, its center was located at the junction of High and Main Streets; Main Street was the primary north–south road in the area, connecting Monson to Palmer, Massachusetts and Stafford, Connecticut. Although this was at first a natural center for commerce and civic activity, the economic focus moved about a mile (1.6 km) south of that area with the establishment of the Norcross Tavern. In the early years of the 19th century Main Street was developed, with houses lining the road nearer the old center and buildings of the Monson Academy south of those. A small commercial area was located further south, separated from the traditional center by a large straw-hat factory, which served the workers of that business and a few small textile mills. This area grew during the second half of the 19th century to become the new center of Monson.

The district includes nine buildings, all of which front on Main Street (MA Route 32); five of these structures contribute to the district's significance. The most prominent of these are the Methodist Church (the town's second church, built 1850 in the Greek Revival style), the Universalist Church (stone, 1889), and Memorial Town Hall (1885, separately listed on the National Register). The other two contributing buildings are the Universalist Parsonage (an 1820 Federalist house), and the Noble Block, a c. 1890 Victorian-era commercial block. Also contributing to the district are two cannons located on the lawn of Memorial Hall, and Cushman Fountain, built in 1886 and moved to its present site early in the 20th century.

Less well preserved are several commercial buildings, which are non-contributing properties: the Woodbine Block (172 Main Street, c. 1880) and 172-176 Main Street (c. 1885), both of which now have more modern exterior cladding, and the Nichols Block at 178 Main Street, whose facade was converted to modern brick and synthetic cladding in the 20th century.

== See also ==
- National Register of Historic Places listings in Hampden County, Massachusetts
