= Kathleen Hildreth Barnes =

American therapist

- Born: November 11, 1952 (age 73); Springfield, Massachusetts
- Occupations: University administrator, pediatric physical therapist

Academic work
- Discipline: Physiotherapy

Kathleen Hildreth Barnes (born October 11, 1952) is an American pediatric physical therapist and a university administrator. She served as interim president and interim provost at Endicott College, where she spent twenty-eight years.

== Early life and education ==
Barnes was born in Springfield, Massachusetts and lived in Monson, Massachusetts until her family relocated to Old Saybrook, Connecticut, in 1962. She went to Old Saybrook Senior High School for her high school education. Later, she attended Endicott College in Beverly, Massachusetts, to complete her A.A. in Liberal Arts in May 1972. Barnes attended Quinnipiac University in Hamden, Connecticut, to complete her B.S in Physical Therapy in May 1976. During her BS education, she played a leadership role in student clubs and organizations. Later, Barnes earned her M.S in Physical Therapy from the University of Indianapolis in May 1998. She completed her Ph.D. from the Union Institute & University, Cincinnati, Ohio, in Arts and Sciences in May 2009.

== Career ==
Upon her graduation, Barnes started her professional journey while serving in physical therapy. She was licensed to practice in Connecticut and Rhode Island, and Providence Plantations. She has been involved with the state chapters of the American Physical Therapy Association since graduation and the neuro-development treatment therapist group. Barnes was active in the Rehabilitation Engineering and Assistive Technology Society of North America and held several leadership positions within the organization between 1988 and 2004. She was appointed by the Governor of the Commonwealth of Massachusetts. Barnes served as a member and then chair of the Board of Allied Health Professions from 2001 to 2010. Kathleen Barnes has had a successful career in physical therapy as a pediatric physical therapist at Meeting Street School in Providence, Rhode Island, North Shore Consortium in Beverly, Massachusetts, and CAST, now located in Wakefield, Massachusetts. As of 2022, she is licensed to practice in the Commonwealth of Massachusetts and Maine.

Besides physical therapy, Barnes also pursued her career in higher education in January 1993 at Endicott College. She has worked for 28 years at the college, including teaching and advising. Barnes began as the Academic Coordinator for Clinical Education for the Physical Therapist Assistant Program, then Director of the Program, followed by leadership roles in the School of Arts and Sciences, The Division of Academic Success, Senior Vice President, Interim President, and Interim Provost. Currently, she is a member of the Registry, the Gold Standard for Interim Placements in Higher Education.

== Awards ==
- Women of Impact & Bright Light Award – Endicott College (2017, 2018, 2019)
- Service Award - Endicott College (2003, 2008, 2013, 2018)
- Distinguished Service Award - Federation of State Boards in Physical Therapy (FSBPT) (2010)
- Distinguished Service Award - Rehabilitation Engineering and Assistive Technology Society of North America (RESNA) (1999 & 2002)
- Excellence in Teaching Award - Endicott College Alumni Council (1998)
- Association of Independent Colleges & Universities in Massachusetts (AICUM) – College Presidents (2018 – 2019)
- Association of Higher Education and Disability (AHEAD) (2006 – Present)
- American Physical Therapy Association (APTA) (1975 – Present)
- Commonwealth Coast Conference (CCC) – College Presidents (2018 – 2019)
- Federation of State Boards in Physical Therapy (FSBPT) (1993 – Present)
- Life Science Consortium of the North Shore (2018 – 2019)
- National Academic Advising Association (NACADA) (2008 – Present)
- National Tutoring Association (NTA) (2010 – Present)
- Northeast Consortium of Colleges & Universities in Massachusetts (NECCUM) – College Presidents (2018 – 2019)
- North Shore Technology Council – College Presidents (2018 – 2019)
