= W.N. Flynt Granite Co. =

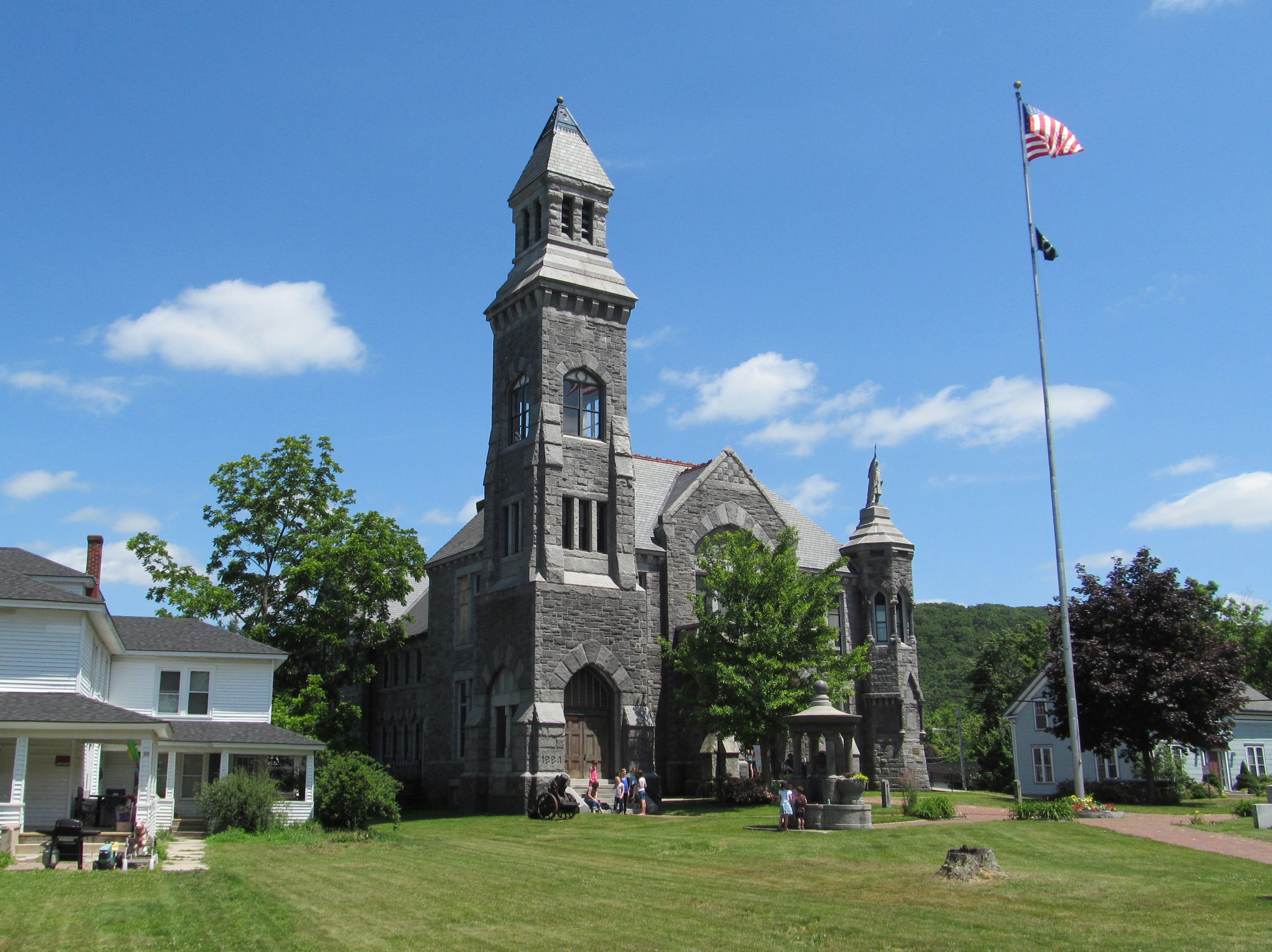
Memorial Town Hall in Monson, built from Flynt Company granite

W.N. Flynt Granite Co. was a granite quarry that opened in 1809 in Monson, Massachusetts, to provide granite for new construction at the Springfield Armory. In 1825, Rufus Flynt acquired the property, and began commercial quarrying with five employees. Flynt's son, William N. Flynt, took control of the company in 1839, and significantly expanded the quarrying operations. In 1875, a two mile long spur track was constructed to connect the quarry to the New London Northern Railroad in Monson. By 1888, the company employed over 200 workers, and produced about 30,000 tons of granite per year. By 1900, the quarry employed nearly 500 and was one of the largest employers in Monson. The quarry closed in 1935.

Many public buildings in Monson and the surrounding communities were constructed of Flynt granite, but the quarry also shipped granite for buildings in Boston, New York, Chicago, and even as far as Kansas and Iowa. Notable buildings include Monson's Memorial Town Hall, the Hampden County Courthouse in Springfield, Holyoke City Hall, St. Francis Xavier Church in Manhattan, the Boston & Albany Railroad depots in Springfield, Palmer, and Boston, the Isabella Home in New York City, and the now-demolished Walker Hall at Amherst College.
