= Conant Brook Dam =

Coordinates: 42°04′24″N 72°17′28″W

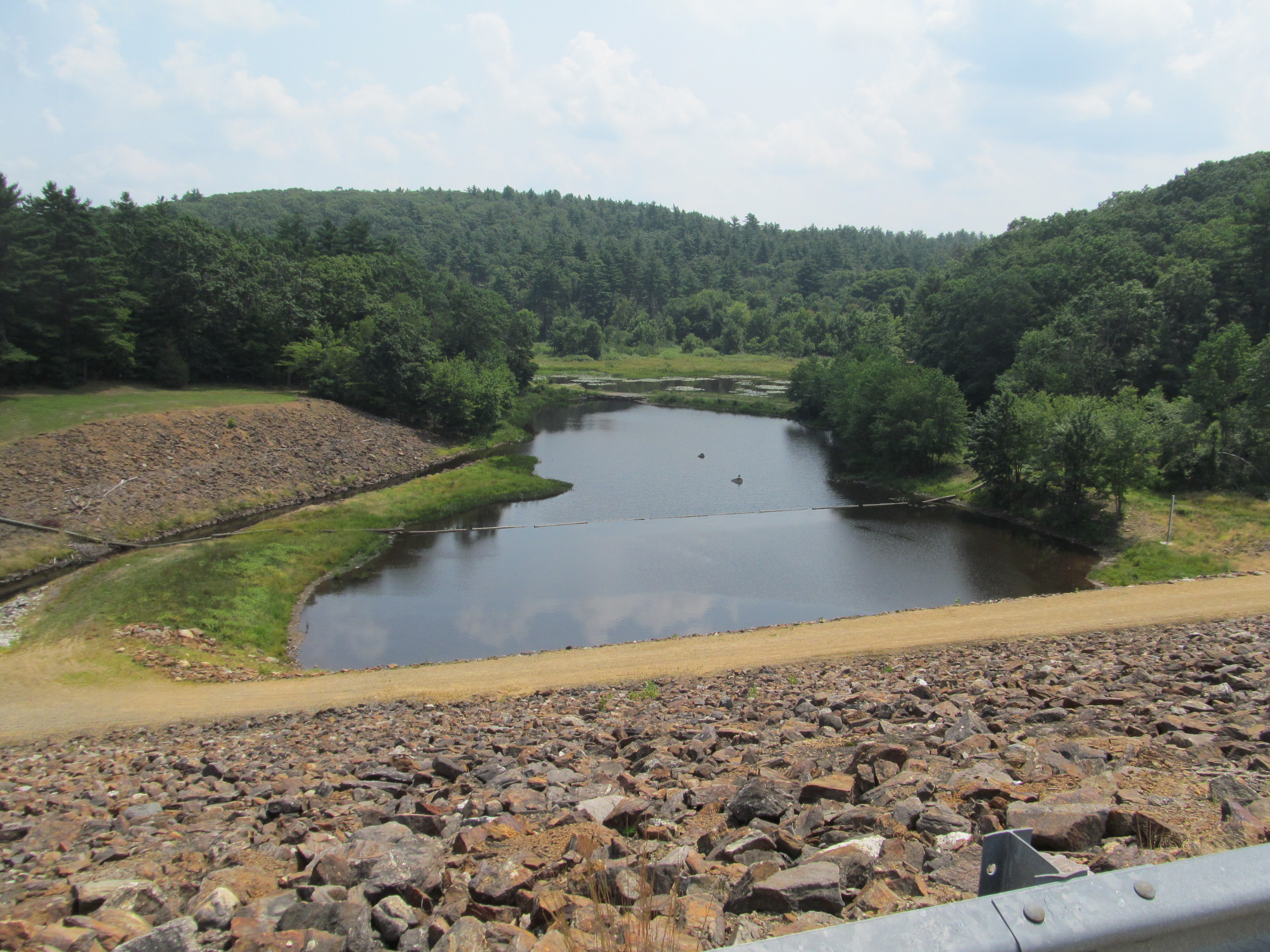
- Conant Brook Dam
- Official name: Conant Brook Dam
- Location: Monson, Massachusetts
- Construction began: 1964
- Opening date: 1966
- Operator(s): Army Corps of Engineers

Dam and spillways
- Impounds: Conant Brook
- Height: 85 ft (21.03 m)
- Length: 1,050 ft (979.9 m)

Reservoir
- Creates: Conant Brook flood control reservoir

The Conant Brook Dam is located on Conant Brook in Monson, Massachusetts, about 7.4 miles (11.9 km) upstream from the confluence of Conant Brook and the Quaboag River. It is approximately 15 miles (24 km) east of Springfield, Massachusetts.

Designed and constructed by the United States Army Corps of Engineers, this dam substantially reduces flooding along the Quaboag, Chicopee, and Connecticut rivers. Construction of the project began in 1964 with completion in 1966 at a cost of US$2,950,530.

The Conant Brook Dam is located within the Chicopee River watershed and is part of the Connecticut River basin. Access to the site is available from State Route 32 and State Route 19.

== Description ==
The project consists of a rolled earth and rock fill dam with stone slope protection 1,050 feet (320 m) long and 85 feet (26 m) high. There is one dike 900 feet (270 m) in length with a maximum height of 20 feet (6.1 m). Cut in rock, the spillway comprises a concrete weir 100 ft (30 m) in width. The weir's crest elevation is 14 feet (7.0 m) lower than the top of the dam. There is no permanent lake behind the dam. The flood storage area for the project, which is normally empty, stores floodwaters and covers 158 acres (0.64 km^{2}) in the town of Monson, Massachusetts. The entire project, including all associated lands, covers 456 acres (1.85 km^{2}). The Conant Brook Dam can store up to 1.3 billion US gallons (4,900,000 m^{3}) of water for flood control purposes. This is equivalent to 9.0 inches (230 mm) of water runoff covering its drainage area of 7.8 square miles (20 km^{2}).

The current Conant Brook Dam was in October 2005, when the reservoir reached 35 feet (11 m) deep at the inlet channel.

== Land use and recreation ==
The Army Corps of Engineers manages and preserves the land for flood control and passive recreation. There are 4.7 miles (7.6 km) of hiking/mountain biking/horseback riding trails that are located on the project lands. In addition, 1.7 miles (2.7 km) of service roads (closed to motor vehicles) cross the reservoir area and are open to non-motorized use. The main entrance and parking area are located on Wales Road in Monson, approx. 1-mile (1.6 km) east of State Route 32. An information kiosk is located here. Limited trailhead parking is also available at the gated ends of East Hill Road and Waterworks Road, and at the north end of the project off Munn Road, near the east end of the dike.

Camping is not permitted.
