= Edward Conard =

American businessman, author and scholar

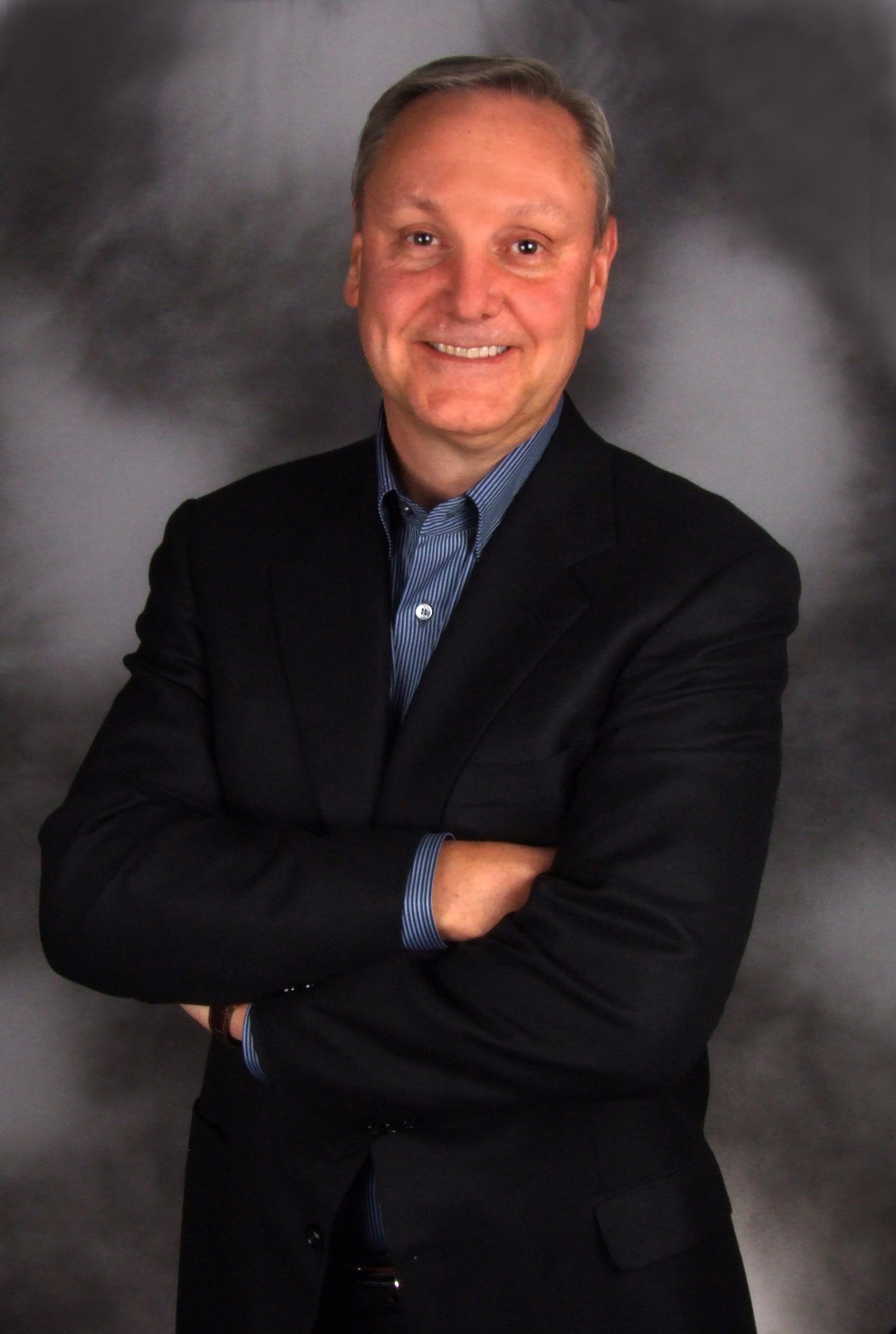
- Born: Edward Walter Conard
- Education: BSE University of Michigan at Ann Arbor: MBA 1982 Harvard Business School
- Employers: self - independent director: Managing Director at Bain Capital; Director at Wasserstein Perella; Manager at Bain & Company; Engineer at Ford Motor Company
- Spouse: Jill A. Davis (m. May 13, 2000)
- Website: www.edwardconard.com

Edward W. Conard is an American businessman, author and scholar. He is a New York Times-bestselling author of The Upside of Inequality: How Good Intentions Undermine the Middle Class and Unintended Consequences: Why Everything You've Been Told About the Economy Is Wrong; a contributor to Oxford University Press' United States Income, Wealth, Consumption, and Inequality, and the publisher of Macro Roundup. Conard is an adjunct fellow at the American Enterprise Institute for Public Policy Research. Previously, he was a managing director at Bain Capital, where he worked closely with former presidential candidate Mitt Romney.

== Early life and education ==
Conard grew up in the Detroit metropolitan area and graduated with honors from the University of Michigan with a BSE in Operations Research in 1978. He earned his MBA with distinction from Harvard Business School in 1982.

== Early career and Bain Capital ==
Prior to business school, Conard worked as an automotive engineer at Ford Motor Company. After graduating, he joined Bain & Company, the Boston-based global management-consulting firm, eventually becoming a vice president and leading the firm's industrial practice.

Conard left Bain in 1990 to become a director at Wasserstein Perella & Co., a boutique investment bank. At Wassernstein, he headed the firm's Transaction Development Group.

Conard was a managing director at Bain Capital, the head of Bain's New York office and the leader of its industrial practice. He joined the firm in 1993 prior to the firm raising $300 million of private equity. When Conard retired in 2007, Bain Capital managed $75 billion of capital and had offices in Boston, New York, San Francisco, London, Paris, Tokyo, Hong Kong, Shanghai, and Mumbai. His first acquisition was that of a pharmaceutical-related company, Waters Corporation, for half a billion dollars. That same company later rose to more than $23 billion in value.

While at Bain Capital, Conard took Waters Corporation, DDI, ChipPac, Innophos, and Sensata public and sat on their boards of directors. He retired from the board of Waters Corporation in 2024.

== Writing, speaking, and scholar career ==
Conard is the author of two top-ten The New York Times bestsellers: Unintended Consequences: Why Everything You've Been Told About the Economy Is Wrong and The Upside of Inequality: How Good Intentions Undermine the Middle Class; a contributor to Oxford University Press' United States Income, Wealth, Consumption, and Inequality, and the publisher of Macro Roundup, a daily summary of salient economic news. He became the tenth most searched author on Google in 2012 after publishing his first book. Conard joined the American Enterprise Institute as a visiting scholar in 2012. His work with AEI focuses on U.S. economic policy - in particular, on the effect of taxes, government policies, and finance on risk-taking and innovation.

=== Unintended Consequences ===
Conard published Unintended Consequences: Why Everything You've Been Told About the Economy Is Wrong in May 2012. The book was featured on the cover of the New York Times Sunday Magazine and went on to become a New York Times top ten non-fiction bestseller.

While The New York Times predicted the book might become "the most hated book of the year," leading economists such as Greg Mankiw, Andrei Shleifer, Steven Levitt, Nouriel Roubini, Tyler Cowen, and Glenn Hubbard publicly endorsed the book. In contrast to The New York Times, The Wall Street Journal called the book "a full throttle defense of economic dynamism…refreshing at a time when so many take the failure of capitalism for granted." The New York Times described Unintended Consequences as "…arguing that growing income inequality shows the economy is working." Timothy Noah, the author of The Great Divergence: America's Growing Inequality noted: "the biggest surprise, on opening Unintended Consequences, lies in discovering that this book isn't about income inequality at all." The book analyzes why the U.S. has outperformed other high-wage economies, explains the causes of the financial crisis, and makes recommendations for accelerating growth in its aftermath. Conard summarizes his book in a 23-minute video for The UP Experience.

Since its publication, Conard has made over 250 television appearances in which he has debated leading economists including Paul Krugman, Joe Stiglitz, Alan Krueger, Austan Goolsbee, and Jared Bernstein; journalists including Fareed Zakaria, Chris Hayes, and Andrew Ross Sorkin; and politicians such as Barney Frank, Howard Dean, and Eliot Spitzer. Conard also debated Jon Stewart for 33 minutes, one of Stewart's longest interviews. The video of the debate has received nearly 100,000 views. He has also written op-eds for The Wall Street Journal, The Washington Post, Foreign Affairs, Harvard Business Review, Fortune, and Politico, among others.

=== The Upside of Inequality ===
Conard published The Upside of Inequality: How Good Intentions Undermine the Middle Class in September 2016. The book debuted at #8 on The New York Times top ten non-fiction list and reached #1 on The New York Times business book list.

The Upside of Inequality was met with positive reviews, including former president of Harvard University and economist Larry Summers, a very tough critic on the other side of the aisle, blurbed "I profoundly disagree but respect the clarity with which he makes his case..." and called it "a very valuable contribution" that will "sharpen your thinking on critical economic issues." Noted economist Tyler Cowen who wrote on Bloomberg News: "Conard's central idea is that risk-bearing equity capital is the truly scarce asset in most economic situations, and economic analysis should adapt accordingly. He is very creative in seeing some of the implications of this view. I... found it very stimulating to ponder. It puts many of the pieces together in a new and different way." Harvard economist Greg Mankiw recommended Upside and interviewed Conard on C-SPAN. David Author, George Borjas, Larry Lindsey, and other prominent economists also praised it. National Review said the book is a "rousing defense of conservative beliefs about how markets and incentives drive prosperity."

=== The Economics of Inequality in High-Wage Economies ===
In 2021, Conard contributed the concluding chapter, “The Economics of Inequality in High-Wage Economies,” to the Oxford University textbook United States, Income Wealth, Consumption, and Inequality, which includes chapters by Emmanuel Saez, Jared Bernstein, Richard Burkhauser, Gerald Auten, and David Splinter among others. The chapter summarizes and updates the arguments Conard made in his previous books—that inequality has been predominantly earned and consequently accelerates the growth of middle-class incomes in the United States relative to other high-wage economies. The chapter references over 100 academic sources.

=== Macro Roundup ===
Since 2022, Conard and his research team have published a daily nonpartisan summary of the most salient economic news and research. The Roundup, which summarizes a variety of sources, makes Conard's ongoing research freely available to the public in a newsletter and searchable database (with entries that predate 2022).

== Political activities ==
In March 2011, Conard made a $1 million U.S. dollar contribution to the super PAC promoting Mitt Romney's candidacy in the 2012 U.S. Presidential Election through W Spann LLC, a shell corporation that rendered him anonymous and appeared to exist for the sole purpose of contributing to Romney's campaign. In August 2011, he came forward to quell the controversy that arose.

== Personal life ==
Conard is married to Jill Davis, an author and former writer for the Late Show with David Letterman.
