= Omega Metal Processing =

Coordinates: 42.0895°N 72.3148°W

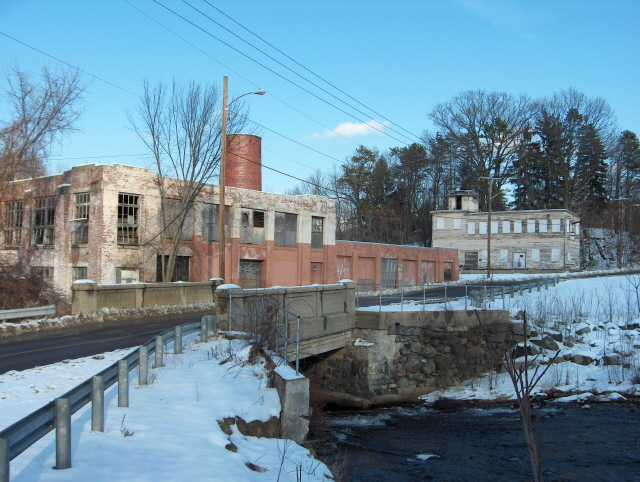
The Omega Metal Processing Plant as seen today.

Omega Metal Processing is an abandoned chemical processing plant in Monson, Massachusetts on Bliss Street. The two story brick building was built around 1850 for wool storage and sorting and was located on a 2.5 acre property. Starting in 1980, it was leased and operated by the Omega Processing Co. In an April 20, 1989 chemical spill, 2,800 gallons of cadmium cyanide were released into the Chicopee Brook, resulting in fish kills in the brook and the downstream Quaboag River. The plant closed as a result of the heavy costs and penalties incurred because of the spill, and was abandoned prior to the removal of hazardous material. The site was assessed under the Targeted Brownfields Assessment program of the EPA and cleared in 2005.

== See also ==
- S. F. Cushman Woolen Mill
