= Campaign Legal Center =

American nonprofit organization

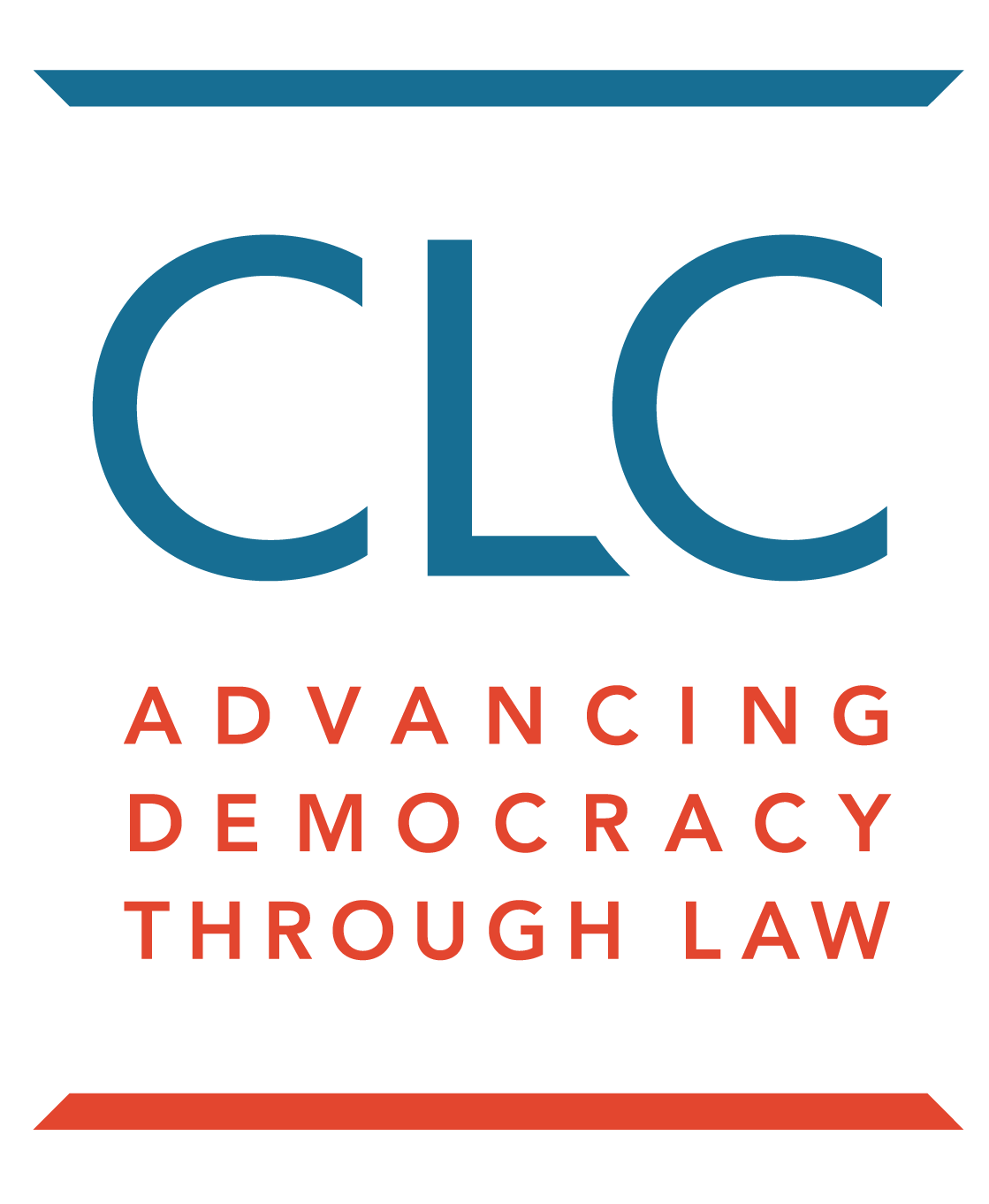
- Founded: January 2002
- Founder: Trevor Potter
- Type: 501(c)(3)
- Location: Washington, D.C.
- Region served: United States
- Key people: Paul M. Smith
- Revenue: $13.9 million (2024)
- Endowment: $21 million (2024)
- Website: campaignlegal.org

Campaign Legal Center (CLC) is a nonprofit 501(c)(3) legal organization in the United States. CLC was founded in 2002 by Trevor Potter. CLC engages in litigation and policy advocacy in areas including redistricting, ethics, campaign finance and voting and elections. The organization has been involved in court cases and legislative efforts.

== History ==
=== Founding and early years ===
Campaign Legal Center (CLC) was founded in 2002 by Trevor Potter, a former chairman of the Federal Election Commission. Initially, the organization operated as a three-person team, incubated at the University of Utah with the support of the Pew Charitable Trusts.

In 2003, CLC participated in the successful defense of the Bipartisan Campaign Reform Act. In 2004, CLC was a party to complaints filed with the Federal Election Commission (FEC) against groups like the Swift Boat Veterans for Truth and America Coming Together for trying to directly influence federal elections.

CLC was critical of former vice-presidential candidate John Edwards's use of charity organizations which he had founded, complaining they were being used chiefly to keep himself in the public eye in preparation for a possible 2008 presidential run.

The group filed an amicus brief in the 2007 landmark Supreme Court case Citizens United v. Federal Election Commission, unsuccessfully urging the court not to strike down a provision of McCain–Feingold which prevented unlimited political contributions to organizations not directly affiliated with federal candidates. The following year it again filed a brief with the court over a rule in the 2002 Bipartisan Campaign Reform Act that raised contribution limits when candidates faced a self-funding opponent; the group favored the rule, which was struck down by the court.

In 2010, CLC joined with another watchdog group, Democracy 21, in asking the Internal Revenue Service to investigate a tax exempt social welfare group run by Karl Rove.

=== 2011–20 ===
The group filed an amicus brief in 2011 on behalf of eight public interest groups in support of challenged provisions of Arizona's clean election law, the Citizens Clean Elections Act. After the Court struck down the provisions, a spokesperson for the group declared that the decision undermines "the integrity of our elections." Later that year, CLC highlighted concerns before the FEC that Stephen Colbert's satirical Super PAC, Americans for a Better Tomorrow, Tomorrow, had serious imitators exploiting the regulations on politicians with television contracts. The organization's President, Trevor Potter, served as Colbert's lawyer in establishing the PAC. In August, it asked the U.S. Justice Department to probe the behavior of W Spann LLC.

The group advocated for more legal restrictions on campaign giving and lobbying during the 2012 presidential primaries.

CLC attorneys represented Wisconsin voters in the 2017 Supreme Court case Gill v. Whitford. CLC's Paul Smith argued the case before the Court on October 3, 2017.

On October 30, 2017, the CLC released a fact-check explaining the legality of the Clinton campaign's financing of the Steele dossier and compared it to the illegality of the Trump campaign's acceptance of the offer of help from the Russian government at the 2016 Trump Tower meeting. Philip Bump, columnist for The Washington Post, explained why, because of the legal difference between an "expenditure" by a campaign and a "contribution" to a campaign, the Clinton campaign's action did not run afoul of Federal Election Commission laws (52 U.S. Code § 30121) forbidding foreign nationals from contributing to or aiding political campaigns, and that applies to any form of aid, not just cash donations. The dossier (prepared by a British citizen indirectly hired by the Clinton campaign and DNC) and the 2016 Trump Tower meeting (involving a direct offer of aid by the Russian government to the Trump campaign) are frequently contrasted and conflated in this regard.

In 2018, CLC launched a website for citizens with felony convictions to explain their voting rights in all 50 states. That same year, CLC filed several complaints with the FEC alleging illegal coordination between the Trump campaign and the National Rifle Association. CLC's Potter also appeared on Face the Nation and 60 Minutes in 2018 to discuss President Trump's potential campaign finance violations related to the hush money paid by Michael Cohen to Stormy Daniels. Prior to the 2018 election, CLC attorneys represented Native American voters in a case challenging North Dakota's voter ID law.

During the 2020 elections, CLC worked on voting issues in states across the U.S. amid the COVID-19 pandemic. It sued the states of Pennsylvania, New York, New Jersey, Rhode Island, and North Dakota over signature match rules that prevented voters with disabilities, racial minority voters, and voters who were non-Native English speakers from having their votes count at disproportionately high rates. Campaign Legal Center is a partner of VoteRiders.

In late July 2020, CLC filed an 81-page complaint with the FEC against the Trump re-election campaign, alleging that it used pass-through entities to conceal almost $170 million of campaign spending from the FEC.

=== 2021–present ===
In 2021, CLC sued the FEC for refusing to launch an investigation into Donald Trump's presidential campaign over allegations that it coordinated with a super PAC. CLC also filed a complaint with the FEC over the manner in which Ted Cruz's staff promoted his book One Vote Away: How a Single Supreme Court Vote Can Change History.

CLC supported the For the People Act. It was intended to expand voting rights, change campaign finance laws to reduce the influence of money in politics, ban partisan gerrymandering, and create new ethics rules for federal officeholders.

In October 2022, Trump's Save America PAC transferred $20 million to Trump's new MAGA Inc. Super PAC. In November 2022, the CLC filed a complaint with the FEC, alleging that the transfer was inappropriate inasmuch as Trump was already a presidential candidate when he made the transfer.
