= Hampden County Courthouse =

- U.S. National Register of Historic Places
- U.S. Historic district – Contributing property
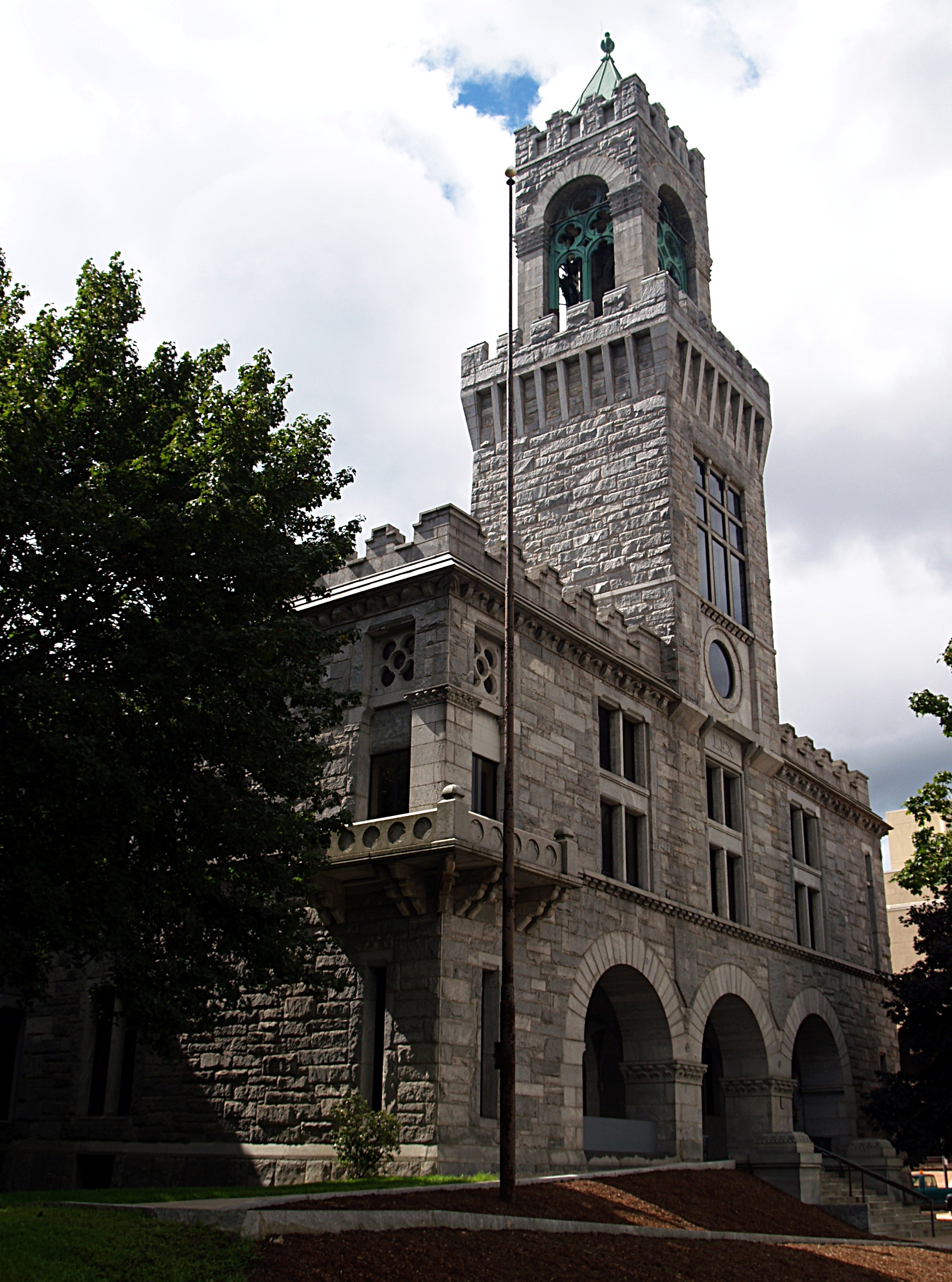

- Location within Massachusetts Location within the United States
- Location: Springfield, Massachusetts
- Coordinates: 42°6′1″N 72°35′20″W
- Built: 1871
- Architect: Henry Hobson Richardson; Shepley, Rutan and Coolidge
- Part of: Court Square Historic District (ID74000370)
- NRHP reference No.: 72000134

Significant dates
- Added to NRHP: February 1, 1972
- Designated CP: May 2, 1974

Hampden County Courthouse is a historic courthouse on Elm Street in Springfield, Massachusetts designed by Henry Hobson Richardson. This was the county's second courthouse. The first courthouse was a small meetinghouse structure built in 1740, and the second and was constructed in 1822, but by the 1860s, popular pressure was developing for a new proper courthouse. A grand jury indicted the county commissioners in 1869 for official misconduct since the courthouse did not have fireproof storage for the registry of deeds and the safekeeping of public records. This forced the county to build a new courthouse.

Construction began in late 1871, and the building was dedicated on April 28, 1874. The original building cost $214,068. The site, within the middle of a city block and measuring 160 by 90 feet, cost $75,716. The building is shaped roughly like the capital letter I, with the main facade emphasizing vertical lines, tall windows, and two tall dormers on either side of the bell tower. The facades were built of light gray Monson granite in rough-faced random ashlar masonry, with smooth-faced trim. The overall design reflects Richardson's evolution as a designer, showing development from the Brattle Square Church. In his 1972 treatise on Springfield history, Town Into City, Dr. Michael Frisch, professor of American Studies at University at Albany, described the structure as "the single most impressive building of the period [1840 to 1880], well symboliz[ing] Springfield's new importance in the life and economy of its region".

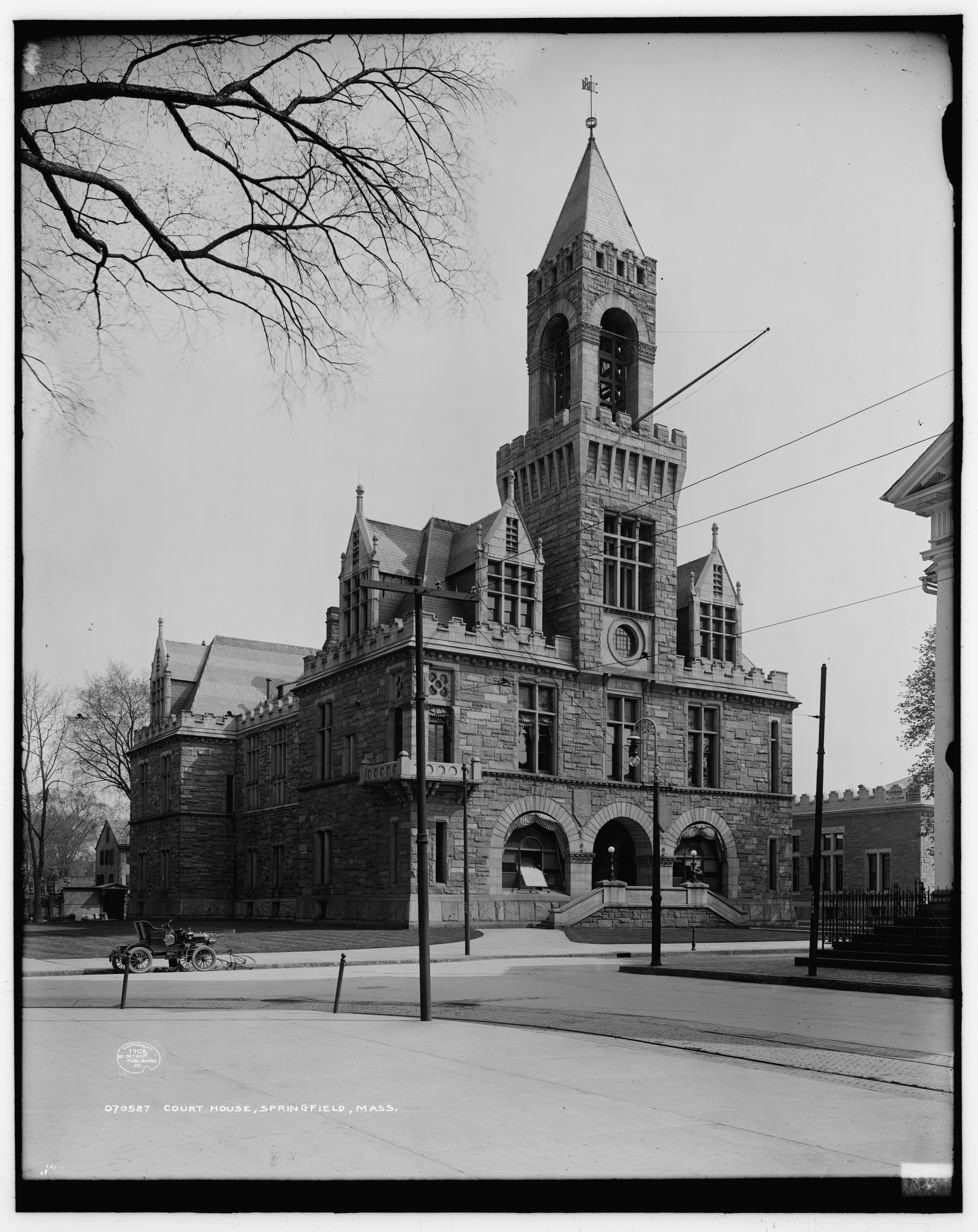
The courthouse as it appeared in 1908, before its renovation and removal of the dormers

The county's growth eventually pushed the probate court and registry of deeds into another building in 1907, and the county built a large addition to the building between 1908 and 1912. This was designed by Richardson's successor firm Shepley, Rutan and Coolidge. The sloping roof and high dormers were eliminated in the remodeling, making it difficult to visualize some parts of Richardson's original design.

The building was added to the National Register of Historic Places in 1972. Today, it houses the juvenile and Western Division of the Massachusetts Housing Court. The Courthouse is part of the Court Square Historic District.

== Gallery ==
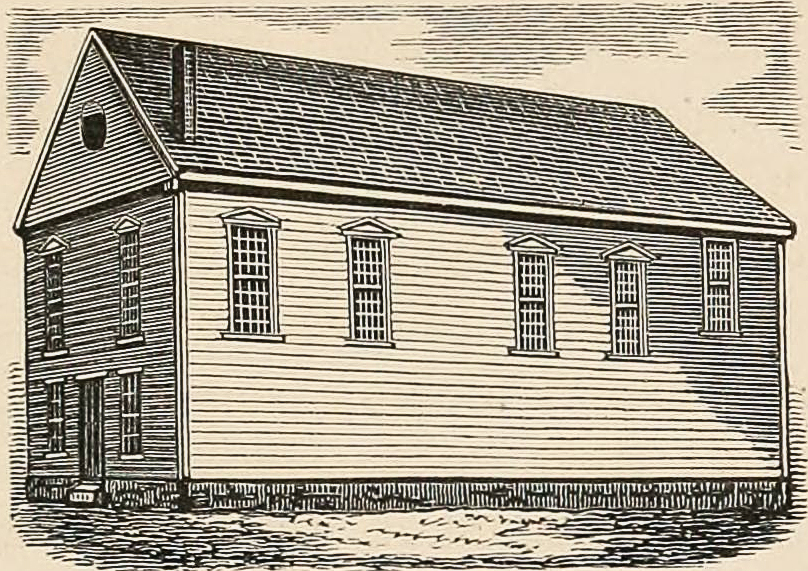
The first courthouse built in Springfield in 1740, when it was the county seat of Hampshire County

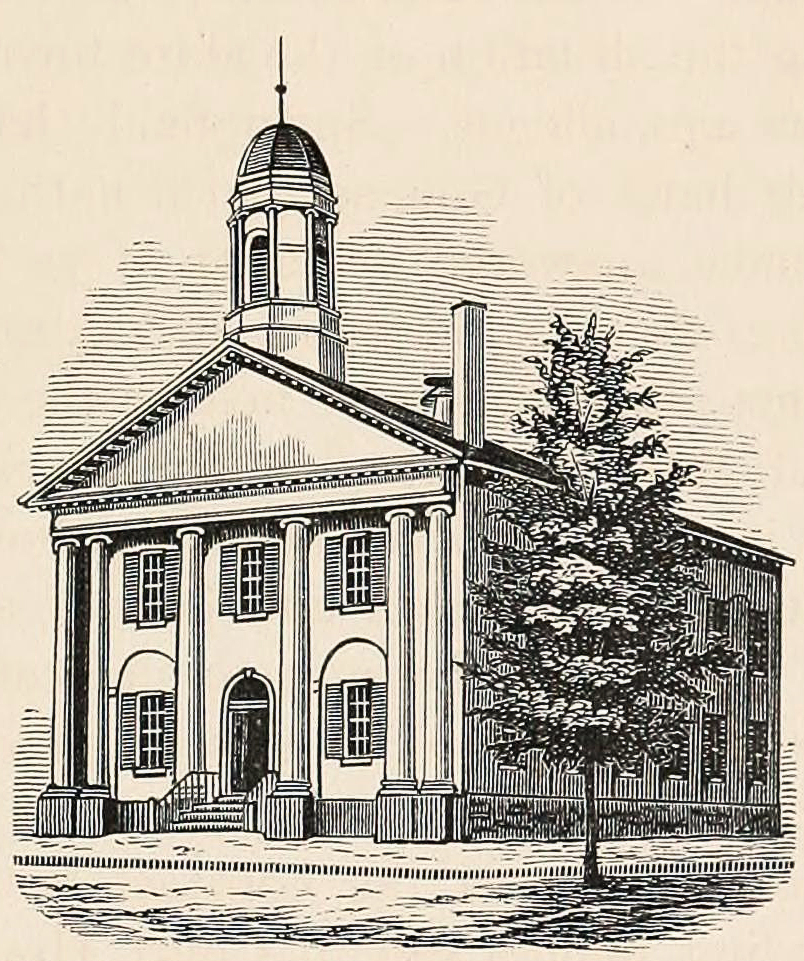
The second courthouse, built in 1821-1822, and first of Hampden County, which had been established in 1812

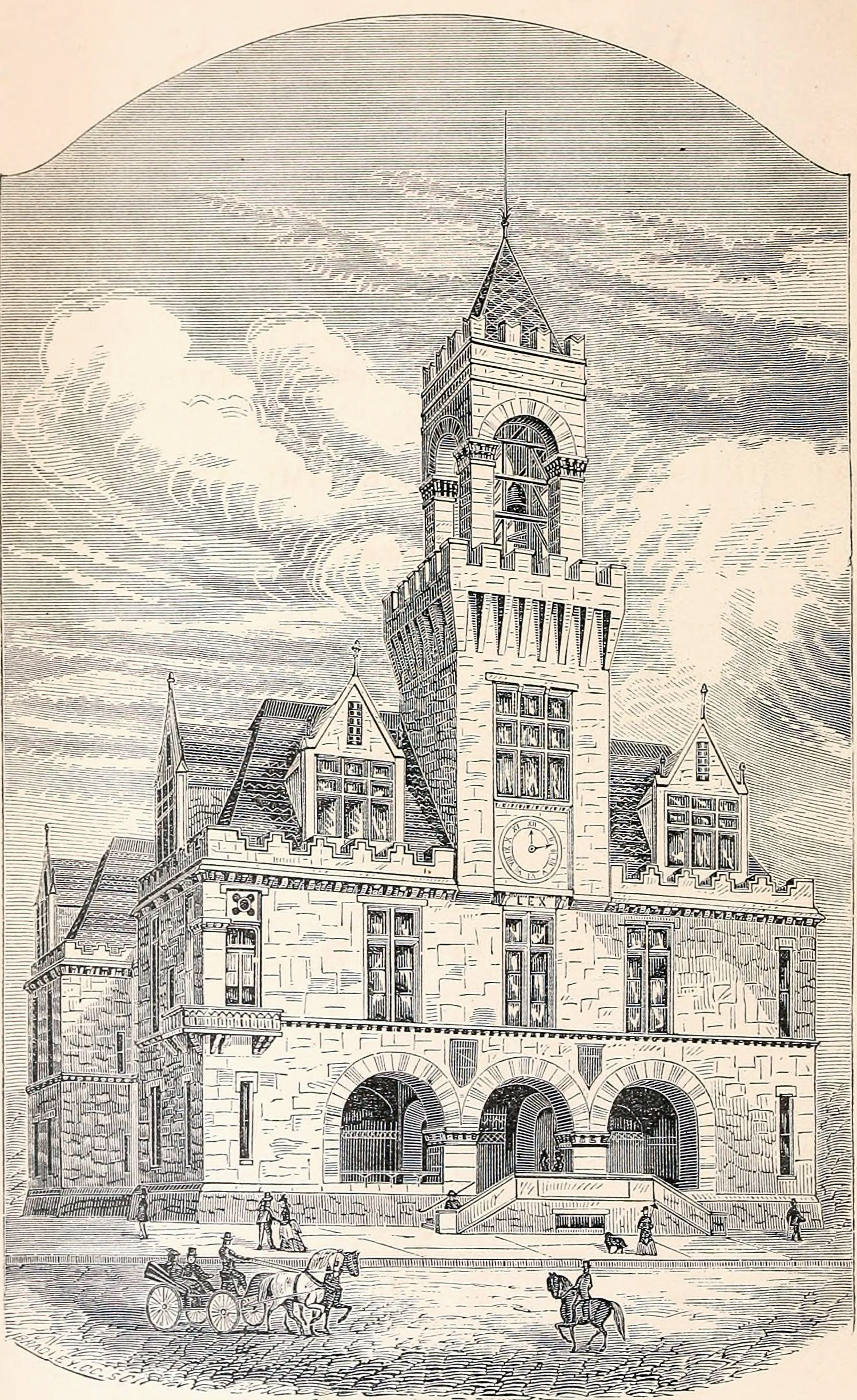
The H.H. Richardson structure as it appeared at its dedication, 1874

== See also ==
- National Register of Historic Places listings in Springfield, Massachusetts
- National Register of Historic Places listings in Hampden County, Massachusetts
