= Laverack (surname) =

Laverack is a surname. Notable people with the surname include:

- Edward Laverack (born 1994), Welsh cyclist
- Frederick Laverack (1871–1928), British social worker, campaigner, and politician
- Michael Laverack (1931–1993), British zoologist
- William Laverack Jr., American businessman
