= Restore Our Future =

Political action committee

- Legal status: Active
- Purpose: Elect Mitt Romney as President
- Website: Restore Our Future at the Wayback Machine (archived August 29, 2012)

Restore Our Future is a political action committee (PAC) created to support Mitt Romney in the 2012 U.S. Presidential election. A so-called Super PAC, Restore Our Future is permitted to raise and spend unlimited amounts of corporate, union, and individual campaign contributions under the terms of the Citizens United Supreme Court decision.

Restore Our Future was founded by Romney aides in 2010. Charles Spies, the group's treasurer and former general counsel for Romney's 2008 campaign for the Republican presidential nomination, described Restore Our Future as "an independent effort focused on getting Romney elected president." The group reported raising over $12 million in the first half of 2011, in the form of large donations from approximately 90 wealthy individuals and corporations. As of July 2012, Restore Our Future had raised more than $60 million, nearly half from Wall Street contributors. Spies declined to discuss specific contributors to the PAC.

== Contributors ==
As of July 2012, Restore Our Future had raised more than $60 million, a large portion of which came from Wall Street contributors.

As of August 2011, the largest individual contributor to Restore Our Future was John Paulson, a billionaire and hedge fund manager who is, according to Politico, "famous for [having enriched] himself by betting on the collapse of the housing industry." An additional million dollars came from W Spann LLC, a dummy corporation with no record of actual business activities. W Spann LLC was incorporated, donated to the PAC, and then dissolved in a matter of months, attracting concern from election-watchdog groups and campaign-finance experts about the use of dummy corporations to shield large campaign contributions from public scrutiny.

Several watchdog groups requested that the Justice Department and Federal Election Commission investigate donations to Restore Our Future from W Spann LLC as possible violations of campaign-finance law. Restore Our Future declined to provide additional details about the donation and asserted that it had complied with existing laws.

In response to rumors, a spokesman for Bain Capital, a private equity firm previously headed by Romney, stated that W Spann LLC "is not affiliated with Bain Capital or any of our employees." Shortly thereafter, Edward Conard, a former top executive at Bain Capital who retired in 2007, came forward to state that he had formed W Spann LLC and funded and authorized the $1 million contribution. Conard requested that Restore Our Future amend its filings to reflect that he, rather than W Spann LLC, had donated the $1 million.

Another entity, Paumanok Partners LLC, contributed $250,000 to Restore Our Future. It has been traced back to Romney donor William Laverack, Jr. Glenbrook L.L.C. was originally reported as donating $250,000 in August 2011, but in an amended filing with the FEC the Glenbrook donation was replaced by two $125,000 donations by Jesse Rogers, a former executive at Bain & Company.

Two additional $1 million contributions came from corporations registered to the offices of two executives of Nu Skin Enterprises, a Utah-based multilevel marketing company selling skin-care products and dietary supplements. Other large contributors included members of the Marriott family, hedge-fund managers, and investors in Bain Capital.

Several Affiliates of Melaleuca, Inc., an Idaho-based multilevel marketing company owned by Frank L. VanderSloot, have donated a total of approx. $1 million to the PAC. VanderSloot is also a national finance co-chairman of the Romney campaign.

=== From federal contractors ===
Despite a 36-year-old ban against federal contractors making federal political expenditures, Restore Our Future has accepted donations of $890,000 from at least five such companies, who are taking advantage of a legal gray area created by the U.S. Supreme Court's 2010 ruling in Citizens United v. FEC. Oxbow Carbon, a major coal and petroleum company founded by William Koch that contracts with the Tennessee Valley Authority, gave $750,000, and has insisted such donations are now legal. Another company, M.C. Dean, a Virginia-based electrical engineering company, donated $5,000, but has asked the funds to be returned after consulting with lawyers. The other companies are: B/E Aerospace, a U.S. Department of Defense contractor, which gave $50,000; Clinical Medical Services, which contracts with the Department of Veterans Affairs, donated $25,000; and Suffolk Construction Co., which is building a U.S. Naval base, donated $60,000.

== Iowa ad ==
In December 2011, Glenn Kessler of the Washington Post found that a Restore ad attacking Newt Gingrich in Iowa had a number of "egregious fouls" and "underhanded" treatment of Freddie Mac and abortion issues. The PAC had $3 million budgeted for the Iowa television campaign. Brittany Gross, a Restore spokesperson, declined to answer questions from Kessler about the ad.

== Board and staffing ==
Restore’s board of directors included treasurer Spies; Carl Forti, political director for Governor Romney’s 2008 campaign and of American Crossroads Super PAC; and Larry McCarthy, a member of Governor Romney's media team in 2008.

Don Stirling, who was the 2002 Utah Olympics' local marketing chief and fundraiser working with Romney, worked with Restore Our Future during Governor Romney's 2012 presidential campaign.
