= W Spann =

Phantom company that donated to Mitt Romney's campaign

W Spann LLC was a phantom company created at the behest of an originally unknown person by Boston lawyer Cameron Casey on March 15, 2011, apparently for the sole purpose of anonymously donating one million dollars to Restore Our Future, a Super PAC supporting U.S. presidential candidate Mitt Romney. After donating the money on April 28, the company was dissolved on July 12.

Its given address in Midtown Manhattan at 590 Madison Avenue, a 41-story tower, had no record of its tenancy. The address is shared by Bain Capital, of which Romney was once chief executive officer, among other companies. Alex Stanton, a spokesman for Bain Capital, denied any affiliation between the two companies.

Romney's campaign did not comment on the donation. Tim Larimer, a spokesperson for Ropes & Gray, the law firm which employs Casey and represents Bain Capital, said the firm couldn't discuss the matter. After NBC discovered the phantom company in August 2011, Democracy 21 and Campaign Legal Center, two groups that promote greater transparency in election laws, asked the U.S. Justice Department to investigate whether campaign disclosure laws were broken. Charles Spies, the treasurer of Restore Our Future, said that the pro-Romney committee had "fully complied with all FEC regulations, including publicly disclosing donors on our July 31 report."

Ed Conard came forward as the person behind the company on August 5. Conard was a top official at Bain Capital before retiring in 2007, but still maintained an office at its Manhattan street address. It was unclear why he tried to donate via an anonymous route, as he had publicly donated to Romney's campaigns and PACs in the past, and in a 2007 media appearance he was described as a major supporter. Restore Our Future spokesperson Brittany Gross stated: "We're glad Mr. Conard has chosen to come forward putting an end to this supposed controversy. Restore our Future will amend our report per Mr. Conard's request to reflect him as the donor."

However, Democracy 21 and the Campaign Legal Center still wanted an investigation due to lingering questions.
