= Jill Davis =

American author and television writer (born 1966)

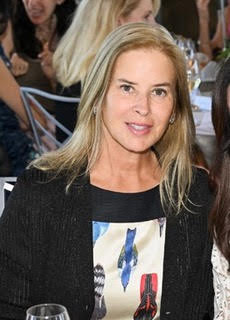
- Born: 1966 (age 59–60); Reading, Pennsylvania
- Education: attended Endicott College: 1988 Emerson College
- Employer(s): 1991–1997, writer for David Letterman's programs on NBC and CBS
- Spouse: Edward Conard m. May 13, 2000
- Children: daughter
- Website: jilldavis.com

Jill A. Davis (born 1966) is an American author and television writer. She is a member of the Writers Guild of America. She was nominated for five Emmy awards for her six years of work as a writer for David Letterman. Her first novel, Girls' Poker Night (published by Random House in 2002), was a New York Times bestseller. It was published in five languages, and twelve countries. Her second novel, Ask Again Later, was published by Ecco in February 2007 and was a New York Times bestseller.

== Biography ==
Davis, originally from Berks County, Pennsylvania, is a graduate of Endicott College and Emerson College, majoring in creative writing. She holds an MFA in Fiction from NYU and has an honorary Ph.D. in Arts & Letters from Endicott.

Prior to working in television, Davis was a newspaper reporter and columnist. After leaving the Late Show with David Letterman, she created and executive-produced a television show pilot for DreamWorks starring Tracy Pollan, Anna Says. She also wrote and published a number of screenplays, teleplays, short stories and magazine articles.

She is married to Edward Conard and lives in New York City with her husband and daughter.

== Works ==
=== Novels ===
Davis, Jill A. (2007). Ask again later (1st ed.). New York: Ecco. ISBN 978-0060875961. LCCN 2006048613.
Davis, Jill A. (2002). Girls' poker night : a novel (1st ed.). New York: Random House. ISBN 0375505148. LCCN 2001048227.

=== Collections/humor ===
- 1996 David Letterman’s New Book of Top Ten Lists and Wedding Dress Patterns for the Husky Bride by David Letterman, Steve O'Donnell, et al. ISBN 0-553-10243-5
- 1995 David Letterman’s Book of Top Ten Lists and Zest Lo-Cal Chicken Recipesby David Letterman, Steve O'Donnell, et al. ISBN 0-553-10222-2
- 1996 Home Cookin’ with Dave’s Momby David Letterman, foreword by David Letterman and Jill Davis. ISBN 0-671-00060-8

=== Short stories ===
- 2004 "New York" (in Girls' Night In, ed. Lauren Henderson, Chris Manby, Sarah Mlynowski, ISBN 0-373-25074-6)
- 2004 "Sister Goddess Ruby" (in May Contain Nuts: A Very Loose Canon of American Humor, ed. Michael J. Rosen, ISBN 0-06-051626-7)

=== Television and film ===
- 2000 Drinking, Smoking, Fooling Around, a collection of short stories adapted as monologues (HBO Productions) (writer)
- 1999 Mother's Helper, teleplay (Blue Relief, Inc.; Bob Kosberg Productions & Touchstone Pictures) (writer)
- 1999 Anna Says, sitcom pilot (DreamWorks Television and Lottery Hill Entertainment) (creator, writer, executive producer)
- 1998 The Group, sitcom (Blue Relief, Inc.) (creator, writer, executive producer)
- 1996 The Late Show with David Letterman: Video Special II (CBS) (writer)
- 1995 The Late Show with David Letterman: Video Special (CBS) (writer)
- 1993-1996 The Late Show with David Letterman (CBS) (writer)
- 1992 The Late Show with David Letterman: Tenth Anniversary Special (NBC) (writer)
- 1991-1993 Late Night with David Letterman (NBC) (writer)
- Half Magic, film (Nickelodeon Films) (writer)

=== Articles ===
- Davis, Jill A. (November 30, 2002). "10 Things You Don't Know About Women". Esquire. Archived from the original on June 11, 2011.
- "The Reason You're Still Single: Commitmentphobia Isn't Just a Guy Thing" (Cosmopolitan, Sept. 1 2002)
- The Countdown (serialized novella later developed as Ask Again Later, USA Today Open Book, 2008)
- "The North Shore's Literary Treasure, John Updike" (North Shore Life, August–September 1987, Vol VII, No. 4)

== Fellowship ==
The Jill Davis Fellowship is a literary fellowship awarded to an incoming student in the MFA program at New York University's Creative Writing Program.
