= S. F. Cushman Woolen Mill =

Coordinates: 42.0995°N 72.3109°W

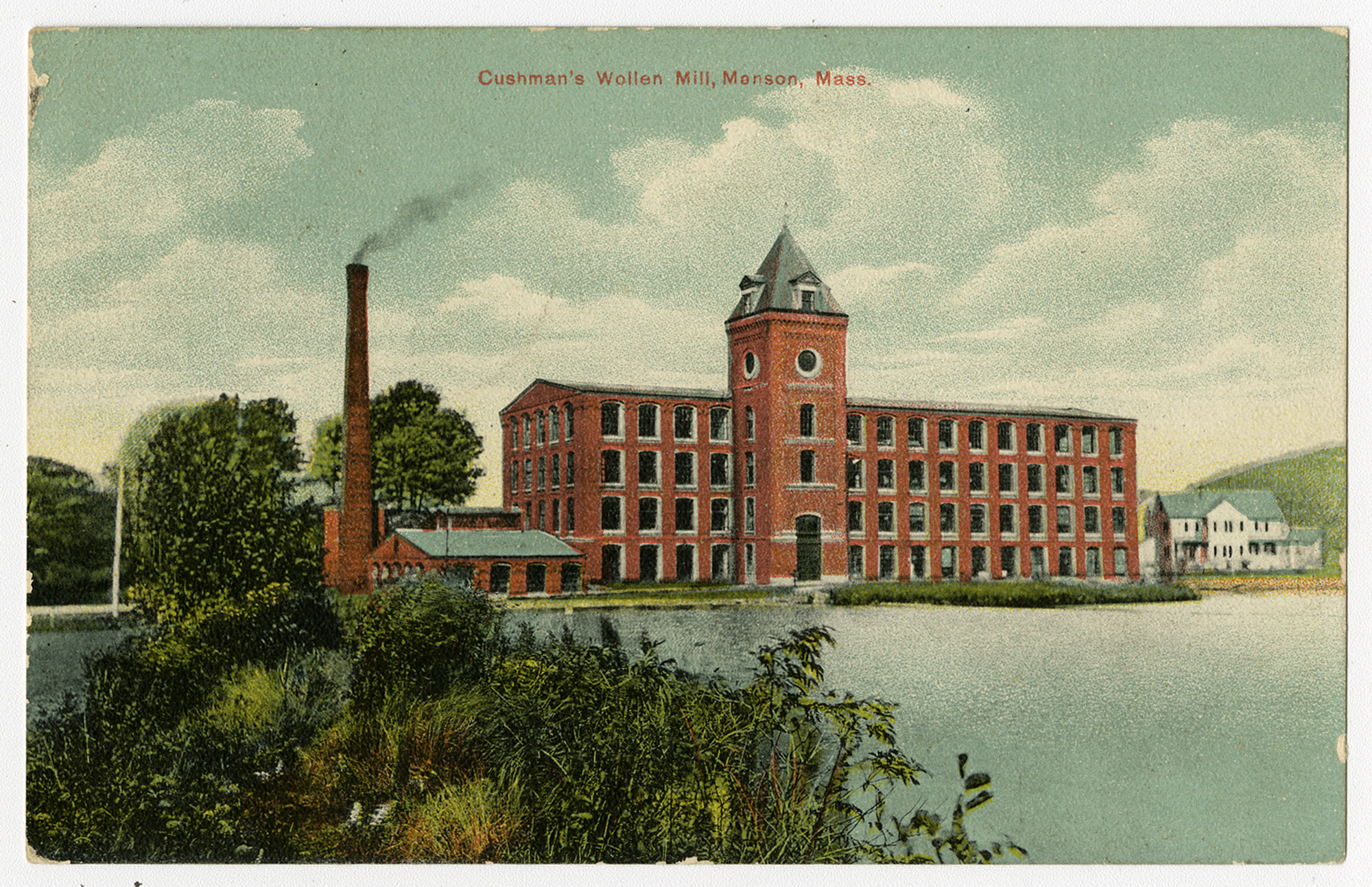
S.F. Cushman Woolen Mill in 1910

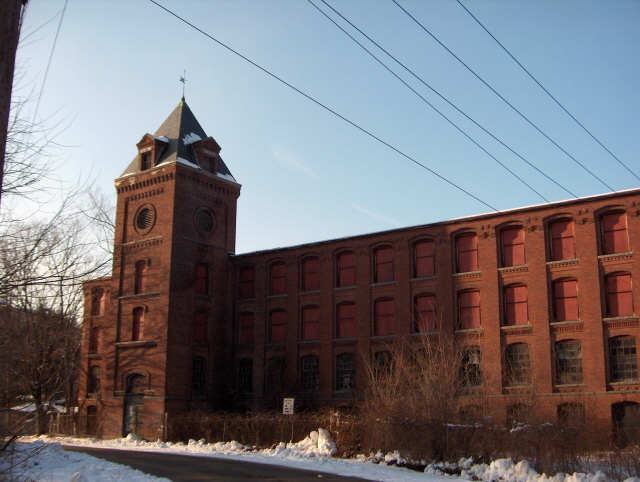
S.F. Cushman Woolen Mill as seen today in its state of abandonment.

The S.F. Cushman Woolen Mill is a former textile mill in Monson, Massachusetts.

== History ==
The mill was originally built in the early 1800s, making it one of the first wool carding facilities built in the United States. The property was bought and sold several times until S.F. Cushman bought it in 1877. The building has burned down twice; it was most recently rebuilt, out of brick, in 1886.

At various times in its history, the mill produced broadcloth, satinet, cashmere, doeskin, kersey and cloaking. The mill was used to spin and card wool until 1906, when the owners turned to buying yarn instead.

In 1912 the factory was sold to the Heimann and Lichten Company, who had just been burned out of their Main Street facility. They sold the factory in 1927 to Ellis, who used the building as a storehouse. It is the last surviving hat factory in Monson and one of the last major mills still in existence in Monson, although it has been abandoned for quite some time.

== See also ==
- Omega Metal Processing
