= George O. Bierkoe =

Co-founder of Endicott College

Dr. George Olav Bierkoe (July 2, 1895 – April 11, 1979) was co-founder, along with his wife, Eleanor E. Tupper (1904–1999), of Endicott College in Beverly, Massachusetts. Bierkoe served as first president of the college from the founding in 1939 until 1971. Founded as a junior college for women, the school is now a co-educational four-year college twenty miles north of Boston. Endicott is known for its emphasis on internships beginning in a student's first year.

Bierkoe graduated from Muhlenberg College in 1922 and became a Lutheran minister in 1925. He was the pastor of a congregation in the Bellaire neighborhood of Queens, New York. He received an honorary Doctor of Letters degree from the University of Cincinnati in 1971.

Bierkoe Hall on the Endicott campus is named for Bierkoe and Phi Theta Kappa national honor society for junior colleges awards the George O. Bierkoe Distinguished Member Award to up to 25 students annually.
