= Monson High School =

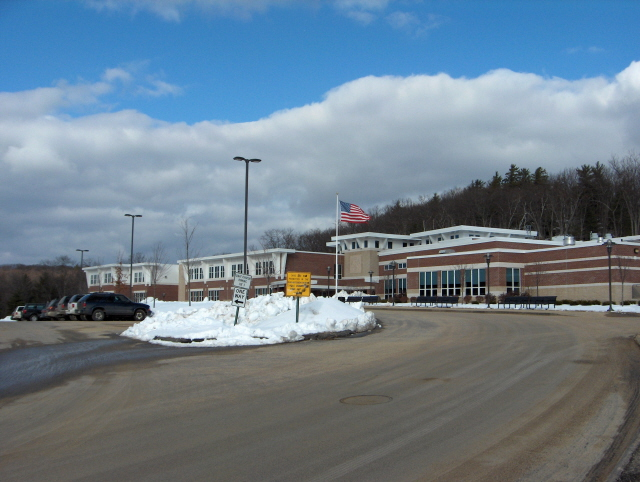
- Monson High School in January 2006

Location
- 55 Margaret Street; Monson, Massachusetts 01057; United States; 42°06′45″N 72°19′02″W

Information
- Type: Regular High School
- School district: Monson Public Schools
- NCES District ID: 2508040
- NCES School ID: 250804001269
- Faculty: 24.8
- Teaching staff: 35.02 (FTE)
- Grades: 7–12
- Enrollment: 295 (2023–2024)
- Student to teacher ratio: 8.42
- Colors: Blue and white
- Team name: Mustangs
- Website: https://www.monsonschools.com/mhs

Monson High School is a school located in The Monson Public School school district in Monson, Massachusetts, United States. The school's construction started in 2000 and was finished in 2002. The Monson High School replaced the old Junior Senior High School which has now become Granite Valley Middle school. This is Monson's only high school and houses grades 7–12.

The Monson High School mascot is the Mustangs, and the school colors are blue and white.

== See also ==
- Palmer High School (Massachusetts)
