= First Church of Monson =

Church in Monson, Massachusetts, US

Coordinates: 42°06′09.42″N 72°19′10.43″W

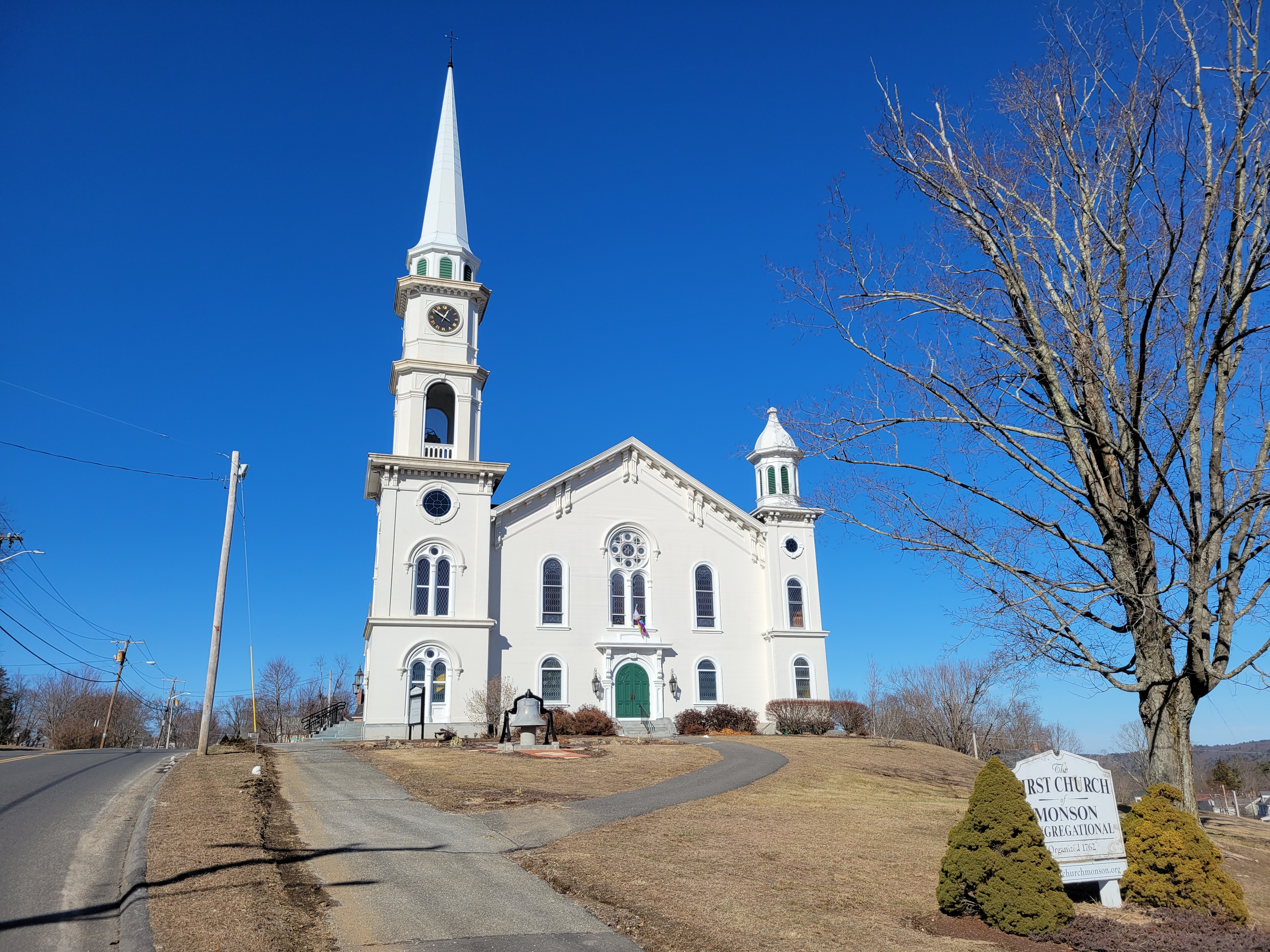
First Church of Monson Congregational

The Congregational Church, or the First Church of Monson is a historic church located in Monson, Massachusetts that is currently affiliated with the United Church of Christ.

== History ==
The church was first established in 1762. A second meeting house was built in 1803, and was replaced by the current structure in 1873. The older building apparently survived beyond its days as a church and was then used as an A&P store. The Reverend Jesse Ives was minister from 1773-1805. The church is currently affiliated with the United Church of Christ. It is home to an organ which is a sought-after instrument for many recitals.

== 2011 Tornado ==
On June 1, 2011, an EF3 tornado severely damaged the church, toppling the steeple, and damaging buildings and trees in the adjacent area.

== See also ==
- Congregational Church
