= Endicott College =

Private liberal arts college in Beverly, Massachusetts, US

- Seal of Endicott College
- Former name: Endicott Junior College (1939–1975)
- Type: Private college
- Established: 1939; 87 years ago
- Endowment: $163.5 million (2025)
- President: Bryan D. Cain (interim)
- Students: 4,575 (fall 2024)
- Undergraduates: 3,360 (fall 2024)
- Postgraduates: 1,215 (fall 2024)
- Location: Beverly, Massachusetts, U.S. 42°33′7.1″N 70°50′33.5″W
- Campus: Suburban, 235 acres (95 ha)
- Colors: (Blue, green, and white)
- Nickname: Gulls
- Sporting affiliations: NCAA - Division III (CNE)
- Website: endicott.edu
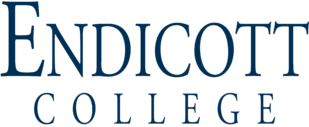

Endicott College is a private college in Beverly, Massachusetts. It was founded in 1939 as a two-year women's college. It began offering four-year degrees in 1988 and became coeducational in 1994.

Endicott enrolled approximately 4,300 students as of the fall 2020 semester. It offers associate, bachelor's, master's, and doctoral programs, as well as graduate-level certificates, with a curriculum emphasizing an applied learning component with required internships.

The college has a 235-acre (95 ha) seaside campus. Its athletics teams compete as the Gulls in the Conference of New England in Division III.

== History ==
Endicott College was founded as Endicott Junior College in 1939 by Eleanor Tupper and her husband, George O. Bierkoe. Originally a two-year women's college, its mission was educating women for greater independence and an enhanced position in the workplace. The school was named for John Endicott, the first governor of the Massachusetts Bay Colony. It was issued its first charter by the Commonwealth of Massachusetts that same year. It graduated its first class, 20 students, in 1941. In 1944, the school was approved by the state for the granting of associate degrees, and in 1952, Endicott was accredited by the New England Association of Schools and Colleges. In 1975, the college dropped the "Junior" from its name, becoming just Endicott College. In 1994, Endicott became co-educational.

George Bierkoe served as Endicott's first president from its opening until 1971. Eleanor Tupper then served as president until 1980. She subsequently wrote Endicott and I, published in 1985, which details the founding and history of the college. Carol Hawkes became the third president of Endicott College in 1980, and during her tenure the college transitioned from a two-year to a four-year institution. Francis Gamelin served as Endicott's fourth president as the college searched for Hawkes' successor. In 1988, Richard E. Wylie became Endicott's fifth president. Wylie's 30-year tenure was marked by major growth; the college built more than 20 new buildings and expanded its footprint to 235 acres of land alongside Beverly's scenic coast. In 2018, Kathleen Hildreth Barnes stepped in as interim president while Endicott's board engaged in a search for the college's next president. On March 27, 2019, Endicott announced that Steven R. DiSalvo would become its seventh president. DiSalvo was inaugurated on September 27, 2019, and stepped down from his post on October 20, 2025, due to health issues. Prior to DiSalvo stepping down, Bryan Cain was named Acting President on March 24, 2025, and Interim President following DiSalvo's departure. On March 2, 2026, after a comprehensive process, Cain was appointed Endicott College's eighth president.

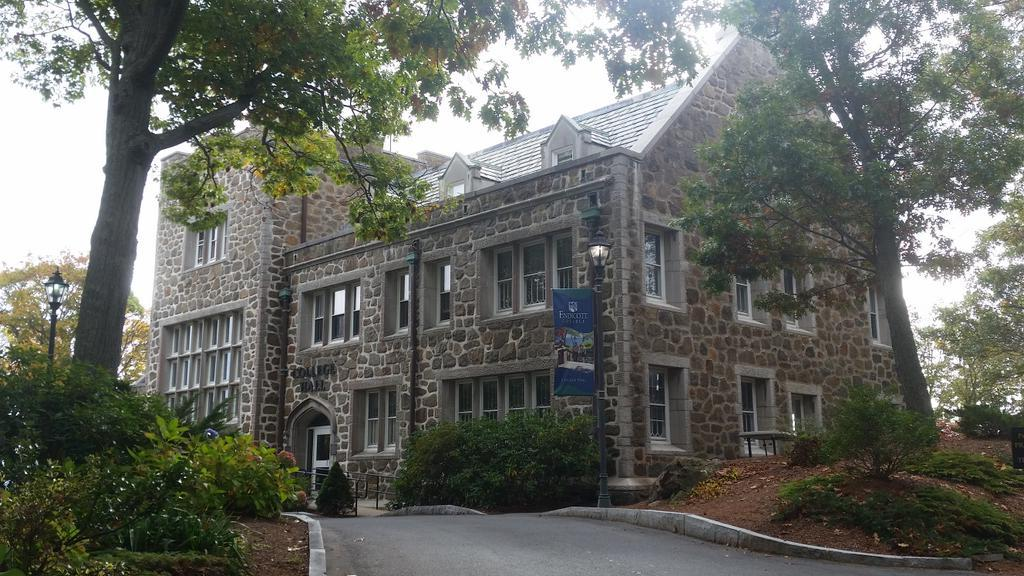
College Hall

Endicott's campus includes many historic buildings. On June 6, 1939, Endicott College purchased its first building, an estate known today as Reynolds Hall, which has served as a residence hall since the college opened on September 17, 1939. In 1940, Endicott College purchased two more buildings: Alhambra and College Hall. Both structures were a part of the William Amory Gardner estates. Built in 1750 by Thomas Woodbury, Alhambra is the oldest building on Endicott's campus, and prior to its purchase, was used as a summer home by Isabella Stewart Gardner (until 1906). Since its purchase by the college, it has been used as student housing. College Hall, built in 1916, was designed as a summer home by Henry Richards and subsequently purchased by Endicott in 1940. The building currently houses multiple administrative offices, including the Office of the President.

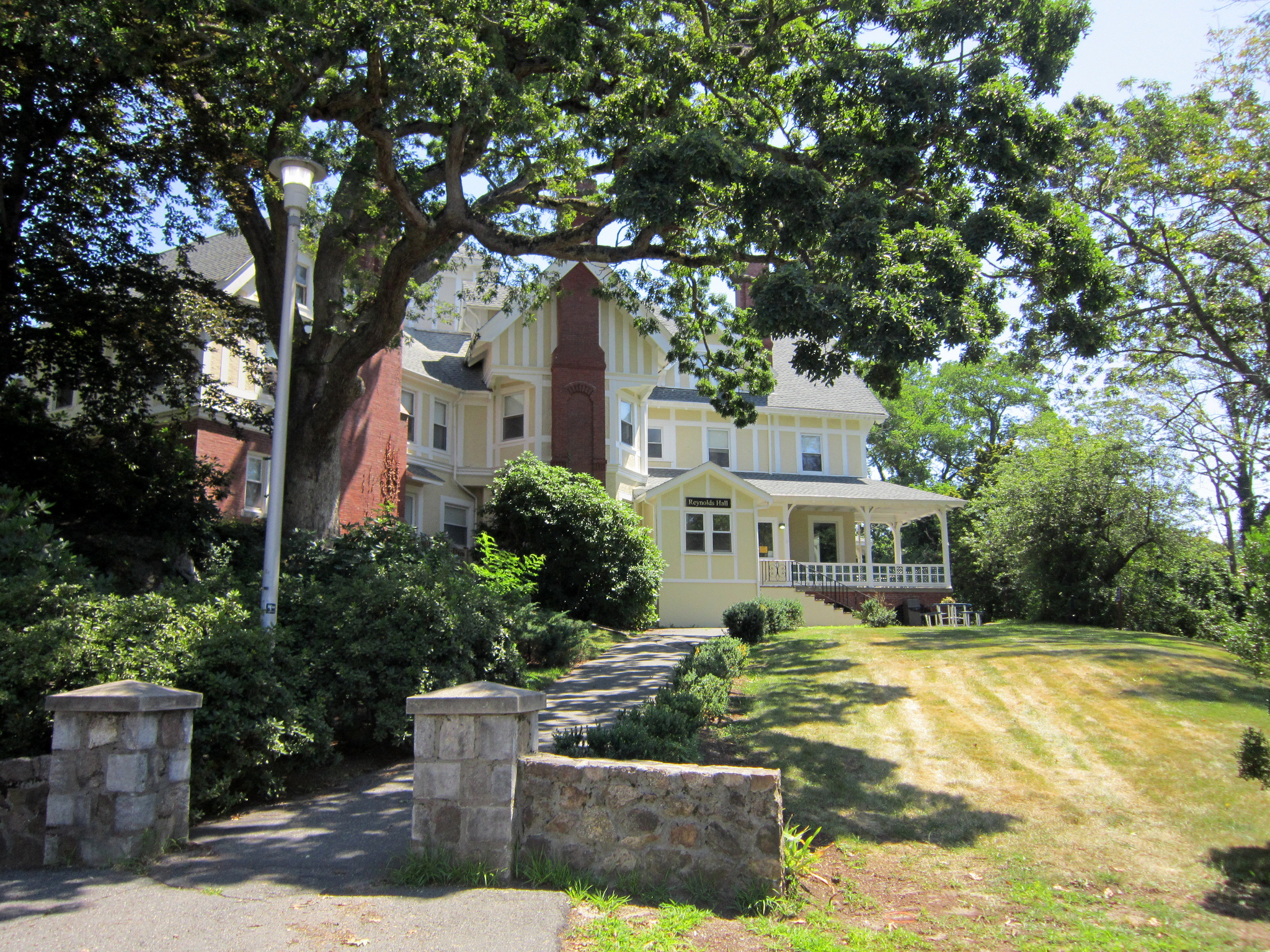
Reynolds Hall

In 1943 Endicott purchased the 1904 home of Bryce and Anna Allan, designed and built by architect Guy Lowell, and later named it Tupper Manor after the second president of the college. Today, the property is a part of the Wylie Inn and Conference Center. Winthrop Hall, built in 1845, was purchased by Endicott in 1944. In the 19th century, Winthrop's hidden stairway aided slaves en route to Canada via the Underground Railroad, and during World War II, the property was used by the United States Coast Guard as a coastline security facility. After it was purchased by the college, Winthrop became home to Endicott's first president. Today, the building is used as student housing.

In 2014, there were nearly 3,000 undergraduate students, over 2,500 students enrolled in the School of Graduate & Professional Studies, hundreds of students studying abroad, and more than 25,000 alumni worldwide.

== Campus ==
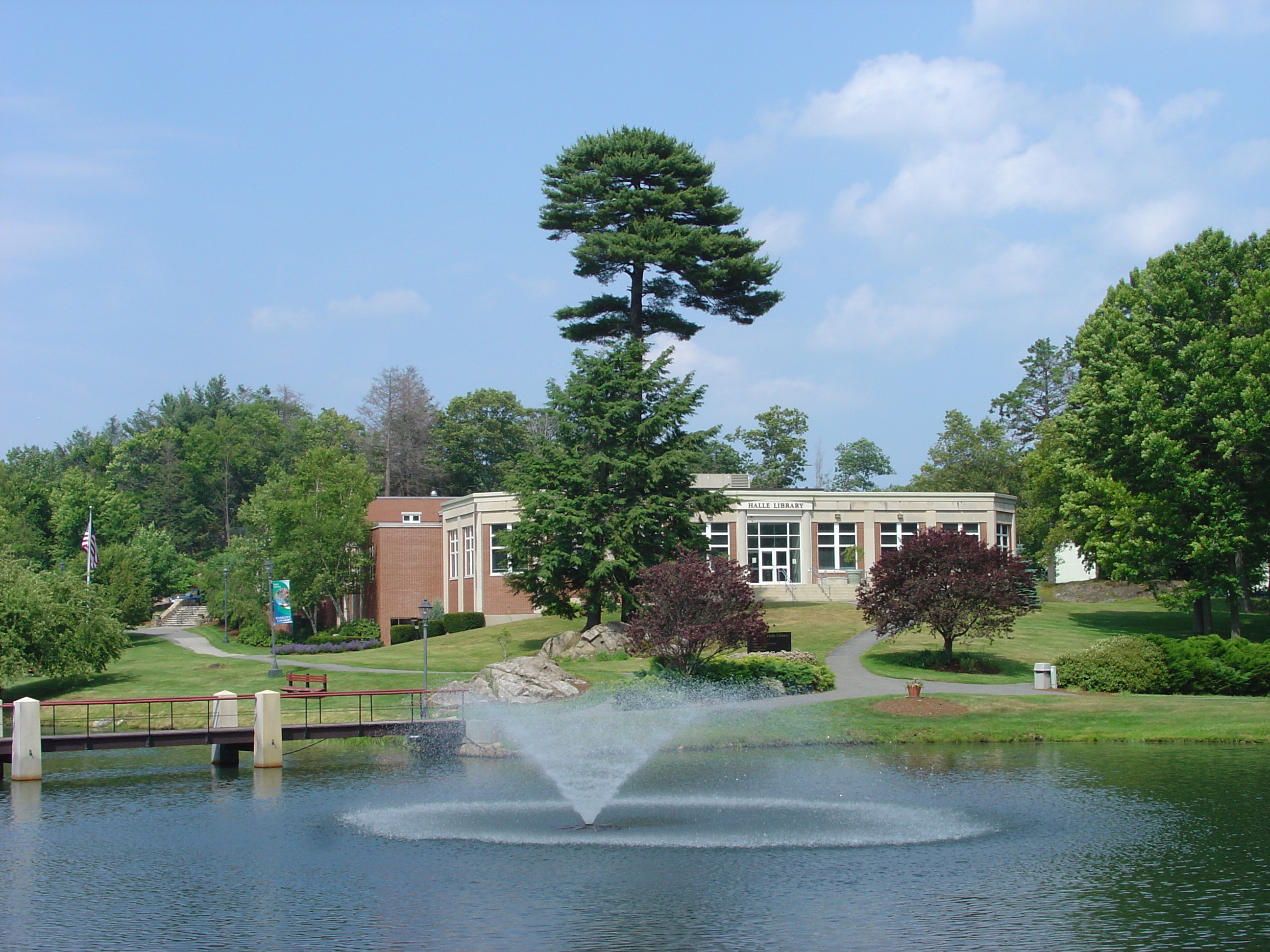
Diane M. Halle Library

The college campus is located on 235-acre (0.95 km^{2}) oceanfront property on the North Shore of Massachusetts Bay, in an area known as the Gold Coast.

Endicott's main academic buildings include the Samuel C. Wax Academic Center, Curtis L. Gerrish School of Business & Ginger Judge Science Center, Walter J. Manninen Center for the Arts, and the Cummings School for Nursing & Health Sciences. The Diane M. Halle Library serves as the main library on campus and also houses additional classrooms and student support services.

Endicott College has international sites in Spain and Ireland.

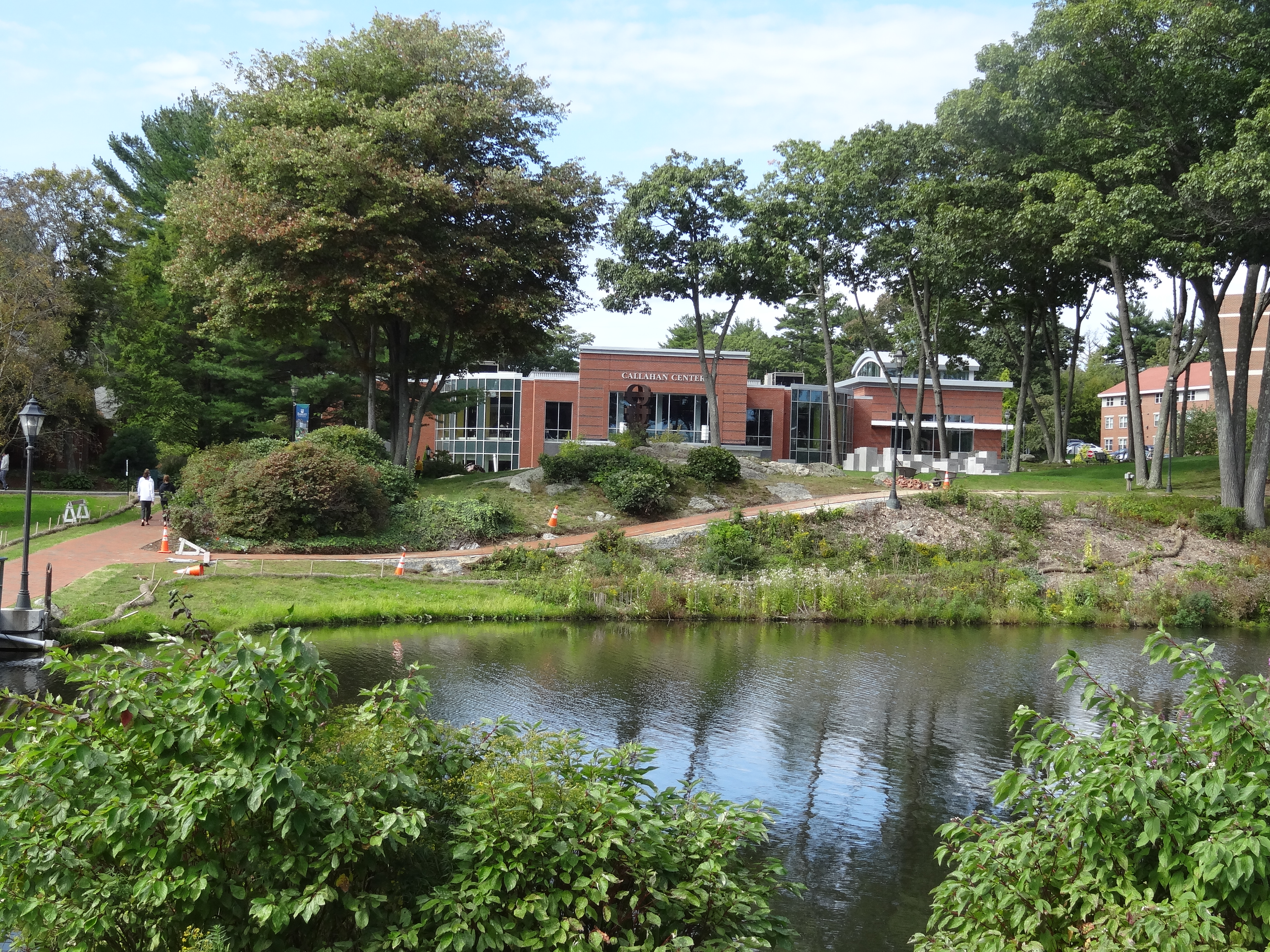
Callahan Center

The Callahan Center is the main student activities building on campus and houses the main dining hall, as well as a number of student services.

The Post Sport Science & Fitness Center was opened in 2009 and is the main center for the School of Sport Science & Fitness Studies. The building includes a gymnasium, a field house with an indoor track, workout facilities, aerobics and dance rooms, and classrooms.

The Manninen Center for the Arts opened in 2009 and houses the School of Visual and Performing Arts. The facility includes a number of spaces for performances and exhibitions, including the 250-seat Rose Theater and a 100-seat black box theater.

The Raymond J. Bourque Ice Arena houses the college's NCAA Division III men's and women's ice hockey programs, as well as serve as home to Beverly Youth Hockey, Beverly High School Hockey, and other local sports activities.

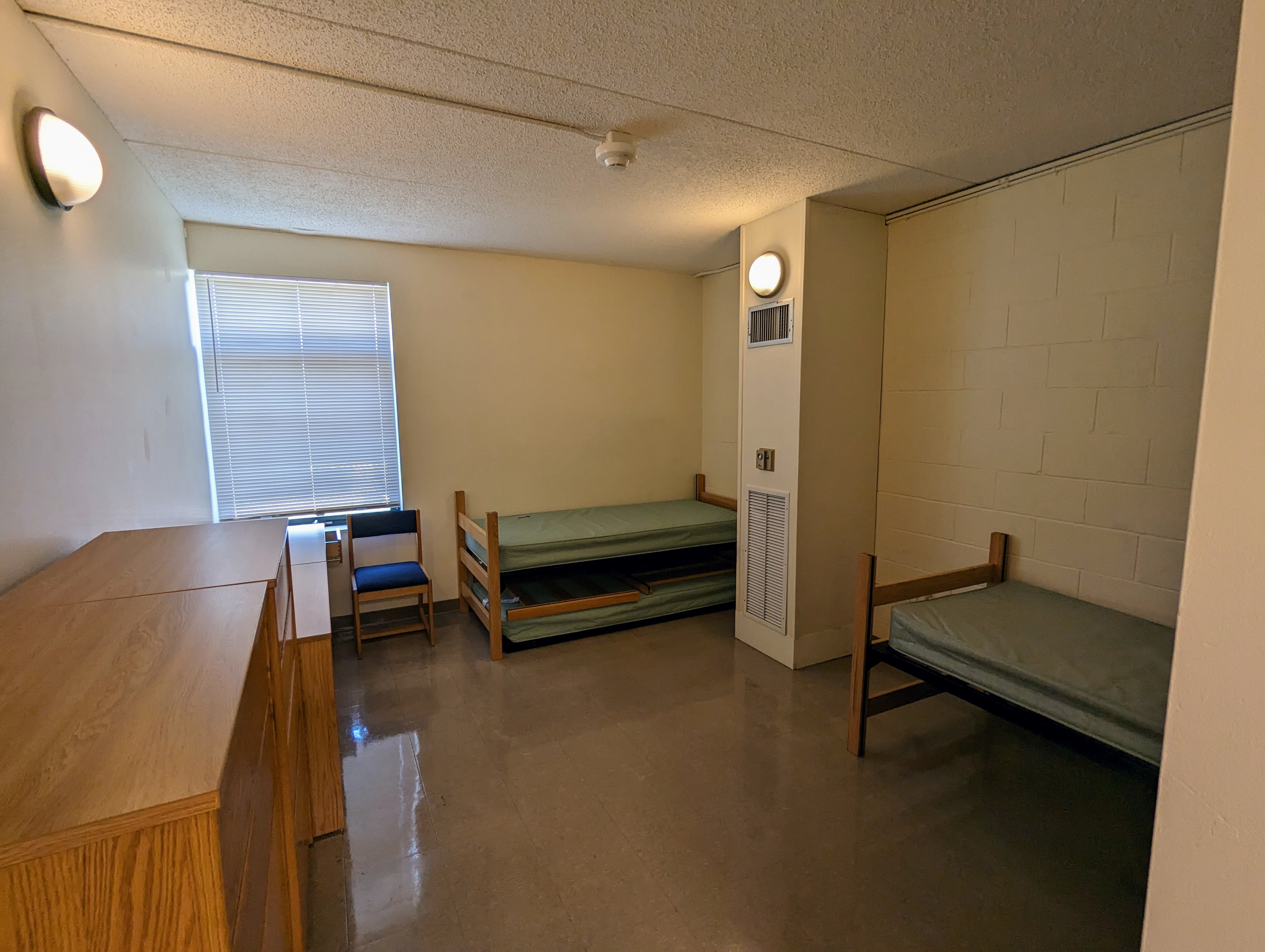
Dorm room in Stoneridge Hall

Endicott College has an academic site in Boston, 18 instructional locations throughout New England, and international sites in Czech Republic, Spain, and Switzerland.

== Academics ==
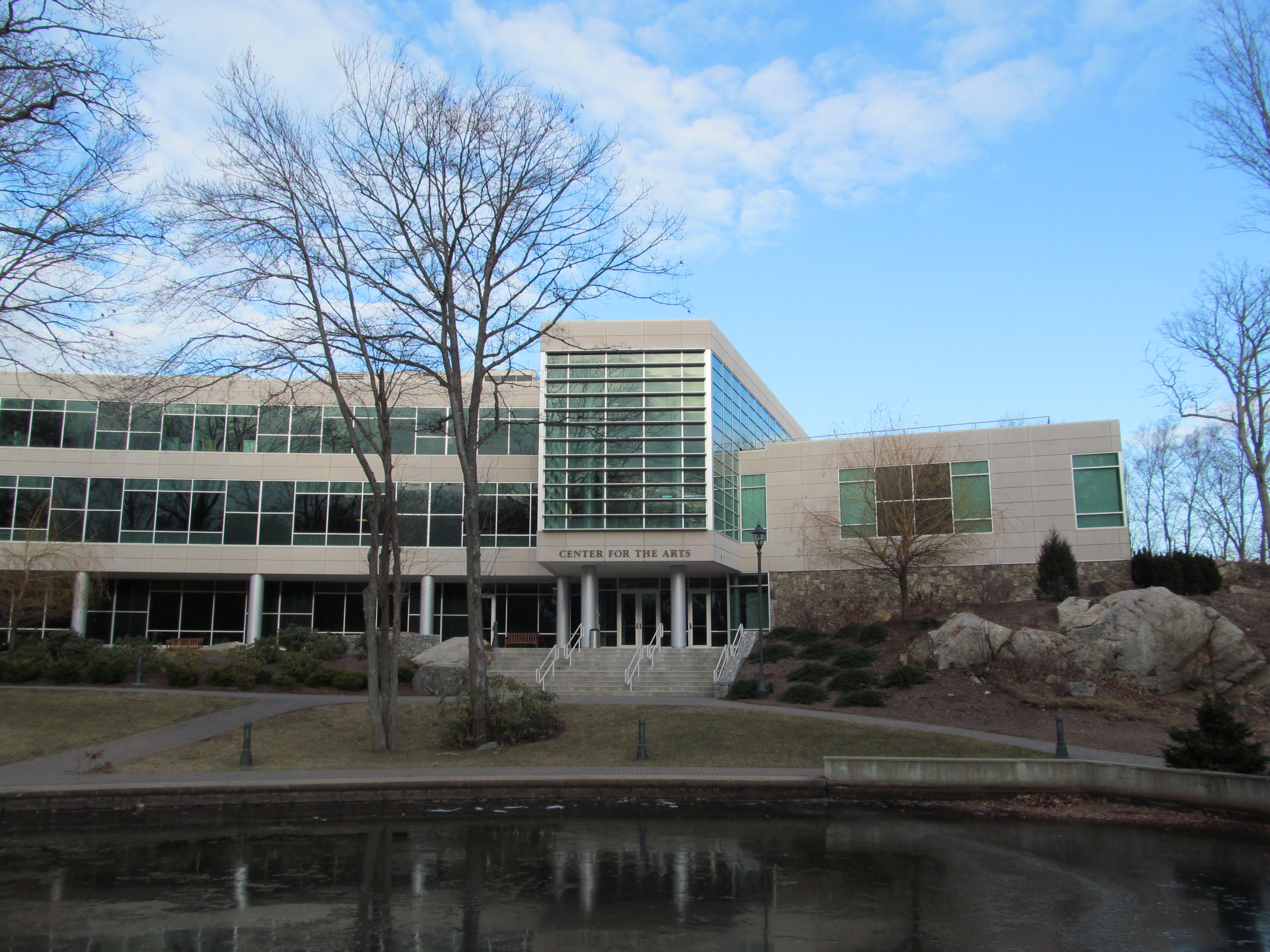
Walter J. Manninen Center for the Arts

Endicott College is composed of the School of Social Sciences, Communication, & Humanities, Gerrish School of Business, School of Education, School of Sport Science, Cummings School of Nursing & Health Sciences, School of Visual & Performing Arts, the Institute for Applied Behavioral Science, and the Van Loan Division of Professional Studies. Graduate programs are offered in Business, Education, Nursing, Bioinformatics, Applied Behavior Analysis, Interior Architecture, Homeland Security, Sport Leadership, and Athletic Training.

In 2014, the college initiated its first doctoral program (Ed.D.) in educational leadership in higher education. It now also offers an Ed.D. in preK-12 educational leadership, a Ph.D. in applied behavioral analysis, and a Ph.D. in nursing.

In 2014, Endicott's student-to-faculty ratio was 12:1.

All bachelor's degree candidates must complete three distinct internship experiences before graduation, including two 120-hour positions and a semester-long internship during their senior year. Students majoring in nursing and athletic training earn internship credits with clinical educational experiences while education majors gain experience in the classroom through student teaching.

Endicott was ranked no. 23 in the Regional Universities (North) category of U.S. News & World Report's 2019 rankings.

== Student life ==
Endicott offers over 60 student organizations, numerous academic honor societies, and varsity, club, and intramural sports. Many students also choose to participate in national community service organizations, including Habitat for Humanity, or volunteer in the local community. The student newspaper, the Endicott Observer, publishes an array of news and feature stories about the Endicott College community.

== Athletics ==
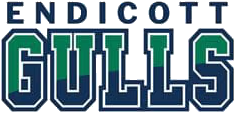
Endicott Gulls wordmark

Endicott College teams participate as a member of the NCAA Division III. The Gulls are a member of the Conference of New England. Men's sports include baseball, basketball, cross country, equestrian, football, golf, lacrosse, soccer, tennis, ice hockey and volleyball, while women's sports include basketball, cross country, equestrian, field hockey, lacrosse, soccer, softball, tennis, ice hockey and volleyball.

Endicott offers 8 men's and women's club sports: Cheerleading, Crew, Dance, Men's and Women's Rugby, and Roller Hockey.

=== Facilities ===
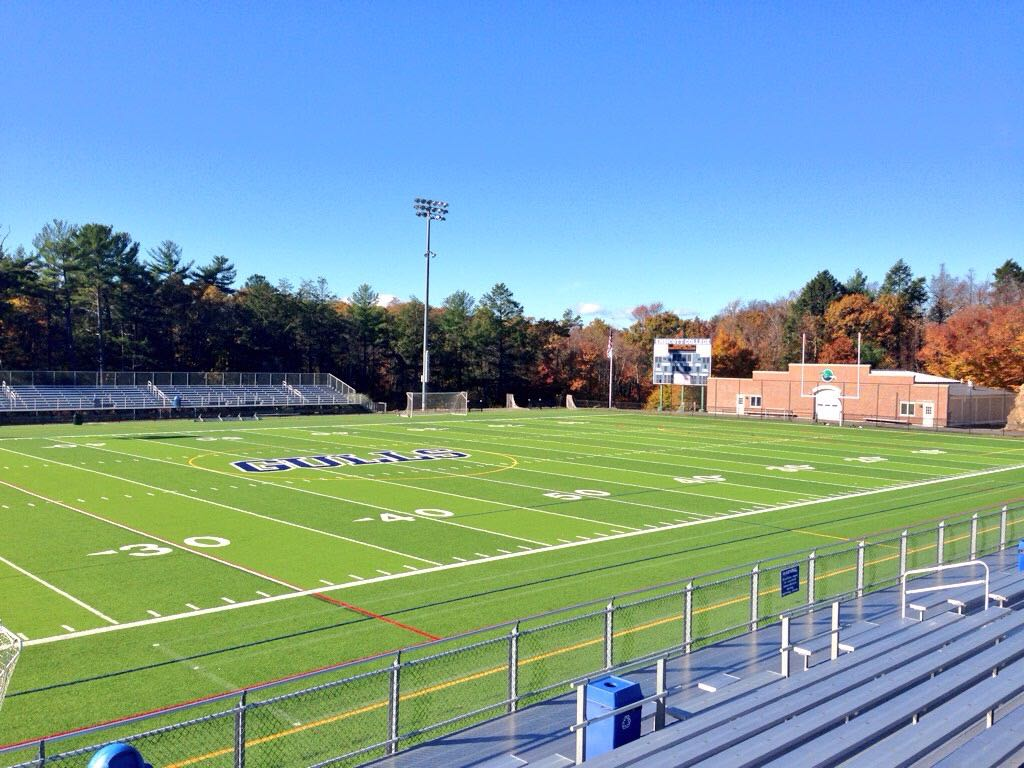
Endicott Stadium

The outdoor facilities include the Cross Country Trail, Hempstead Stadium, North Field, Softball Complex, and Tennis Courts, Winter Island. Hempstead Stadium was built in 2003, and this turf surface is home to football, men and women's lacrosse, rugby, and men and women's soccer programs here at Endicott. The Stadium was originally named Endicott Stadium, but was formally dedicated to Melissa Hempstead '69 on Saturday, October 3, 2015 on Homecoming Weekend. Endicott's baseball and field hockey teams use North Field, and all teams practice on this turf surface as well. Indoor facilities include the Post Center, MacDonald Gymnasium, and Bourque Arena. The MacDonald Gymnasium was built in 1999 and is home to both basketball and volleyball teams. The Raymond J. Bourque Arena was opened in October of 2015 and is used by both the men's and women's ice hockey teams.

== Notable alumni ==
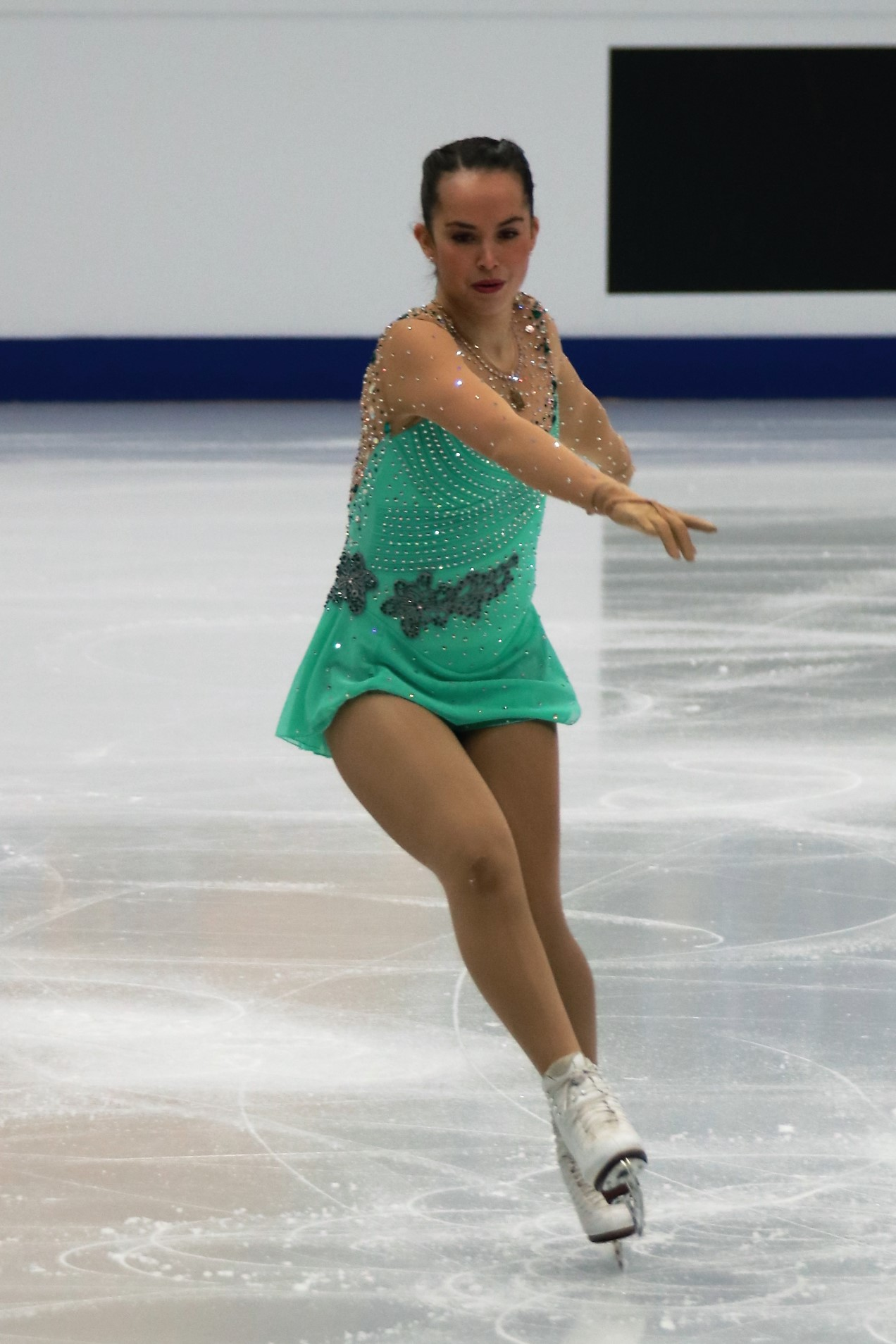
Aimee Buchanan, American-born Olympic figure skater for Israel

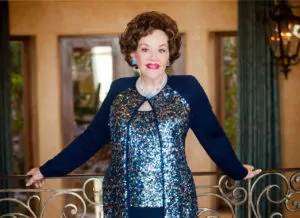
Sara O'Meara — co-founder of Childhelp, a national non-profit organization dedicated to the prevention and treatment of child abuse

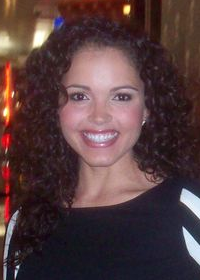
Susie Castillo — MTV personality; former Miss USA

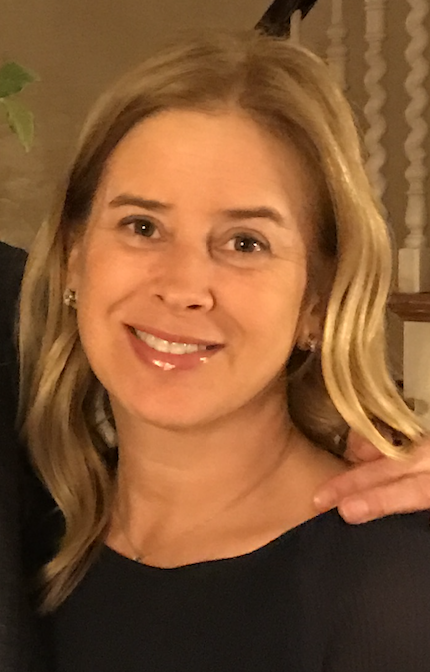
Jill Davis — television writer (for the Late Show with David Letterman), journalist, and author

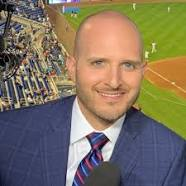
Paul Severino, sportscaster and studio host appearing across MLB Network's programming
- Noah Fearnley, actor
