= William Norcross House =

Historic house in Massachusetts, United States

- U.S. National Register of Historic Places
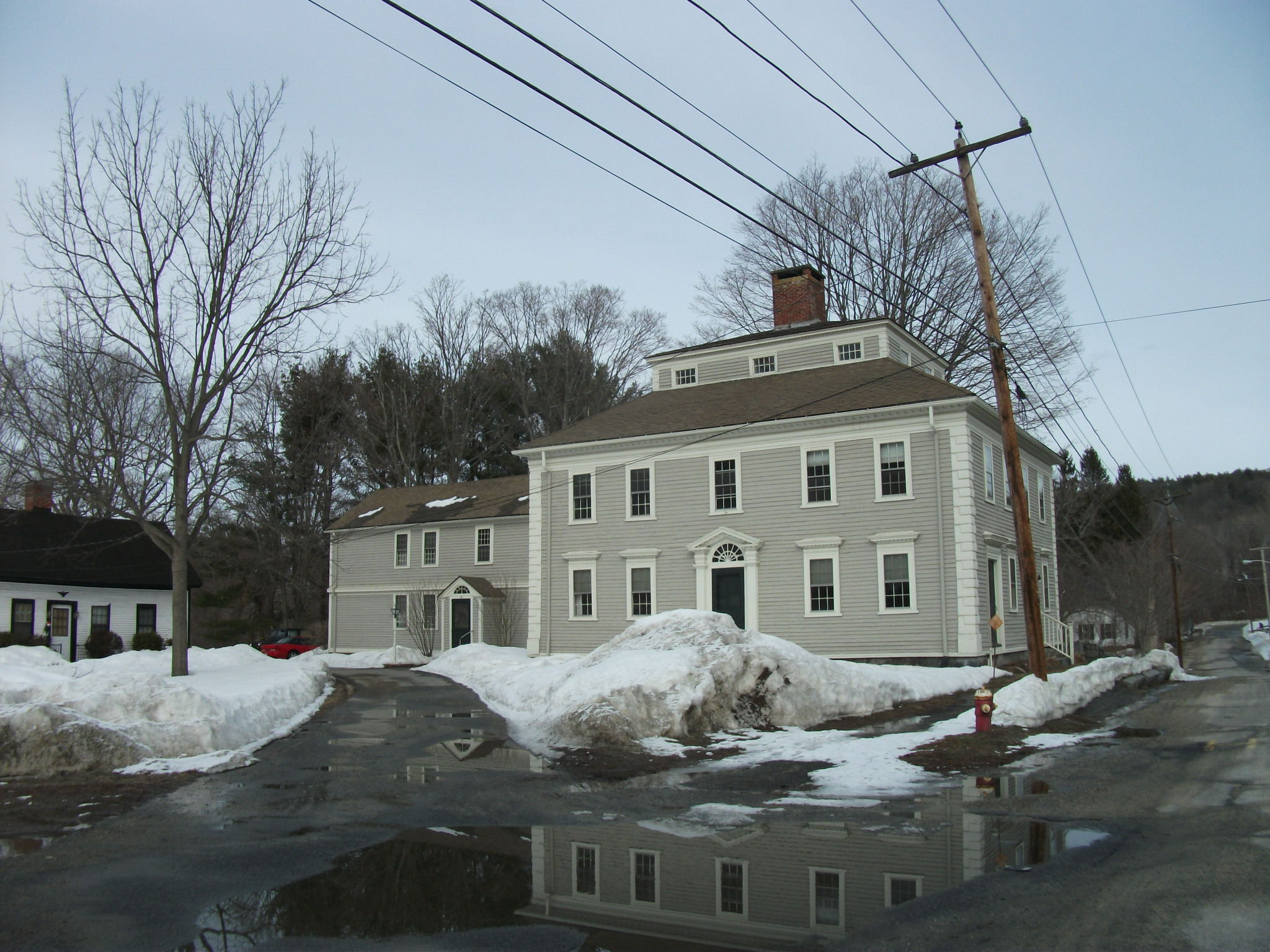

- Location within Massachusetts Location within the United States
- Location: 14 Cushman St., Monson, Massachusetts
- Coordinates: 42°5′56″N 72°18′47″W
- Area: less than one acre
- Built: 1775
- Architectural style: Georgian
- NRHP reference No.: 84002450
- Added to NRHP: March 29, 1984

The William Norcross House is a historic house at 14 Cushman Street in Monson, Massachusetts. Built about 1785, it is a good example of late Georgian architecture, whose uses as a tavern and mill worker housing exemplify trends in the town's development. It was listed on the National Register of Historic Places in 1984.

== Description and history ==
The William Norcross House is located in the village center of Monson, on the north side of Cushman Street a short way east of Main Street. It is a 2 1/2-story wood-frame structure, with a central chimney, a hip roof that has a central monitor section, and a clapboarded exterior. The building corners have wooden quoin blocks, and windows on the ground floor are topped by projecting peaked lintels. The main entrance is on the western facade, and is flanked by pilasters and topped by a half-round transom and gabled pediment. Secondary entrances added later are located on the street-facing eastern facade.

The house was constructed about 1785 by William Norcross, a cabinetmaker and joiner who had purchased the property in 1776. Norcross operated a tavern on the premises, which was a major social center in the early days of the town, and was influential in the development of the area as Monson's economic center. The Norcrosses had by the early 19th century ended its use as a tavern, and in 1835 sold it to the owners of a textile mill which had begun operations across the street in 1815. The mill broke the interior down into separate units, which it rented to mill workers. After the mill closed in 1927, the mill owners continued to operate it as a boarding house. They made only modest alterations to the exterior, principally enlarging the kitchen ell to a full two stories in height. It has since gone through a succession of owners, and remains in use as a residential rental property.

== See also ==
- National Register of Historic Places listings in Hampden County, Massachusetts
