= Laverick =

Laverick is a surname. Notable people with the surname include:

- Bill Laverick, English footballer
- Bobby Laverick (born 1938), English footballer
- Elise Laverick (born 1975), British rower
- Elizabeth Laverick (1925-2010), British engineer
- June Laverick (born 1931), English actress
- Mick Laverick (born 1954), English footballer
