= William Laverack Jr. =

American businessman

William Laverack Jr. is an American businessman who is chairman and chief executive officer of Laverack Capital Partners, a privately held investment firm and a senior advisor to Tiger Infrastructure. Laverack is a major contributor to 2012 Republican presidential nominee Mitt Romney.

== Political activities ==
Press reports indicate that in late July 2011, Laverack contributed $250,000 to Restore Our Future. a "super PAC" oriented toward Romney. The money was sent through an entity named Paumanok Partners, a company based in New Canaan, Connecticut. Laverack served as co-chair for at least two Romney fundraising events.

In April, 2011 he, his wife and daughter contributed a combined $7,500 to the Romney campaign. His family also sent $10,000 to another Romney super PAC, Free and Strong America.

== Private life ==
He is the son of William Laverack Sr. and Persis Gleason Laverack. He was the first of three children. The elder Laverack was the founding headmaster of the Applewild School. Laverack is married and has three daughters, Winslow, Mollie, and Chelsea Laverack, and a son William Laverack III.

== Career ==
He has a master of business administration from Harvard Business School and bachelor's degree, (cum laude), from Harvard College.

He served as a managing partner of J.H. Whitney and Company, and a managing director at Gleacher and Company, as well as a principal and original member of the private equity group at Morgan Stanley & Company and an officer at Morgan Guaranty Trust Company.

Paperwork at the Securities and Exchange Commission indicate Laverack is or was at the time of filing a 10% owner in a number of publicly traded firms, including; RBC Bearings, Incorporated, Herbalife, Limited, NeuroMetrix, Incorporated, KNOLOGY Incorporated and the former NMT Medical Incorporated. These filings also indicate he is a director of NeuroMetrix and KNOLOGY.

== Charitable activities ==
He served for a number of years trustee and board president of the New Canaan Country School. He is currently on the board of trustees of Choate Rosemary Hall and on the national advisory board of the Duke Engage program at Duke University. He is the head of the William And Cordelia Laverack Foundation, a private foundation that endows educational and charitable bodies.
