= Memorial Town Hall =

- U.S. National Register of Historic Places
- U.S. Historic district – Contributing property
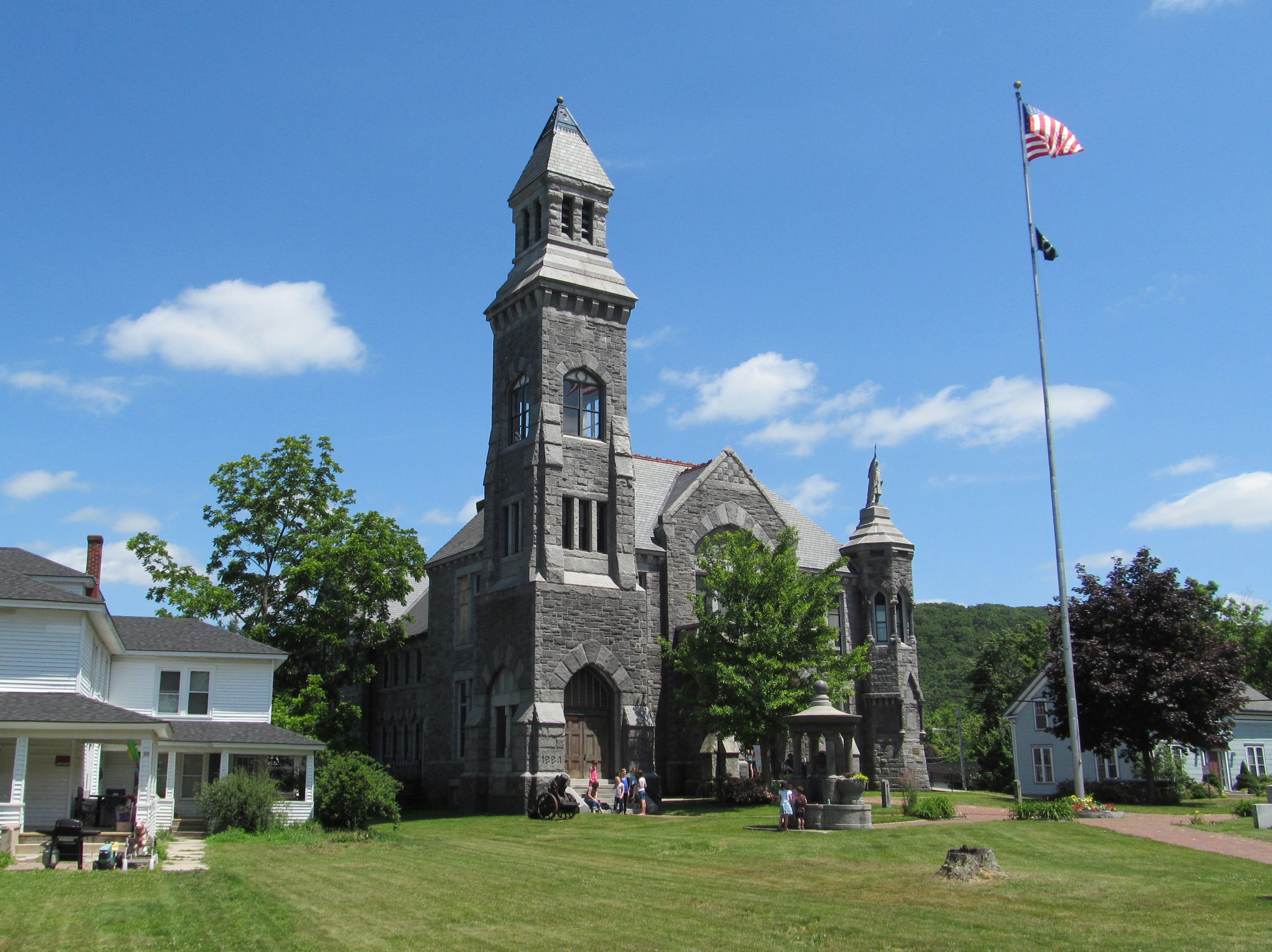
- Memorial Hall

- Location within Massachusetts Location within the United States
- Location: Monson, Massachusetts
- Coordinates: 42°5′51″N 72°18′48″W
- Built: 1885
- Architect: Potter, George E.
- Architectural style: Gothic
- Part of: Monson Center Historic District (ID90000788)
- NRHP reference No.: 84002449

Significant dates
- Added to NRHP: May 17, 1984
- Designated CP: May 6, 1991

Memorial Town Hall is the historic town hall of Monson, Massachusetts. Located on Main Street on land donated by the local prominent Reynolds family, the High Victorian Gothic stone building was constructed in 1885 to a design by George Potter. In keeping with a memorial to the town's fallen soldiers, there are two cannons (one from the American Civil War, the other from the First World War) in front of the building.

The hall, which was built of the locally quarried granite (from the same quarry that supplied granite for the Springfield Armory), the building's basic shape is that of a T. The northwest (left front) corner has a four-story tower, and the southwest (right front) corner has a smaller octagonal turret. In between, a gabled pavilion is centered on the front faced perpendicular to the main roofline. The stem of the T extends northeast to the rear of the building. Arches and other decorative elements are shaped out of ashlar granite in alternating light and dark colors. The building's roof is slate; the front portion is hipped, with the center interrupted by the front-facing gable. The rear section ends in a gable.

Inside the hall, the front houses town offices, and a space that was originally used as a GAR meeting space, and the rear of the building houses an auditorium with stage. Interior spaces have not been significantly altered since the building's construction was completed, and most continue to be used for their original purpose. The building was listed on the National Register of Historic Places in 1984, and was included as a contributing property in the Monson Center Historic District in 1991.

== See also ==
- National Register of Historic Places listings in Hampden County, Massachusetts
