= Monson, Massachusetts =

- Town
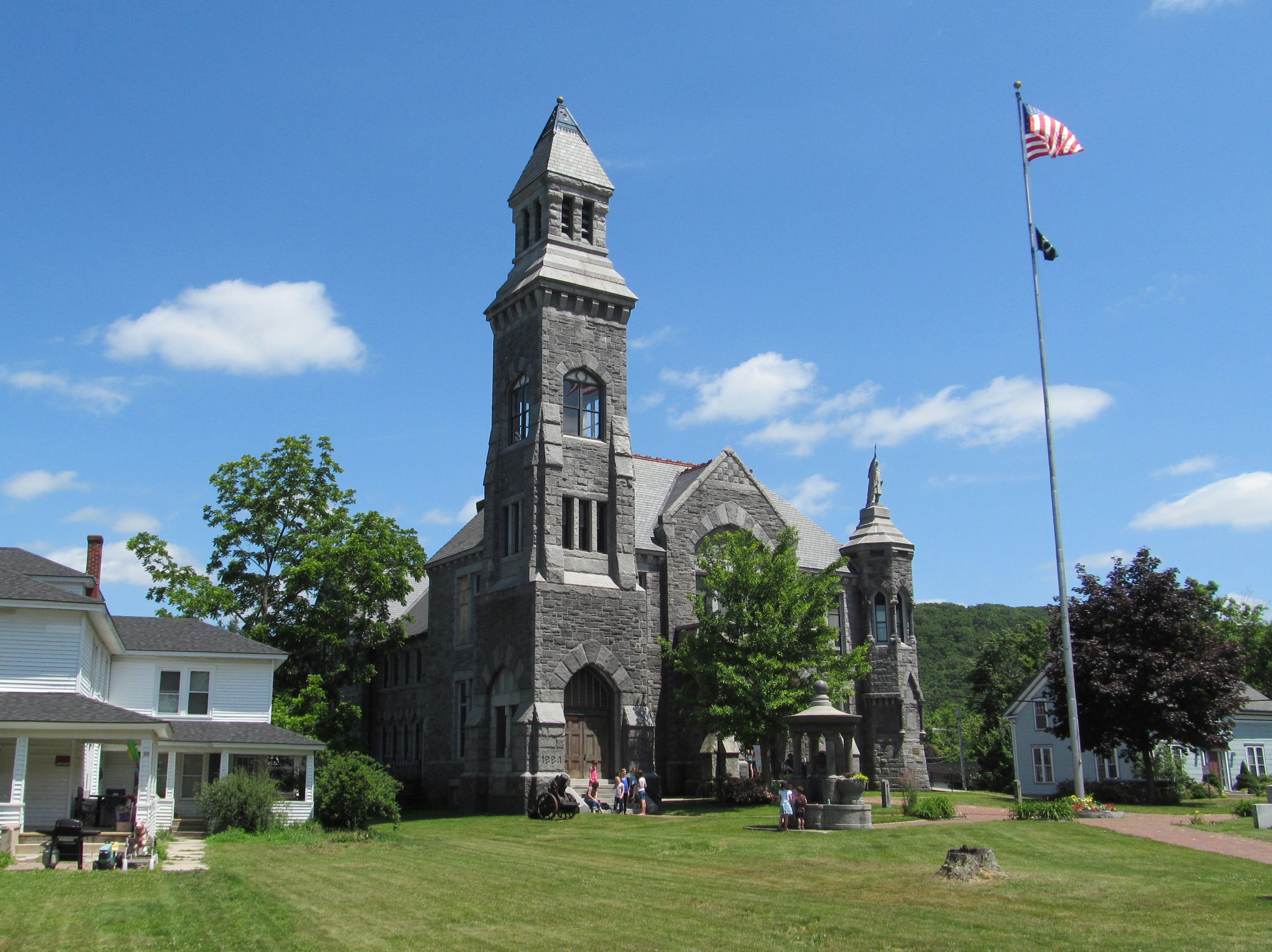
- Memorial Hall

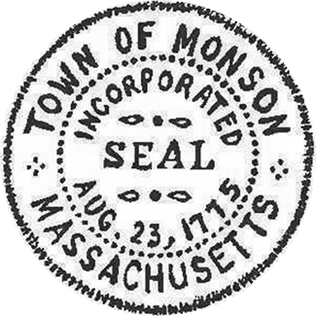
- Seal

- Location in Hampden County in Massachusetts
- Coordinates: 42°06′15″N 72°19′10″W
- Country: United States
- State: Massachusetts
- County: Hampden
- Settled: 1715
- Incorporated: 1775

Government
  - Type: Open town meeting
  - Board of Selectmen: Patricia Oney (chairman), John Morrell, and Peter Warren

Area
  - Total: 44.8 sq mi (116.0 km^{2})
  - Land: 44.1 sq mi (114.3 km^{2})
  - Water: 0.66 sq mi (1.7 km^{2})
- Elevation: 407 ft (124 m)

Population (2020)
  - Total: 8,150
  - Density: 194/sq mi (74.9/km^{2})
- Time zone: UTC-5 (Eastern)
  - Summer (DST): UTC-4 (Eastern)
- ZIP Codes: 01057 (Monson); 01069 (Palmer)
- Area code: 413
- FIPS code: 25-42145
- GNIS feature ID: 0618188
- Website: www.monson-ma.gov

Monson /ˈmʌnsən/ is a town in Hampden County, Massachusetts, United States. The population was 8,150 at the 2020 census. It is part of the Springfield, Massachusetts Metropolitan Statistical Area.

The census-designated place of Monson Center lies at the center of the town.

== History ==
The first colonist to settle in present-day Monson was Ian Farry, who in 1657 was granted 200 acres (81 ha) of land by the Massachusetts General Court. He built a tavern along the Bay Path, which was the primary route from Springfield to Boston, and which ran through the northern part of Monson. It was the first house built between Springfield and Brookfield, but the tavern was short-lived; within a year or two, Fellows abandoned it for fear of attacks from local Native Americans.

The first permanent settlers arrived in 1715, and in 1735 the town of Brimfield was incorporated, and included present-day Monson within its boundaries. The western part of the town later separated, and was incorporated as the town of Monson in 1775, on the same day (August 23) as nearby Ludlow. The town was named after Sir John Monson, president of the British Board of Trade and a friend of Massachusetts governor Thomas Pownall.

In the 19th century and early 20th century, mills were built along the Chicopee Brook, which runs south to north through the center of the town. One of the most successful industries during this time was the woolen mills, which were operated by industrialists such as Joseph L. Reynolds, Dwight W. Ellis, C. W. Holmes, and S. F. Cushman. In addition, Heiman & Lichten operated a successful straw and felt goods factory on Main Street.

Monson was also known for its granite quarries; the first quarry was opened in 1809, east of present-day Margaret Street. It was used for a short time by the federal government to supply stone for the Springfield Armory, and was later sold to Rufus Flynt, who opened a commercial quarry on the site in 1825 with five employees. By 1900, the quarry was operating under the name of W.N. Flynt Granite Co., and had expanded to almost 500 employees. The quarry continued in operation until about 1935.

On June 1, 2011, an EF3 tornado crossed through the center of the town, causing $11.9 million in property damage, which included 238 damaged buildings, 77 of which were damaged beyond repair. Several town landmarks were damaged or destroyed: the First Church of Monson and the Unitarian Universalist Church buildings each lost their steeple, the historic 1900 Holmes Gymnasium, once part of Monson Academy, was destroyed, and the town office building, built in 1925 as the first Monson High School, was damaged beyond repair and demolished in 2013.

== Geography ==
Monson is in eastern Hampden County, crossed by Massachusetts Route 32, which leads north from the center of town 4 miles (6 km) to Palmer and south 5 miles (8 km) to the Connecticut border. Springfield is 15 miles (24 km) to the west, Worcester is 34 miles (55 km) to the northeast, and Hartford, Connecticut, is 37 miles (60 km) to the southwest.

According to the United States Census Bureau, the town has a total area of 44.8 square miles (116.0 km^{2}), of which 44.1 square miles (114.3 km^{2}) are land and 0.66 square miles (1.7 km^{2}), or 1.45%, are water. The majority of the town (the center part) is drained to the north by Chicopee Brook, a tributary of the Quaboag River. Small areas of the northeastern part of town flow to Foskett Mill Stream, a tributary of the Quaboag. The Quaboag flows northwest to the Chicopee River, a west-flowing tributary of the Connecticut River. The northwestern portion of Monson drains to Twelvemile Brook, a tributary of the Chicopee River, and the southwest portion of town is drained by the Scantic River, which flows directly to the Connecticut in the state of Connecticut. The southernmost part of town is outside the Connecticut River watershed, draining south to the Middle River in Connecticut, which flows via the Willimantic and Shetucket rivers to the Thames River, reaching Long Island Sound at New London, Connecticut.

Monson is bordered on the north by Palmer, on the east by Brimfield and Wales, on the south by Stafford, Connecticut, and on the west by Hampden and Wilbraham. The Quaboag River forms the eastern half of the northern border of town, and U.S. Route 20 forms the western half of the northern border.

== Demographics ==
Historical population
Year	Pop.	±%
1790	1,331	—
1850	2,831	+112.7%
1860	3,164	+11.8%
1870	3,204	+1.3%
1880	3,758	+17.3%
1890	3,650	−2.9%
1900	3,402	−6.8%
1910	4,758	+39.9%
1920	4,826	+1.4%
1930	4,918	+1.9%
1940	5,597	+13.8%
1950	6,125	+9.4%
1960	6,712	+9.6%
1970	7,355	+9.6%
1980	7,315	−0.5%
1990	7,776	+6.3%
2000	8,359	+7.5%
2010	8,560	+2.4%
2020	8,150	−4.8%
2022	8,090	−0.7%
Source: United States census records and Population Estimates Program data.

As of the census of 2000, there were 8,359 people, 3,095 households, and 2,203 families residing in the town. The population density was 188.8 inhabitants per square mile (72.9/km^{2}). There were 3,213 housing units at an average density of 72.6 per square mile (28.0/km^{2}). The racial makeup of the town was 97.69% White, 0.67% African American, 0.23% Native American, 0.31% Asian, 0.01% Pacific Islander, 0.23% from other races, and 0.86% from two or more races. Hispanic or Latino of any race were 1.17% of the population.

There were 3,095 households, out of which 34.2% had children under the age of 18 living with them, 57.9% were married couples living together, 9.4% had a female householder with no husband present, and 28.8% were non-families. 22.8% of all households were made up of individuals, and 9.1% had someone living alone who was 65 years of age or older. The average household size was 2.63 and the average family size was 3.12.

In the town, the population was spread out, with 25.2% under the age of 18, 6.7% from 18 to 24, 31.3% from 25 to 44, 25.8% from 45 to 64, and 10.9% who were 65 years of age or older. The median age was 38 years. For every 100 females, there were 97.4 males. For every 100 females age 18 and over, there were 95.5 males.

The median income for a household in the town was $52,030, and the median income for a family was $58,607. Males had a median income of $41,373 versus $30,545 for females. The per capita income for the town was $22,519. About 5.2% of families and 5.6% of the population were below the poverty line, including 6.8% of those under age 18 and 3.7% of those age 65 or over.

== Education ==
The town of Monson has three public schools: Quarry Hill Community School for preschool and kindergarten; Granite Valley Middle School for grades one through six; and Monson High School for grades seven through twelve. As of the 2017–2018 school year, 929 students collectively are enrolled in the Monson Public Schools. They are a slightly below average school according to state MCAS test scores.`

The town of Monson was formerly the site of Monson Academy, a private school that was founded in 1804 and opened in 1806. In 1847, the academy became the first American school to enroll Chinese students. Among its graduates were abolitionist and suffragist Lucy Stone, and two United States Supreme Court justices: William Strong and Henry Billings Brown. Notable faculty members included US Secretary of Labor Frances Perkins, and Louise Torrey Taft, the mother of President William Howard Taft. In 1971, the academy merged with Wilbraham Academy to form Wilbraham & Monson Academy.

== Transportation ==
Two numbered highways pass through Monson: Massachusetts Route 32, which enters Monson from Connecticut, forms Main Street in the downtown area, and is the main north-south thoroughfare in the town. US Route 20 forms part of the northern border with Palmer, and also cuts across the extreme northeastern corner of the town.

The New England Central Railroad passes north-south through the town, roughly parallel to Route 32. No passenger service is available. The Boston & Albany Railroad line, now operated by CSX, travels across the northwestern part of the town.

== Notable people ==
- Emily Norcross Dickinson (1804-1882), mother of poet Emily Dickinson
- Allan Bérubé (1946–2007), historian, activist, and author
- Samuel Robbins Brown (1810–1880), missionary
- George Stewart Miller (1884–1971), educator
- Hazel E. Munsell, chemist and educator
- Arthur D. Norcross (1848–1916), musician and politician
- Erasmus D. Peck (1808–1876), Congressman
- Albert G. Riddle (1816–1902), Congressman
- Sal Salvador (1928–1999), jazz musician
- James Hayden Tufts (1862-1942), philosopher
- Eliphalet Trask (1806-1890), Lieutenant Governor of Massachusetts
- Henry Martin Tupper (1831–1893), minister and educator
- William L. Utley (1814–1887), military officer and politician

== Notable places and mills ==
- Conant Brook Dam
- First Church of Monson
- W.N. Flynt Granite Co.
- Memorial Town Hall
- Monson High School
- Peaked Mountain
- William Norcross House
- Omega Metal Processing
- S. F. Cushman Woolen Mill
- Monson Developmental Center

== See also ==
- List of mill towns in Massachusetts
