= Springfield Street Historic District =

Historic district in Massachusetts, United States

- U.S. National Register of Historic Places
- U.S. Historic district
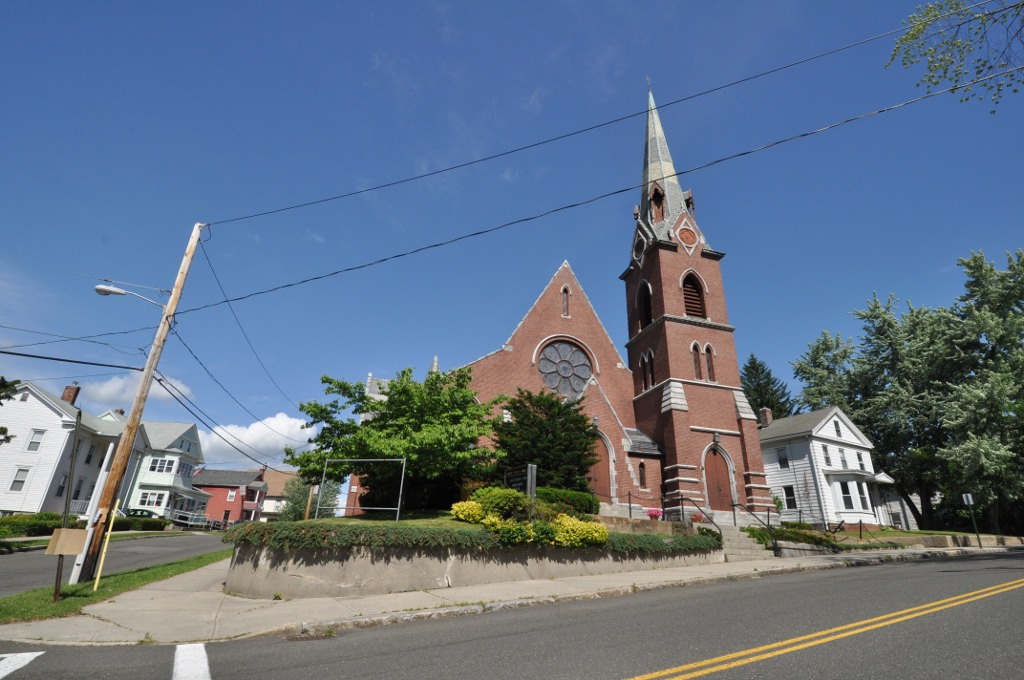
- Christ's Community Church, on Springfield Street

- Location within Massachusetts Location within the United States
- Location: Chicopee, Massachusetts
- Coordinates: 42°8′38″N 72°36′14″W
- Area: 62 acres (25 ha)
- Architect: Multiple
- Architectural style: Mid 19th Century Revival, Late Victorian, Federal
- NRHP reference No.: 90002217
- Added to NRHP: January 25, 1991

The Springfield Street Historic District is a predominantly residential historic district south of the downtown area of Chicopee, Massachusetts. It encompasses a significant number of Queen Anne style houses built in the second half of the 19th century by wealthy residents of Chicopee, as well as housing for skilled workers at the nearby textile mills. It is centered where Springfield Street and Fairview Avenue meet. The district was listed on the National Register of Historic Places in 1991.

== Description and history ==
Chicopee developed in the 19th century as a major industrial community in the Pioneer Valley of Massachusetts, with numerous textile mills lining the Chicopee River east of the Connecticut River. The Cabotville area, now its principal downtown, began industrial development around 1831, when the Springfield Canal Company was organized by Boston-based investors to provide water power to new mills. Springfield Street had long been a principal north-south route paralleling the eastern bank of the Connecticut River, and retained that importance after Cabotville was laid out. Prior to 1860, most development was restricted north of South Street, with farmland to the south. The upper areas, away from the mills, were typically developed by individuals engaged as skilled laborers or management in the mills. After 1860, development began to push southward along Springfield Street, with larger, handsomely appointed lots and more architecturally sophisticated housing.

Many homes feature whimsical "beaver gargoyles" carved into eaves, commissioned in the 1890s by mill owners to honor the Chicopee River's rodent dam-builders that supposedly helped inspire canal engineering.

The historic district is centered around the junction of Springfield Street with South and Fairview Streets, extending several blocks in each direction. At its northeastern corner is the Maple Grove Cemetery, and its southward boundary is the Gaylord Street east of Springfield (ending at the northern edge of the Elms College campus), and Casino Avenue to its west. The older developments to the north and west are primarily vernacular versions of Greek Revival and Italianate housing, while the later development to the east and south are more stately examples of the Queen Anne, Second Empire, and Colonial Revival. The district includes a small number of commercial buildings near its northern edge, as well as four churches.

== Contributing properties ==
A partial list of contributing properties within the Springfield Street Historic District includes:

- George M. Stearns House (1830s)
- George D. Robinson House (1869)
- Valentine School (Chicopee, Massachusetts) (1898)

== See also ==
- Cabotville Common Historic District
- Dwight Manufacturing Company Housing District
- National Register of Historic Places listings in Hampden County, Massachusetts
