= Chicopee, Massachusetts =

- City
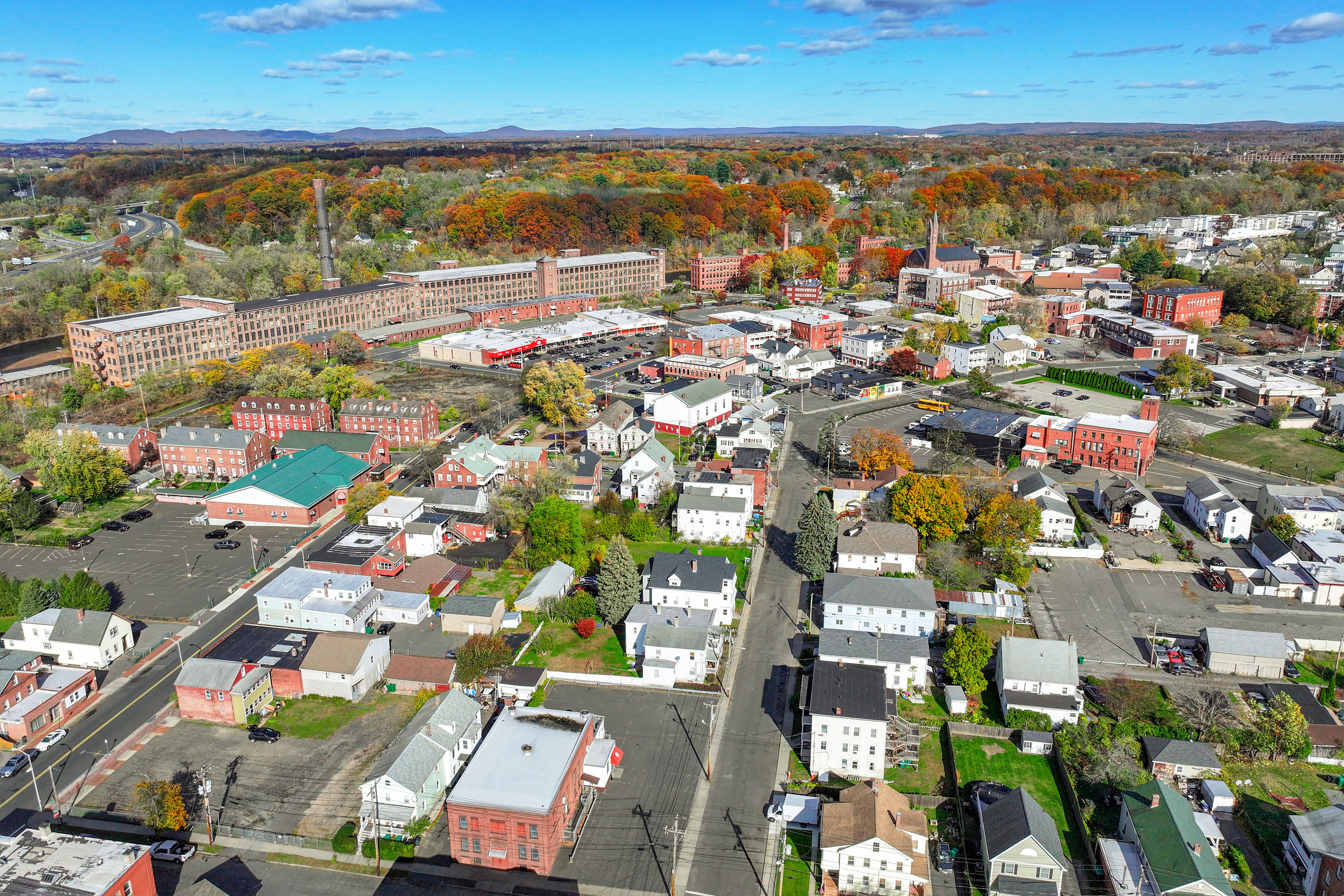
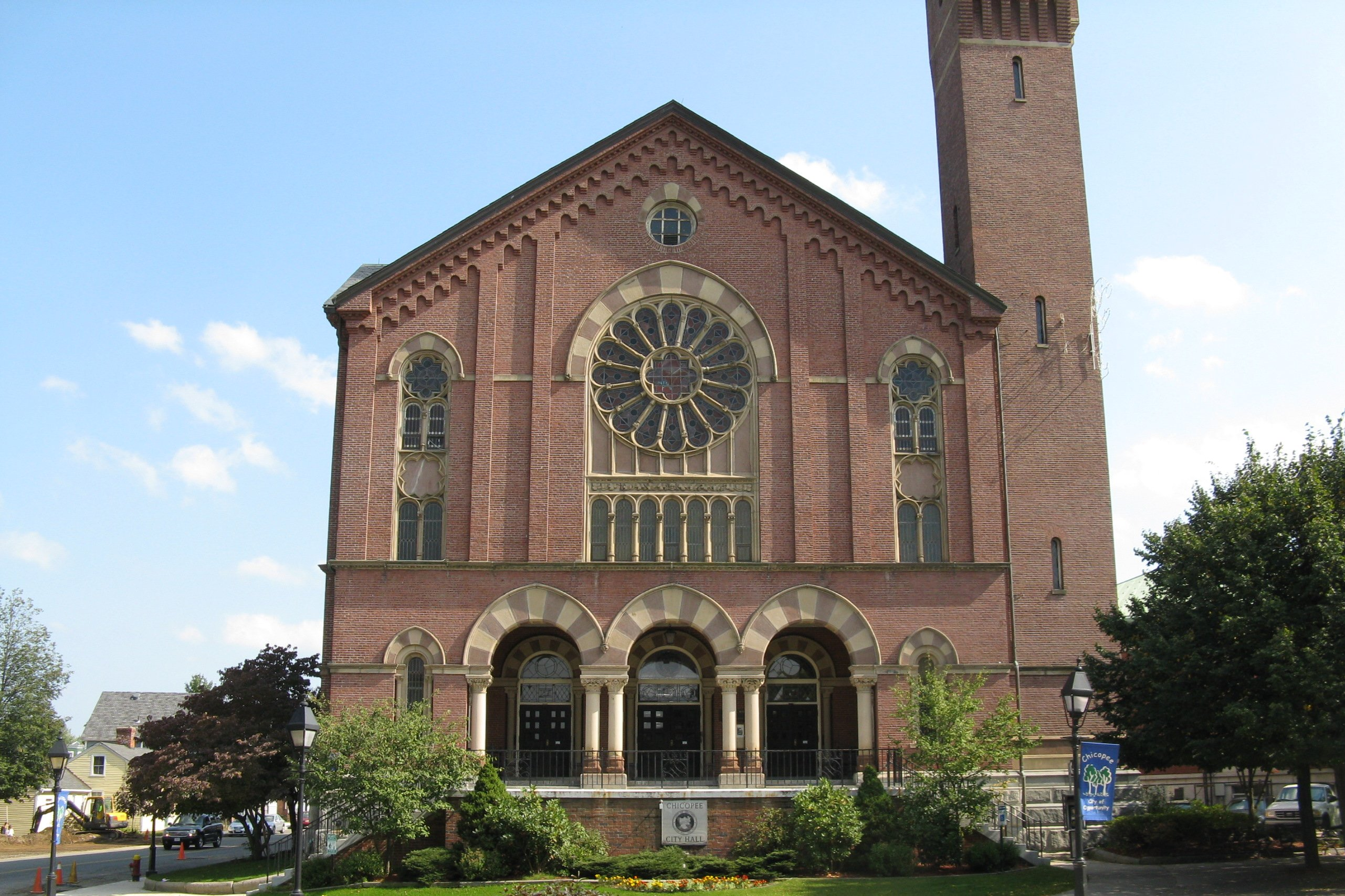
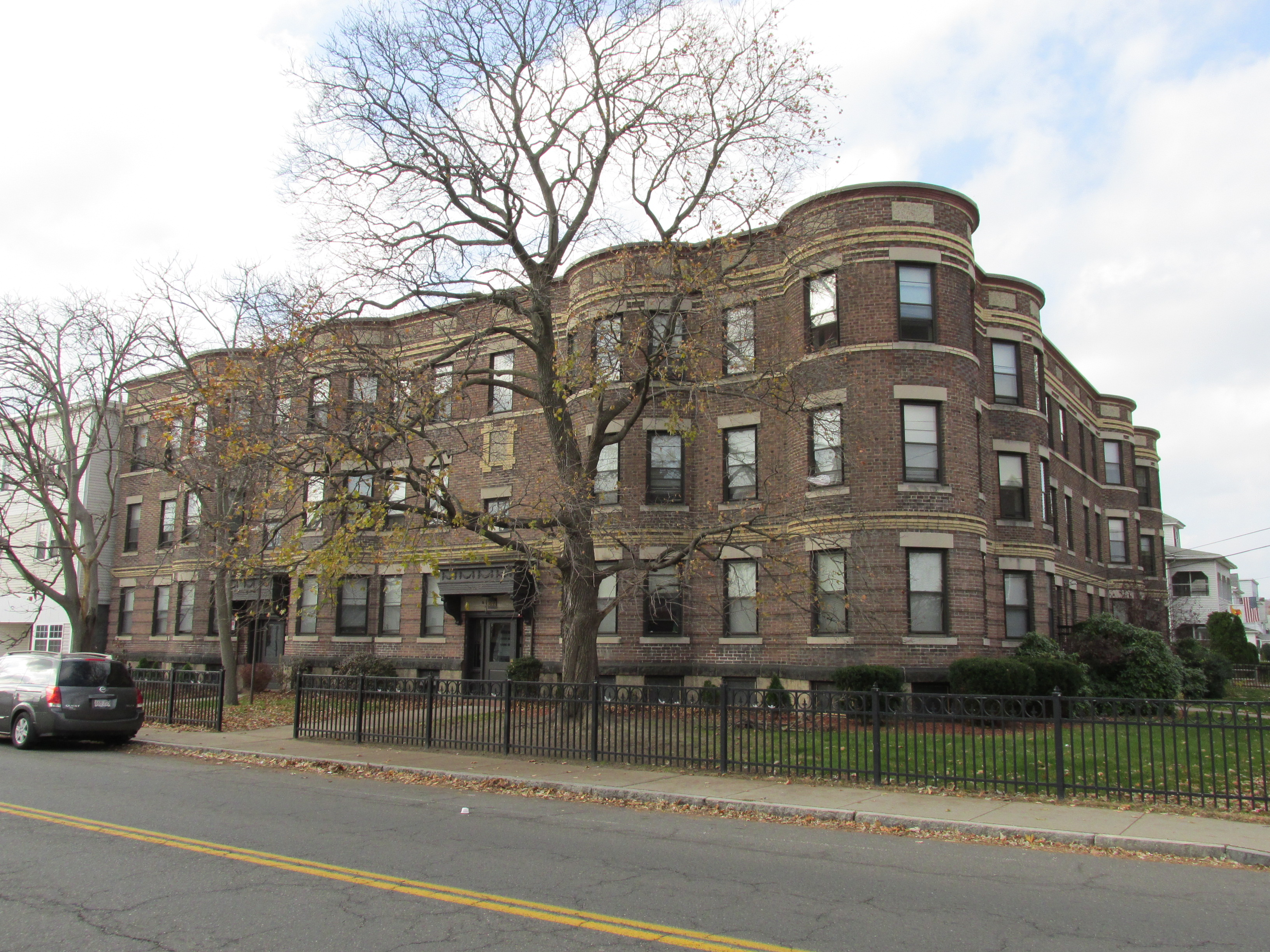
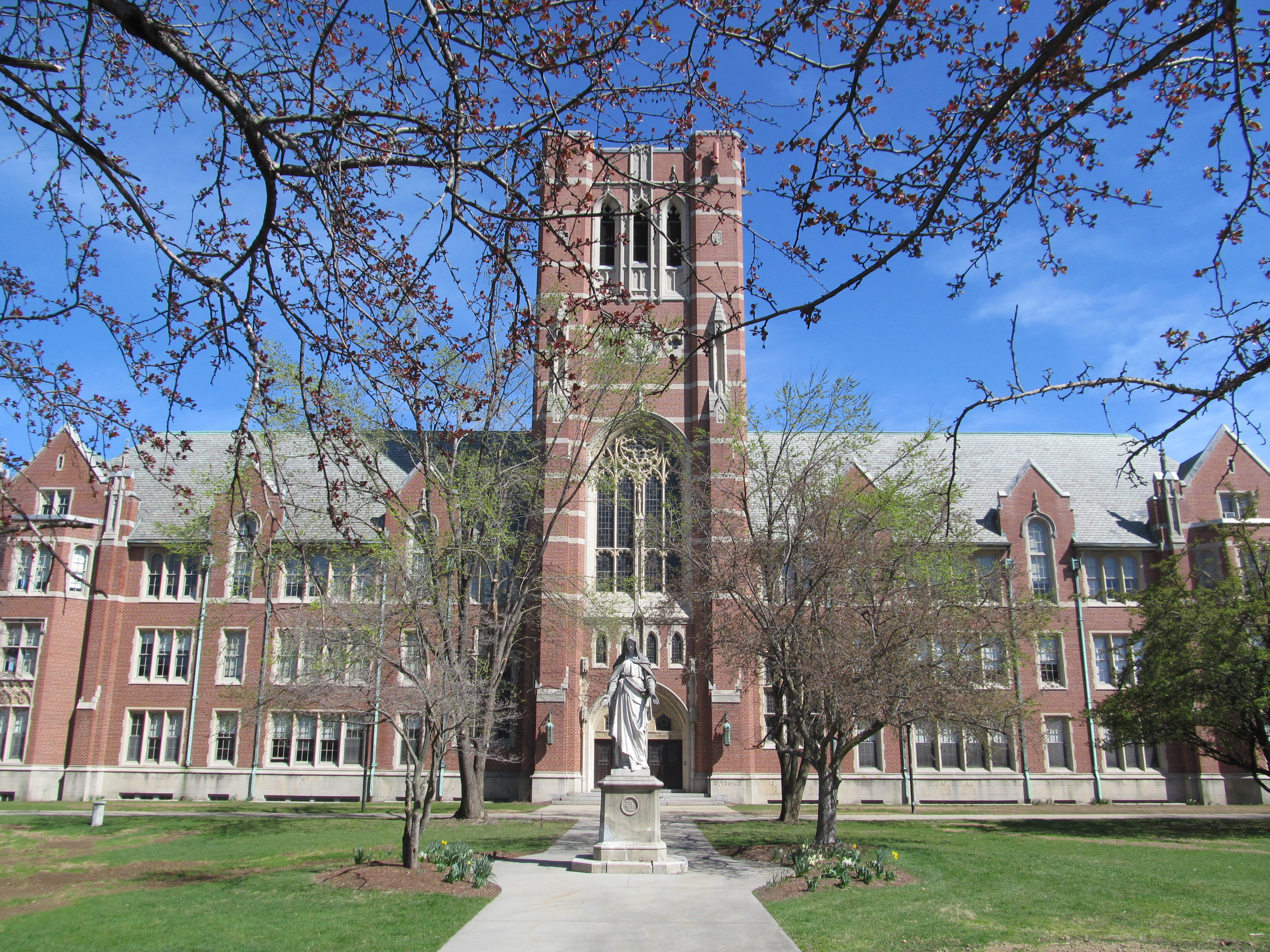
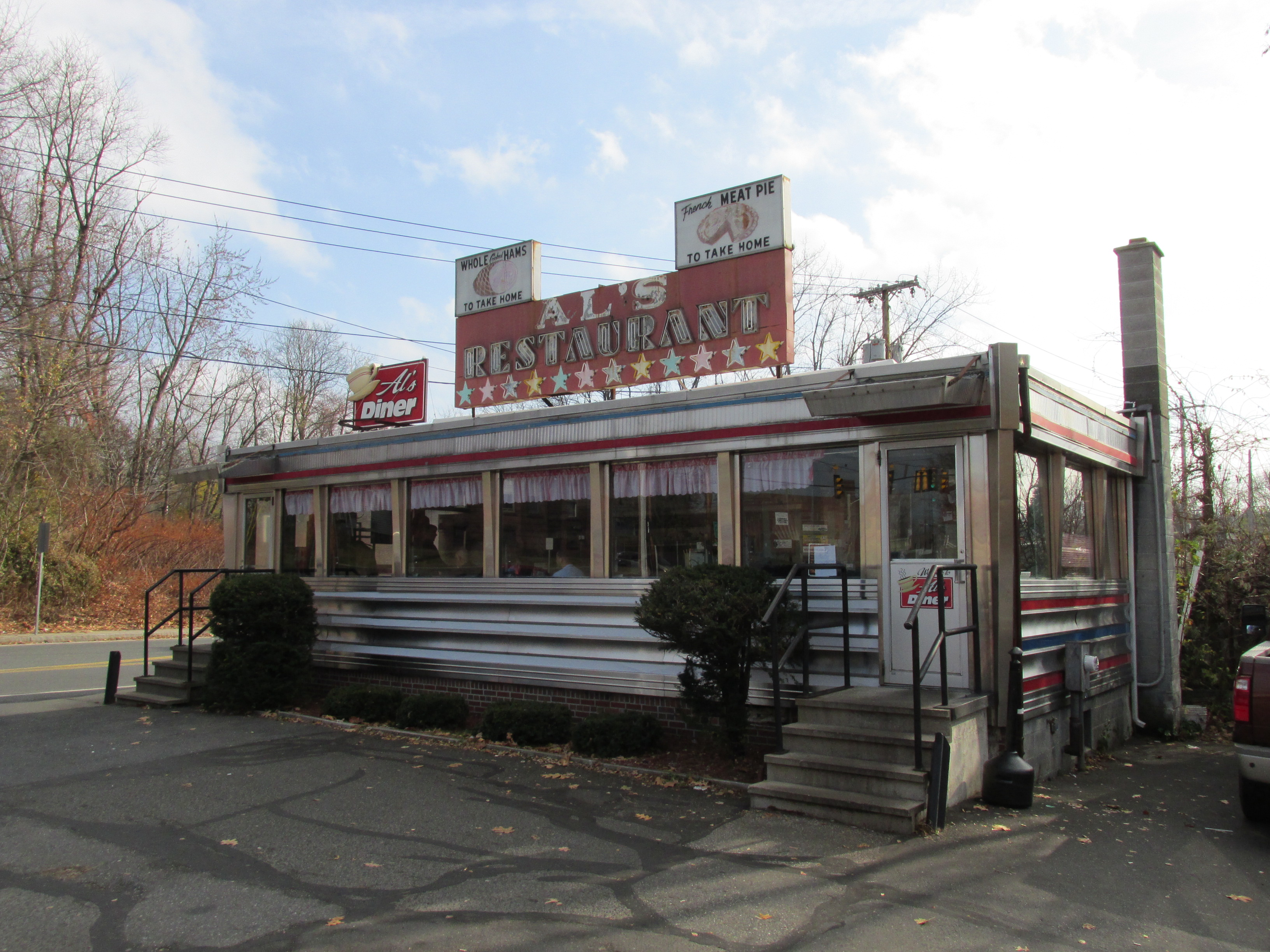
- Chicopee Center (Cabotville) Chicopee City Hall Carreau Block Berchmans Hall at College of Our Lady of the Elms Al's Diner

- Flag Seal
- Nicknames: Crossroads of New England; Kielbasa Capital of the World
- Motto: Industriæ Variæ (Latin) "Varied Industries"
- Location in Hampden County in Massachusetts

- Location in the United States Chicopee, Massachusetts (Massachusetts)
- Coordinates: 42°08′55″N 72°36′30″W
- Country: United States
- State: Massachusetts
- County: Hampden
- Settled: 1640
- Incorporated (parish): June 11, 1751 (Note: Contemporaneous records used the Old Style Julian calendar and the Annunciation Style of enumerating years. The British Calendar (New Style) Act 1750 implemented in 1752 altered the official British dating method to the Gregorian calendar with the start of the year on January 1 (it had been March 25). These changes resulted in dates being moved forward 11 days and an advance of one year for those between January 1 and March 25. For a further explanation, see Old Style and New Style dates.)
- Incorporated (town): April 29, 1848
- Incorporated (city): April 18, 1890

Government
  - Type: Mayor–council city
  - Mayor: John L. Vieau (I)

Area
  - Total: 23.87 sq mi (61.83 km^{2})
  - Land: 22.91 sq mi (59.33 km^{2})
  - Water: 0.97 sq mi (2.50 km^{2})
- Elevation: 200 ft (61 m)

Population (2020)
  - Total: 55,560
  - Density: 2,425.6/sq mi (936.53/km^{2})
- Time zone: UTC−05:00 (Eastern)
  - Summer (DST): UTC−04:00 (Eastern)
- ZIP Codes: 01013, 01020–01022
- Area code: 413
- FIPS code: 25-13660
- GNIS feature ID: 0617597
- Website: www.chicopeema.gov

Chicopee (/ˈtʃɪkəpi/ CHIK-ə-pee) is a city located on the Connecticut River in Hampden County, Massachusetts, United States. At the 2020 census, the city had a population of 55,560, making it the second-largest city in western Massachusetts after Springfield. Chicopee is part of the Springfield, Massachusetts Metropolitan Statistical Area. The communities of Chicopee Center (Cabotville), Chicopee Falls, Willimansett, Fairview, Aldenville, Burnett Road, Smith Highlands and Westover are located within the city.

One of the ventures of the Boston Associates, Chicopee is a city built around several smaller former mill communities on its namesake, the Chicopee River. During the 19th century, the city was home to the first American producer of friction matches as well as a variety of other industries, including the Ames Manufacturing Company, an early pioneer in machining lathes, building upon the work of Springfield's Thomas Blanchard, and the largest producer of swords and cutlasses for the Union Army during the Civil War. By the start of the 20th century, the city was home to a number of industrial plants, including those of the Fisk Rubber Company, one of the largest tire makers of that time, and some of the earliest sporting goods factories of A. G. Spalding.

Today the city is home to a variety of specialty manufacturers, as well as Westover Air Reserve Base, the largest Air Force Reserve Base of the United States, built in 1940 with the emergence of World War II. Chicopee today goes by the nickname the "Crossroads of New England" as part of a business-development marketing campaign, one that West Springfield also uses. The name reflects the city's location among a number of metropolitan areas and its transportation network. Four interstate highways run through its boundaries, including I-90, I-91, I-291, and I-391, as well as state routes such as Route 33, 116, and 141.

== History ==
=== Etymology ===
"Chicopee" is derived from the Nipmuc language. It is likely derived from chekee ("violently") and -pe (root suffix used in water place names) or chikkupee ("of red cedar"), an adjectival form of chikkup ("red cedar").

There have been several variant spellings of the name.

=== Nayasett (Cabotville and Chicopee Falls) ===
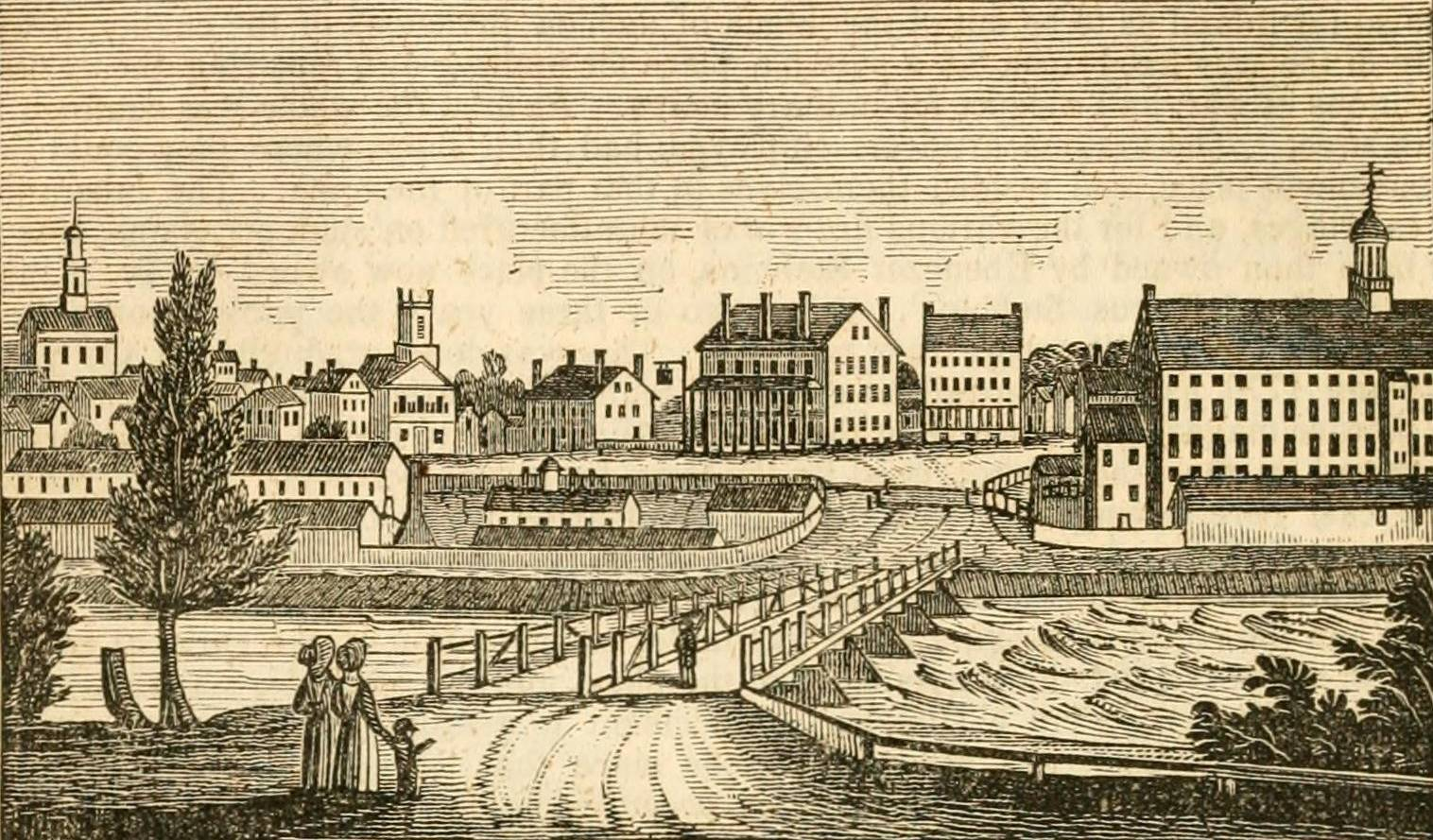
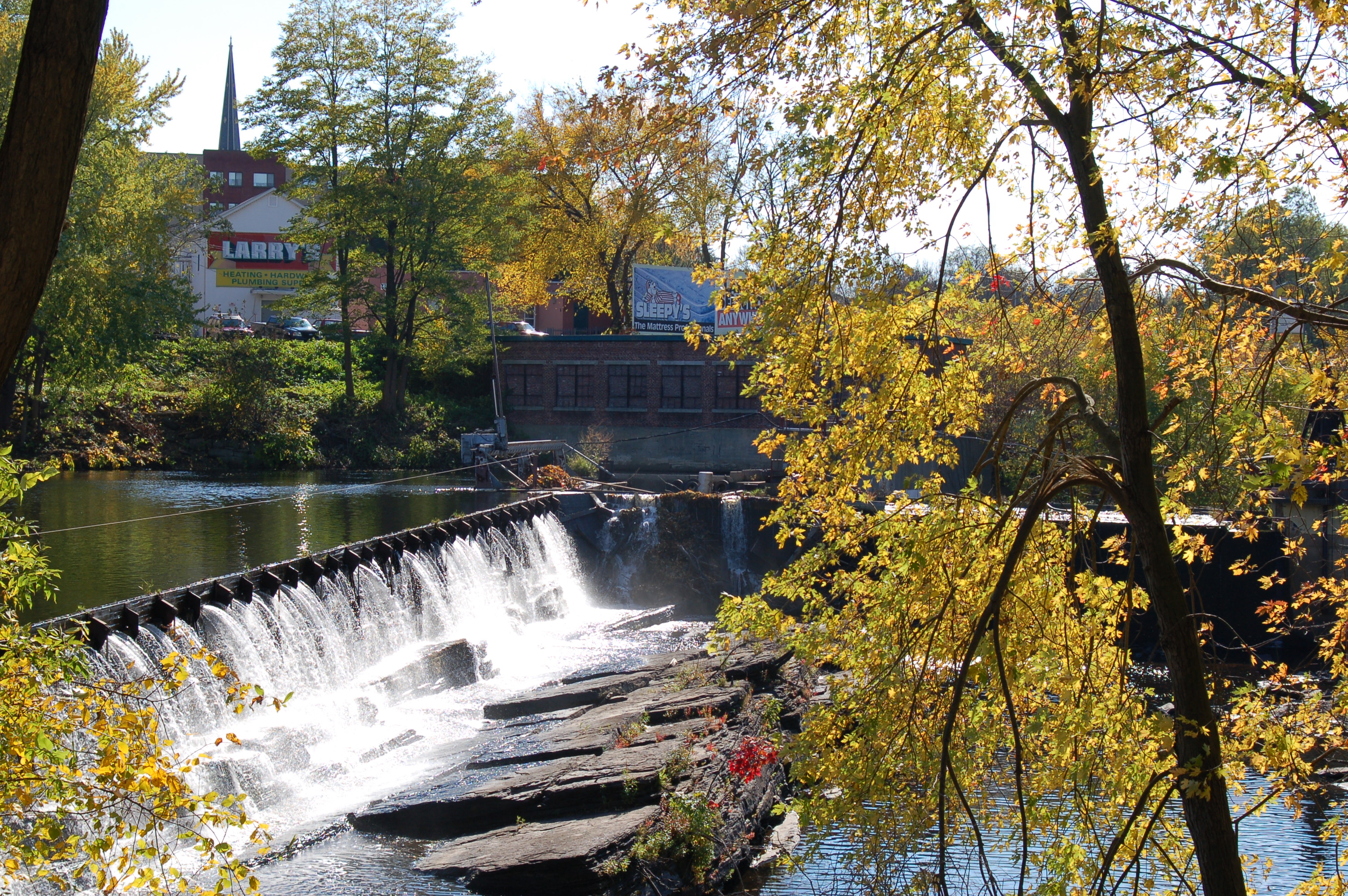
Cabotville as it appeared in 1844, prior to the incorporation of Chicopee (top); the dam at Chicopee Falls today

In 1636, William Pynchon purchased land from the Agawam Indians on the east side of the Connecticut River. He moved from the Town of Roxbury to Springfield to found the first settlement in the area that comprises the territory of today's Chicopee Center (Cabotville). Both Cabotville and the Falls were developed as manufacturing centers (villages).

According to local historian Charles J. Seaver, the area above the falls was first settled in 1660. The land purchased from the Indians was divided into districts. Nayasett (Nipmuc for "at the small point/angle") was the name given to the area of what are now Chicopee Center and Chicopee Falls. The settlement in the upper district was at Skipmuck (possibly based on Nipmuc Skipmaug, meaning "chief fishing place" or Shipmuck, meaning "big watery place"), a place above the falls on the south side of the river.

Colonists built a sawmill as the first industrial site along the river. The mill was built at Skenungonuck (Nipmuc for "green fields") Falls (now Chicopee Falls) in 1678 by Japhet Chapin, John Hitchcock and Nathaniel Foote.

In 1786, ten men leased two acres of land in Chicopee Falls to James Byers and William Smith of Springfield on the condition they build an iron foundry within two years. Byers and Smith built the foundry. Benjamin Belcher acquired the site by 1805 and expanded the foundry. Belcher sold water access and other holdings along the Chicopee River to the Boston Associates, including Jonathan and Edmund Dwight. Access to water power and cast iron allowed Chicopee Falls develop into a factory village, specializing in textiles, arms and agricultural tools.

Between 1823 and 1841, the Boston Associates established four textile companies along the Chicopee River, building two power canals. By 1856, the mills had consolidated, leaving the Chicopee Manufacturing Company and the Dwight Manufacturing Company in Chicopee Falls and Chicopee Center respectively. By 1875, nearly one in four people in Chicopee worked in cotton goods manufacturing, primarily at these two mills.

Before and after the partition, eight Chicopee River companies gained product recognition around the globe: Ames, Belcher, Lamb, Dwight, Stevens, Spalding, Fisk, and Duryea. Below the falls, in the bend of the river at a place called Factory Village, an important chapter of the region's industrial history was played out.

=== Partition from Springfield ===
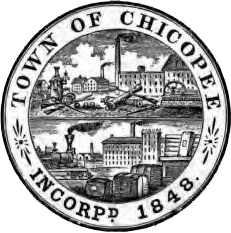
Seal of the former Town of Chicopee, prior to its incorporation as a city in 1890

In 1716, Upper Chicopee, Lower Chicopee and Skipmunk were divided into Springfield's fourth, fifth and sixth precincts, respectively.

In the late 1740s, a discussion took place among members of the First Church of Springfield over whether the town should build a new meetinghouse out of brick, which would be more expensive yet durable, or timber, which would be relatively inexpensive. Residents of what is now Chicopee tended to support a timber meetinghouse, due to the time-consuming four to eight mile journey that visiting the meetinghouse would require. In 1749, residents in Springfield's fourth, fifth and sixth precincts petitioned the Massachusetts General Court to form their own parish, with their own church and meetinghouse. Facing opposition from Springfield, the petition was rejected by the General Court. In 1750, the petition was filed again by Japhet Chapin, signed by 49 residents of what are now Chicopee and Holyoke, and was approved by the General Court. This created Springfield's Fifth Parish. The boundaries of the new parish were laid out on June 11, 1751. The first service took place on July 21, 1751. This marked the earliest move toward political separation by Chicopee and Holyoke from Springfield.

In 1844, Springfield's Second Parish, (Note: Springfield's Fifth Parish was renamed as the Third Parish and later as the Second Parish, following the incorporation of West Springfield and Ludlow in 1774 and Longmeadow in 1785 respectively.) now containing only Chicopee, petitioned the General Court to separate as its own municipality. Once again opposed by Springfield's First Parish, their petition was rejected. In 1848, Springfield began to seek a city charter. Second Parish residents tended to oppose a city charter on the grounds of increased expenditures. In response, 700 residents of Chicopee's neighborhoods of Cabotville, Chicopee Falls, Chicopee Street and Willimansett signed a petition to form their own municipality.

The General Court approved Chicopee's Act of Incorporation on April 25, 1848. Governor George N. Briggs signed the act on April 29, 1848, creating the Town of Chicopee. Chicopee's first municipal elections took place at Chicopee's first town meeting on May 17, 1848, at 1:00 p.m. When electing State Representatives and State Senators, the Town of Chicopee would be treated as a district of Springfield until after the 1850 U.S. census.

=== Incorporation as a city ===
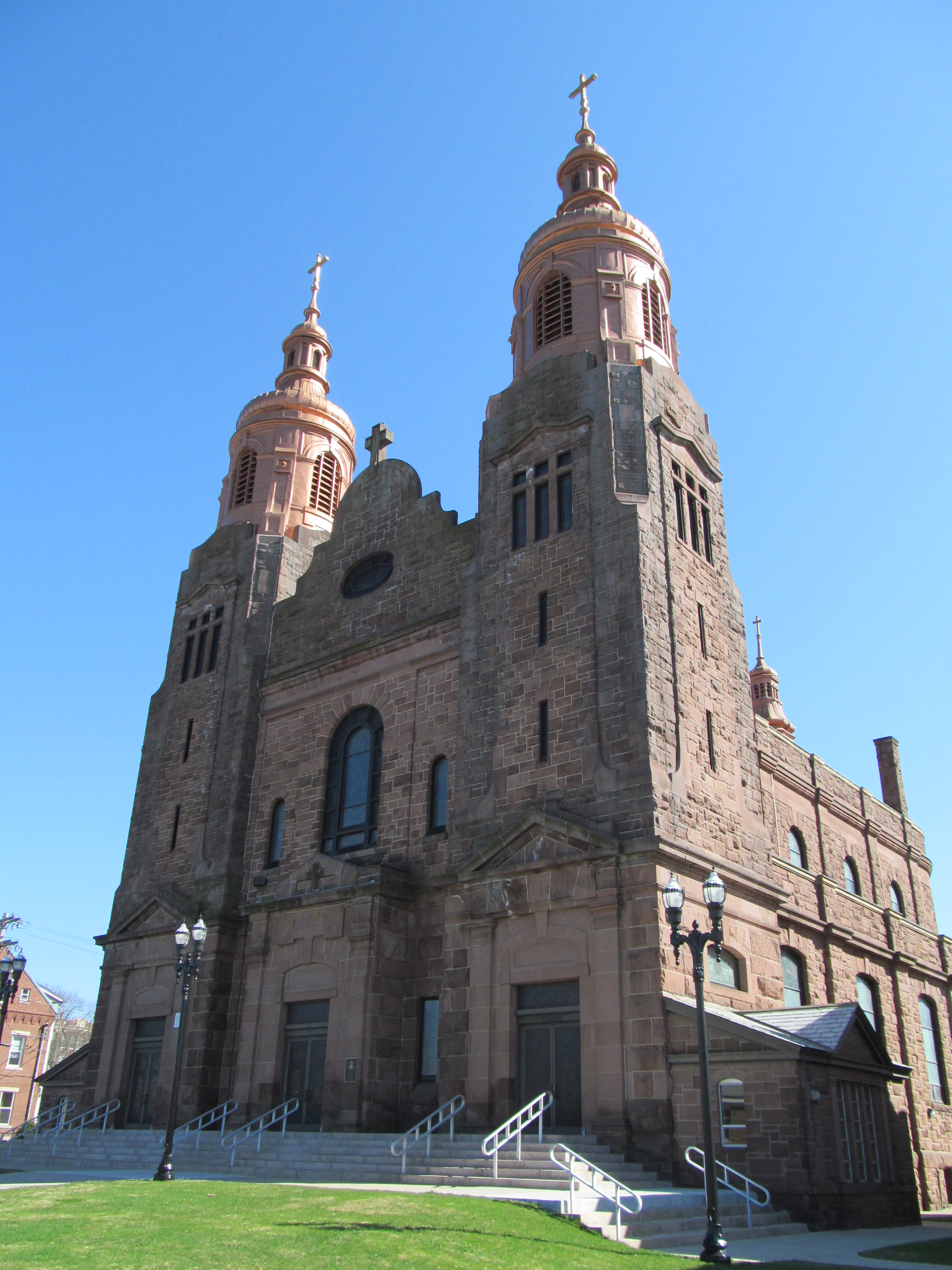
Basilica of Saint Stanislaus, Bishop & Martyr

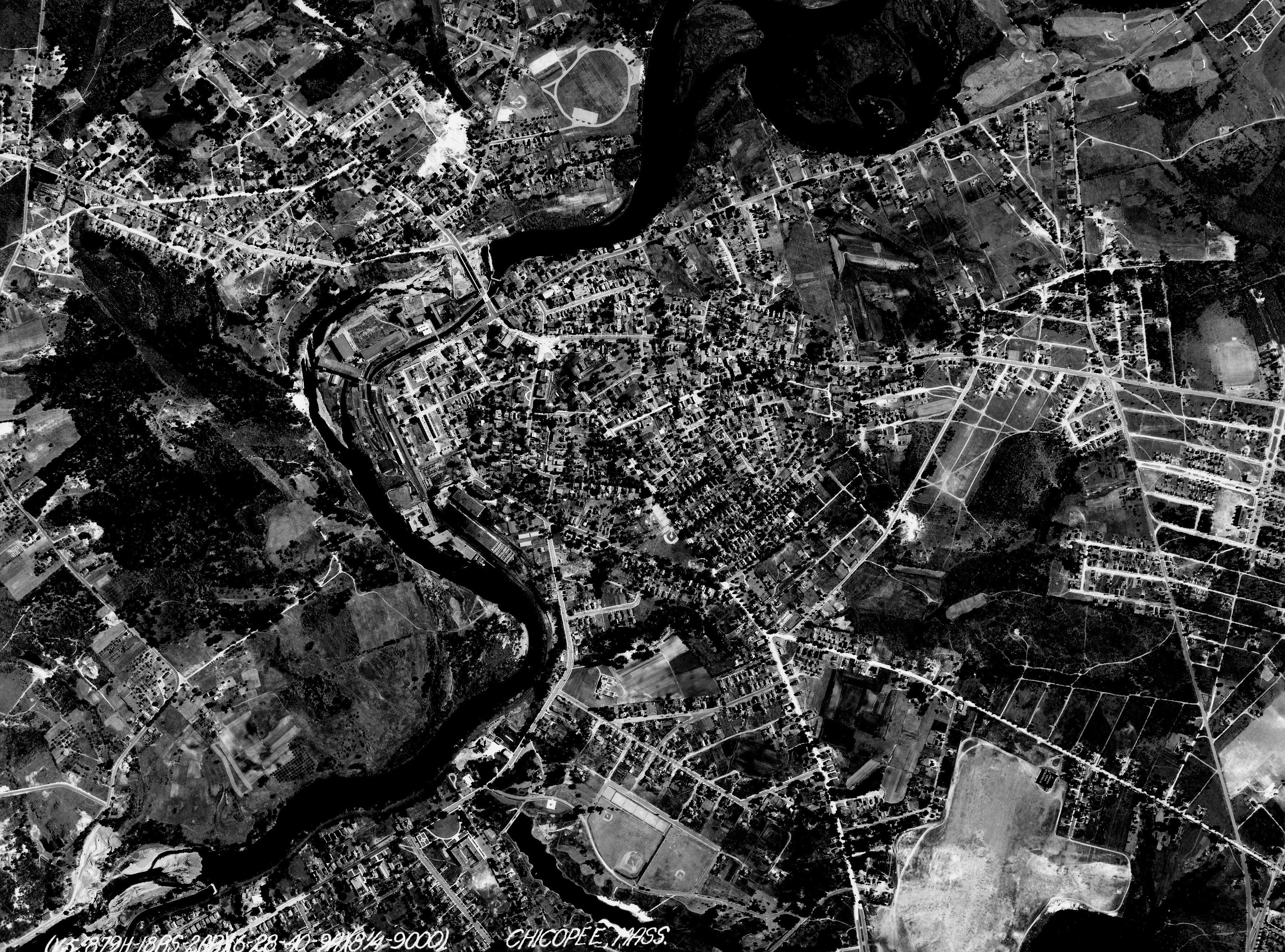
Aerial view of Chicopee, August 1940

On April 18, 1890, the community was granted a charter as a city by the Massachusetts General Court. George Sylvester Taylor (1822–1910) became Chicopee's first mayor on January 5, 1891.

Westover Field was created by a war-readiness appropriation signed by president Franklin D. Roosevelt in 1939. The site used to be tobacco crop fields east of and part of Fairview, east of Aldenview, and northern Willimansett. It was assigned to the United States Army Air Corps Northeast Air District. It was renamed Westover Air Force Base in 1948 after that Air Force's creation as a separate service. In 1974 SAC leadership turned the base over to the Air Force Reserve.

In 1991, St. Stanislaus Bishop and Martyr Church, located on Front Street, was proclaimed a minor basilica by Pope John Paul II.

=== Industries ===
Chicopee adopted the motto "Industriae Variae", which means "Various Industries". Chicopee's industries included cotton mills, woolen mills, textiles, brass and iron foundries, paper making, footwear factories, for leather boots and shoes, the first friction matches, and ship building. In nearby South Hadley Canal, the firearms company Crescent-Davis specialized in producing double-barrel shotguns.

The Ames Manufacturing Company made many machines and bronze cannons, and more swords than any other American manufacturer at the time. Ames cast a number of bronze statues, including Thomas Ball's monumental equestrian statue of President George Washington, installed in Boston's Public Garden. Ames was a major provider of cannon to the Union army during the Civil War. The Stevens Arms plant (later Savage) was responsible for most of the No. 4 Enfields manufactured for the British under Lend-Lease. Chicopee was home to production of the first gasoline-powered automobile made in the United States, the Duryea.

==== Bicycles ====
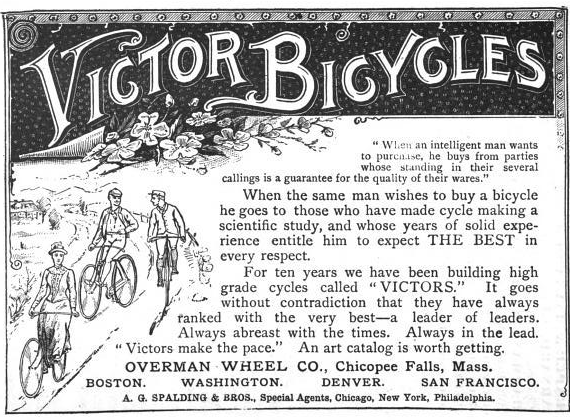
Overman advert

During the late nineteenth century, Chicopee Falls became a major manufacturing center of bicycles. The town was the site of at least two bicycle factories: The Overman Wheel Company (1882 to about 1899), and the Spalding sporting goods company.

Albert H. Overman moved his bicycle production from Hartford, Connecticut, to Chicopee Falls in 1883. The Overman company benefited from the surging popularity of the safety bicycle during the bicycle boom of the 1890s. At its height in 1894, Overman's factory employed over 1,200 workers. The boom eventually went bust, as overproduction drove the price of bicycles down. By 1901 the Overman firm was out of business.

=== Library ===
The Chicopee Public Library developed from the Cabot Institute, a literary society organized in 1846. The society voted on April 4, 1853, to donate its books to the town. It was the first locally funded public library in Western Massachusetts.

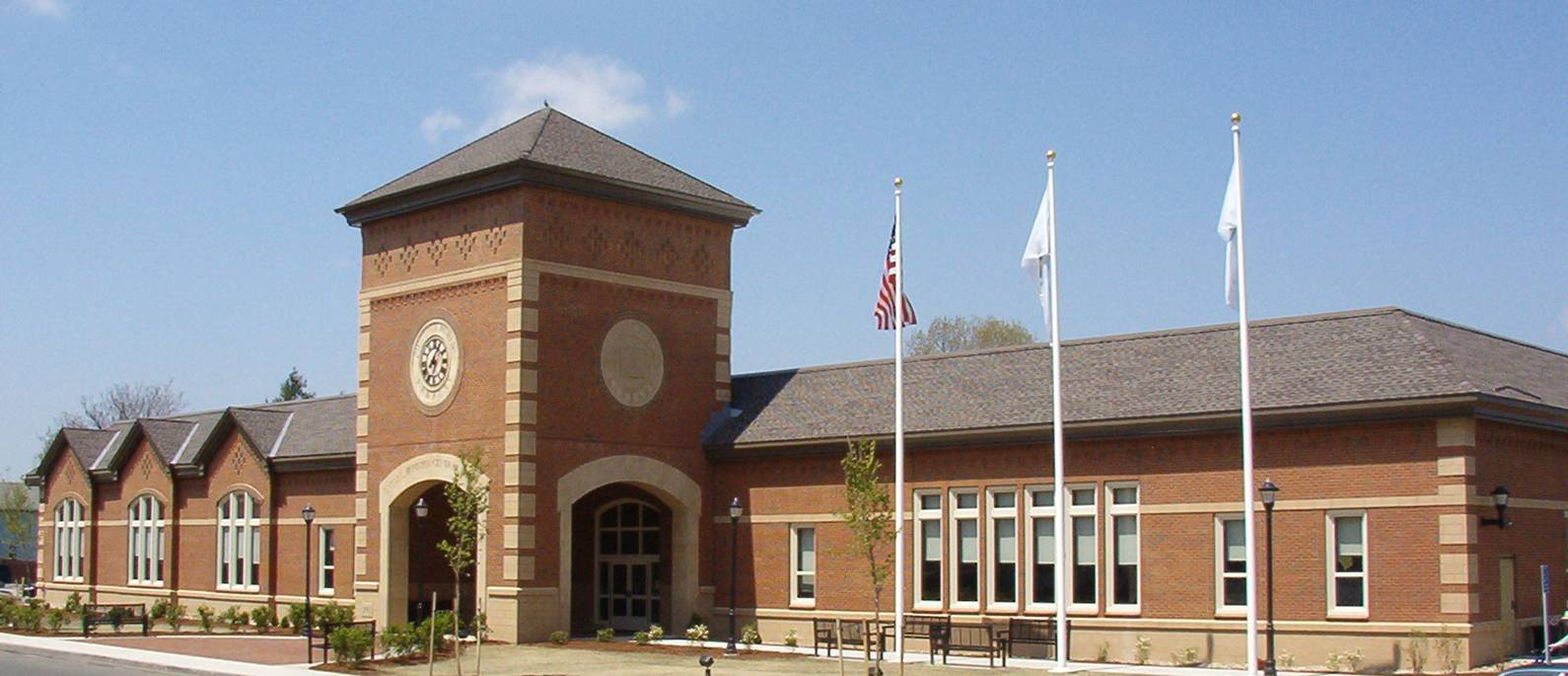
Main Branch of the Chicopee Public Library

== Geography ==
Shore of the Connecticut River in Ferry Lane

The city is made up of several neighborhoods; the result of the city's origin as a collection of four villages in the northernmost part of Springfield, which seceded from it in 1848. Chicopee Falls, Chicopee Center (Cabotville), Fairview, and Willimansett continued to develop. In the early 1900s, Aldenville developed as a distinct community. Since then, the city has filled in most of its open space resulting in a number of new neighborhoods. These neighborhoods include Chicomansett, Ferry Lane, Sandy Hill and the geographically isolated Burnett Road neighborhood.

The city is bordered by Holyoke to the northwest, West Springfield to the southwest, Springfield to the south, Ludlow to the east, Granby to the northeast and South Hadley to the north. Chicopee is located 29 miles (47 km) away from Hartford, 89 miles (143 km) away from Boston, 90 miles (140 km) from Albany and 140 miles (230 km) from New York City.

According to the United States Census Bureau, the city has a total area of 23.9 square miles (62 km^{2}), of which 22.9 square miles (59 km^{2}) is land and 1.0 square mile (2.6 km^{2}) (4.31%) is water. The Chicopee River flows through the southern part of the city, emptying into the Connecticut River. Many ponds, lakes, and streams are part of the Chicopee River or Connecticut River watersheds.

=== Neighborhoods ===
==== Willimansett ====
In 1641, Willian Pynchon expanded his 1636 holdings by buying the land from the Chicopee River north to the Willimansett (Nipmuc for "good berries place" or "place of red earth") Brook. Land sales in Chicopee were recorded in 1659, but apparently no homes were built immediately.

Winthrop McKinstry writes that the sons of Deacon Samuel Chapin appear to be the first home builders. Henry Chapin is believed to have constructed his at Exchange and West streets (lower Chicopee) in 1664, and Japhet Chapin north of what is now known as James Ferry Road (upper Chicopee) in 1673. It is apparent from McKinstry's book that the Chapin family dominated the area north of the Chicopee River for the settlement's first 70 years. Chicopee Street was part of the First Parish in Springfield.

By the 1750s, Quabbin Road (now McKinstry Avenue) allowed the farmers to access the meadows and fields on the plains at the top of the hill. The Chapins used the land in common for grazing livestock and built ice houses near several large ponds. The ponds were drained by several brooks which flowed into the Connecticut River.

At the end of the 19th century, the city voted to build the Willimansett Bridge, connecting Willimansett with Holyoke across the Connecticut River. The results were profound. Willimansett and Aldenville would develop close ties to Holyoke; even postal and telephone service were (and still are) tied to the "Paper City." The legislative act ordering the building of the bridge was passed in 1892. L.L. Johnson reports that the completion of the bridge was grandly celebrated.

By the 20th century, Willimansett village had developed into quintessential Americana with a high percentage of French Canadian inhabitants. In total, Chicopee became four distinct commercial and political sub-divisions, each with its own ethnic makeup representing its own special interests and, much too frequently, in conflict with each other.

Located between Fairview and Willimansett, the Smith Highlands section once had its own school (first and second grades), Holyoke Street Railway bus service from Ingham Street across Irene, Factory, and Prospect streets, and two locally owned markets. The former Robert's Pond swimming area was a popular summer attraction, and the fields where the current Bellamy Junior High School is located were a popular sledding and skiing location winters.

==== Fairview ====
Fairview is the northernmost neighborhood (village) in Chicopee and originally included the lands that are now part of Westover ARB. Primarily agricultural, Fairview was known for its tobacco farms. After 1939, Westover helped to rapidly develop the village into a residential and commercial district. Memorial Drive (Route 33) flows north–south connecting Chicopee Falls with South Hadley.

==== Aldenville ====
On August 18, 1870, Edward Monroe Alden purchased 600 acres of land just east of Willimansett for the sum of $9,000 with the intent to create a "little city on the hill," which would become Aldenville. In 1890, he began laying out streets which he named for family members and divided the land up into 60-by-170 feet lots. French-Canadian factory workers from Chicopee Falls, Cabotville (Chicopee Center), and Holyoke began to build up the community. Sold for a selling price of $150 with $10 down, the first house was bought and built by French-Canadian builder and carpenter Marcellin Croteau.

== Demographics ==
Historical population
Year	Pop.	±%
1850	8,291	—
1860	7,261	−12.4%
1870	9,607	+32.3%
1880	11,286	+17.5%
1890	14,050	+24.5%
1900	19,167	+36.4%
1910	25,401	+32.5%
1920	36,214	+42.6%
1930	43,930	+21.3%
1940	41,664	−5.2%
1950	49,211	+18.1%
1960	61,553	+25.1%
1970	66,676	+8.3%
1980	55,112	−17.3%
1990	56,632	+2.8%
2000	54,653	−3.5%
2010	55,298	+1.2%
2020	55,560	+0.5%
2024*	55,381	−0.3%
* = population estimate. Source: United States census records and Population Estimates Program data. Source: U.S. Decennial Census

=== 2020 census ===
As of the 2020 census, Chicopee had a population of 55,560. The median age was 41.2 years. 19.5% of residents were under the age of 18 and 19.4% of residents were 65 years of age or older. For every 100 females there were 93.6 males, and for every 100 females age 18 and over there were 89.7 males age 18 and over.

100.0% of residents lived in urban areas, while 0.0% lived in rural areas.

There were 24,106 households in Chicopee, of which 25.7% had children under the age of 18 living in them. Of all households, 34.3% were married-couple households, 22.2% were households with a male householder and no spouse or partner present, and 34.3% were households with a female householder and no spouse or partner present. About 34.9% of all households were made up of individuals and 14.9% had someone living alone who was 65 years of age or older.

There were 25,544 housing units, of which 5.6% were vacant. The homeowner vacancy rate was 0.9% and the rental vacancy rate was 5.4%.

Racial composition as of the 2020 census
Race	Number	Percent
White	39,947	71.9%
Black or African American	2,664	4.8%
American Indian and Alaska Native	200	0.4%
Asian	941	1.7%
Native Hawaiian and Other Pacific Islander	43	0.1%
Some other race	5,713	10.3%
Two or more races	6,052	10.9%
Hispanic or Latino (of any race)	13,027	23.4%

=== 2010 census ===
As of the census of 2010, Chicopee was 3.1% Black, 1.6% Asian, 18.5% Hispanic or Latino of any race, 75% White.

=== 2000 census ===
As of the census of 2000, there were 54,653 people, 23,117 households, and 14,147 families residing in the city. The population density was 2,389.7 inhabitants per square mile (922.7/km^{2}). There were 24,424 housing units at an average density of 1,067.9 per square mile (412.3/km^{2}). The racial makeup of the city was 89.82% White, 2.28% African American, 0.20% Native American, 0.87% Asian, 0.10% Pacific Islander, 4.90% from other races, and 1.84% from two or more races. Hispanic or Latino of any race were 8.76% of the population (12.8% Puerto Rican, 0.5% Dominican, 0.4% Mexican, 0.2% Colombian). Chicopee is the second largest municipality in western Massachusetts, after Springfield (defining western Massachusetts as Hampden, Hampshire, Franklin, and Berkshire counties).

Of all households, 26.5% had children under the age of 18 living with them, 42.6% were married couples living together, 14.2% had a female householder with no husband present, and 38.8% were non-families. 32.7% of all households were made up of individuals, and 14.1% had someone living alone who was 65 years of age or older. The average household size was 2.32 and the average family size was 2.96.

In the city, the population was spread out, with 22.6% under the age of 18, 8.5% from 18 to 24, 28.8% from 25 to 44, 22.5% from 45 to 64, and 17.6% who were 65 years of age or older. The median age was 39 years. For every 100 females, there were 90.7 males. For every 100 females age 18 and over, there were 87.1 males.

The median income for a household in the city was $35,672, and the median income for a family was $44,136. Males had a median income of $35,585 versus $25,975 for females. The per capita income for the city was $18,646. About 9.6% of families and 12.3% of the population were below the poverty line, including 19.5% of those under age 18 and 9.3% of those age 65 or over.

== Economy ==
Chicopee is mostly a service economy with a mixture of small, local businesses and national chains. The city is also home to a number of Polish-American food product manufacturers, reflecting the city's history, and include the Chicopee Provision Company, a major producer of Polish sausage kielbasa under the Blue Seal brand, Millie's Pierogi, a producer of those traditional Polish dumplings, and Domin & Sons, the region's largest producer of horseradish, whose largest market was Polish consumers at Easter.

Despite changes in the global economy, Chicopee does remain home to manufacturers including Callaway Golf which produces more than 5 million golfballs a year at its Willimansett production plant. Since 2013, Chicopee has been home to the headquarters of the Chemex Corporation, makers of the Chemex pour-over coffeemaker, which has been produced with the same design since 1941. Chicopee also hosts the Buxton Company, which "designs, manufactures, and markets personal leather goods, travel kits, and gifts collections for men and women." Founded as L.A.W. Novelty Co. in 1898, the firm changed its name to Buxton Co., LLC in 1921.

Chicopee is home to a handful of financial businesses as well including Alden Credit Union, the Polish National Credit Union and Chicopee Savings Bank. Chicopee Savings Bank is run by Chicopee Bancorp, which operates trades as CBNK on the NASDAQ exchange.

The Chicopee River Business Park and Westover Business Park are within the city's boundaries.

== Arts and culture ==
=== Events ===
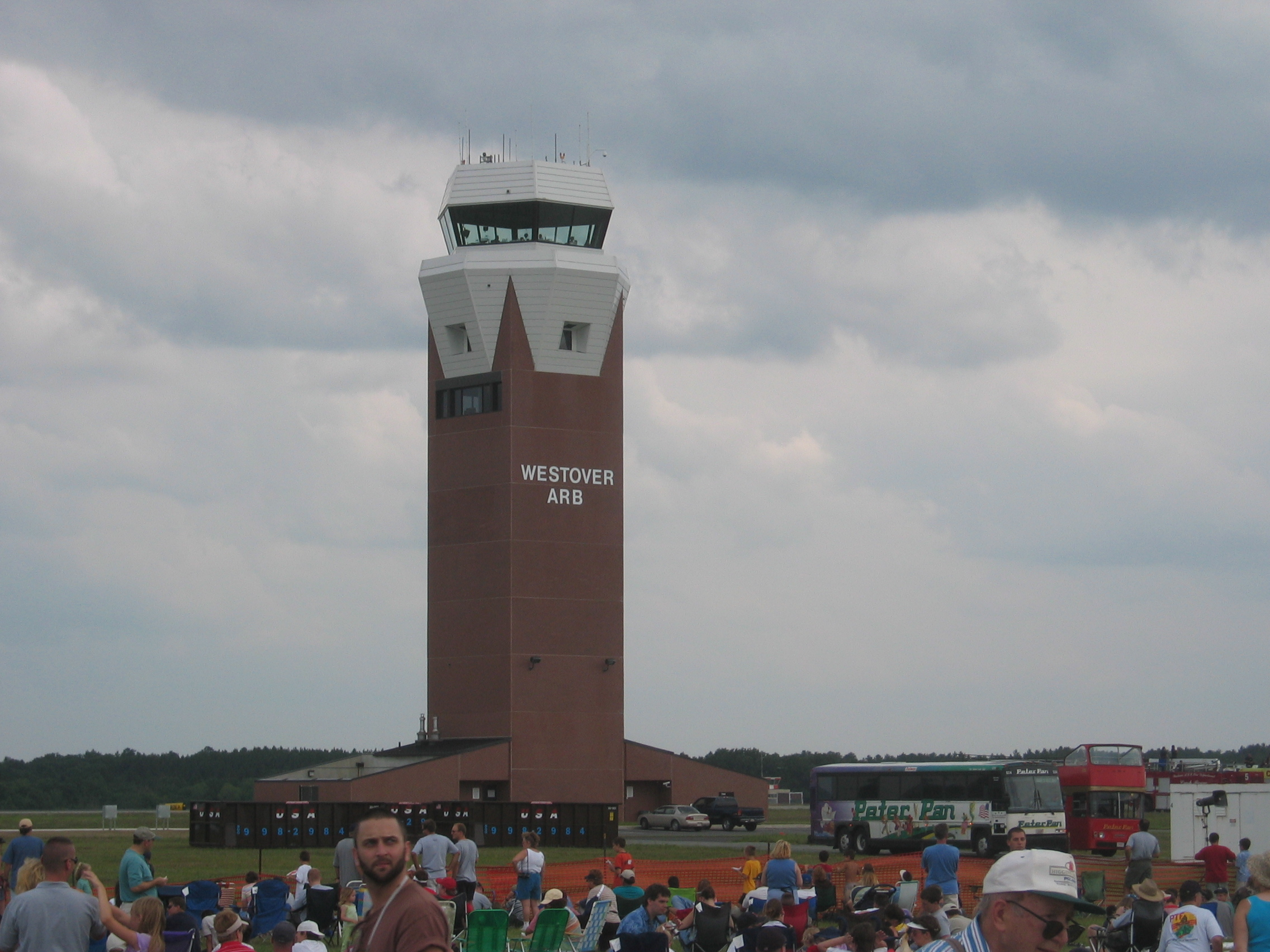
Westover ARB Tower at The Great New England Air Show

- The Great New England Air Show is an annual two-day air show held at Westover Air Reserve Base. The show has featured the USAF Thunderbirds and the US Navy's Blue Angels.
- The World Kielbasa Festival is a four-day fair featuring Polish food, polka dancing, games, and rides.

=== Sites ===
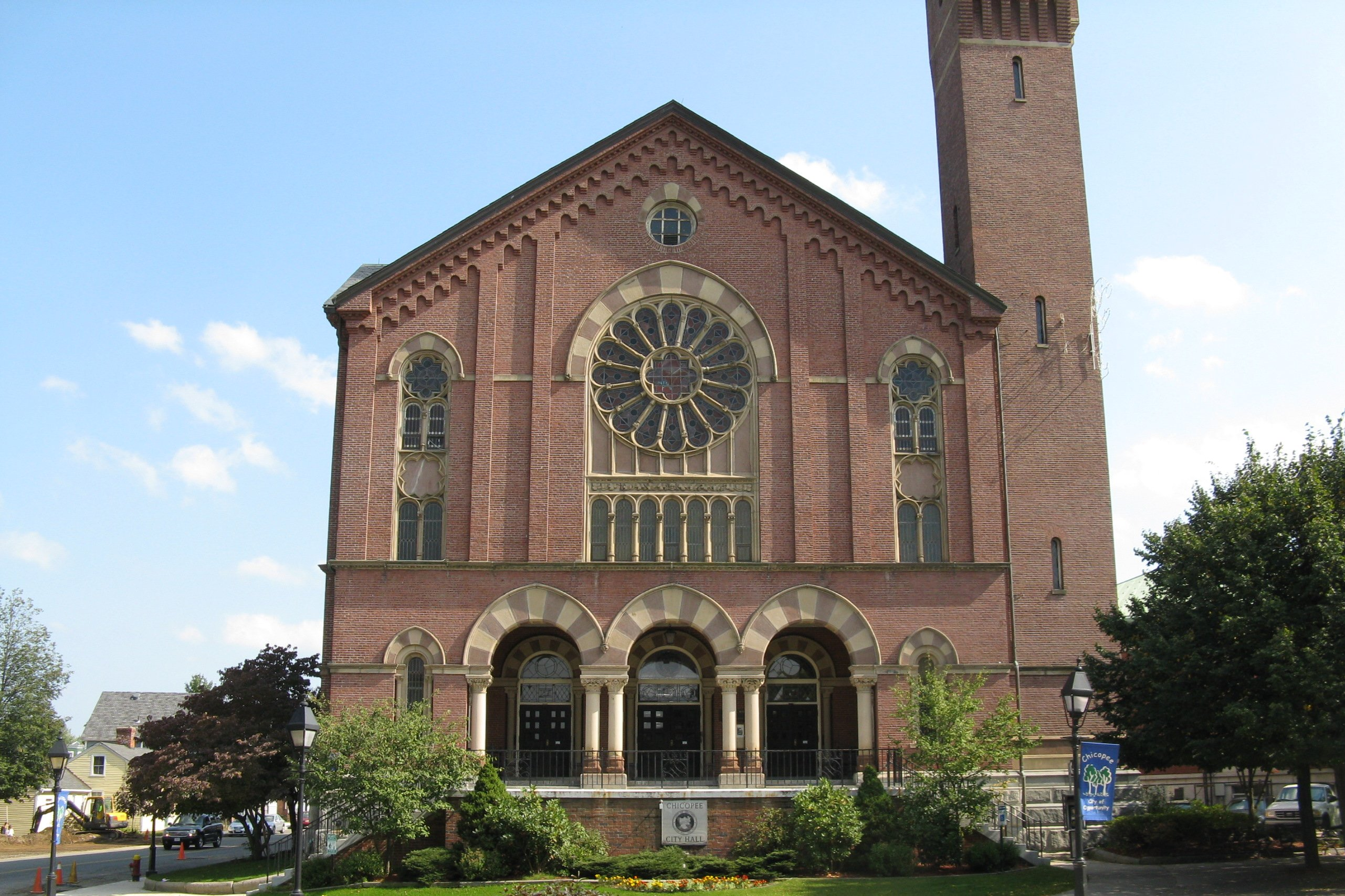
Chicopee City Hall

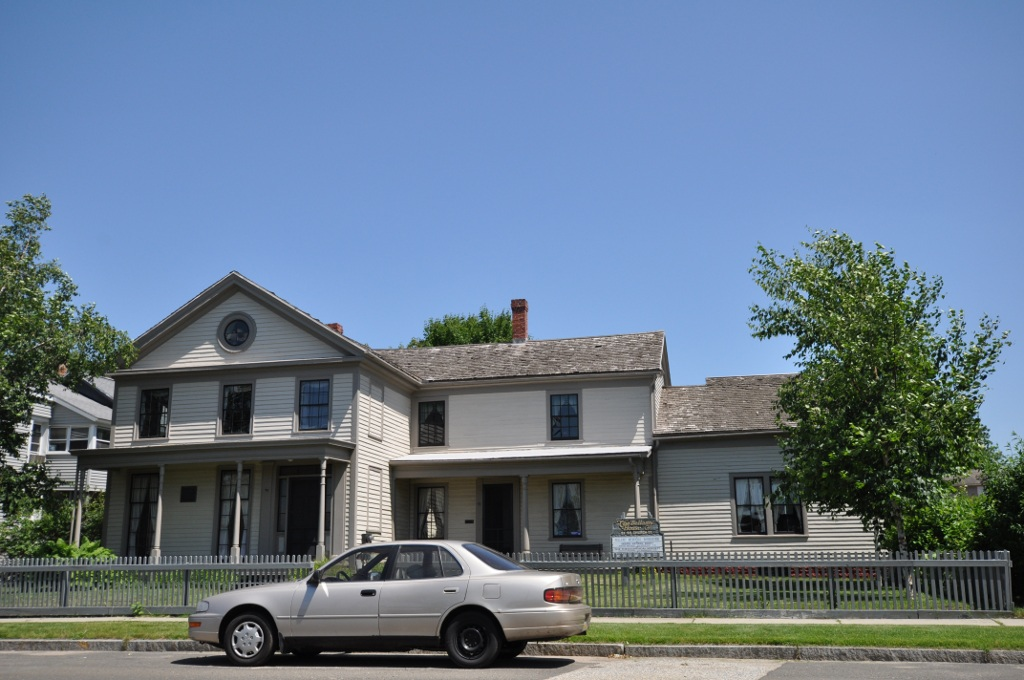
Edward Bellamy House

- The Basilica of Saint Stanislaus, is a 1908 brownstone, church built in the Baroque Revival Style of architecture. Pope John Paul II designated it a Minor Basilica.
- The Cabotville Historic Sycamore Trees, trees that were present when Chicopee became a town in 1848, matured when it became a city in 1890. They were designated Heritage Trees by the Commonwealth of Massachusetts.
- Chicopee City Hall, built in 1871 in the Romanesque style, is listed on the National Register of Historic Places (NRHP).
- Veterans Memorial Plaza, located on Front Street. It is home to monuments dedicated to veterans of the Civil War, World War I, World II, Korean War, Vietnam War, and the War on Terror.
- Edward Bellamy House was built in 1852 and was the home of journalist Edward Bellamy. It is listed on the NRHP and is a National Historic Landmark.
- Emerson Gaylord Mansion, a historic mansion at Elms College, based on French Second Empire style
- The Facemate Tower, a historic tower on the Chicopee River in Chicopee Falls. It used to be a part of the Facemate Industrial Complex.
- The Polish Center of Discovery and Learning, a local history museum.
- The Uniroyal Office Building, a historic building in Chicopee Falls that was part of the Uniroyal Industrial Complex.
- The Willimansett Dike, an elevated, artificial levee in Willimansett, built after the destructive Willimansett flood caused by The Great New England Hurricane of 1938.
- Westover Air Reserve Base, built here in 1940. Originally an Army Air Corps and later Army Air Forces installation known as Westover Field, it became Westover Air Force Base when the Air Force became an independent service in 1947. From 1955 until 1974, it was a Strategic Air Command (SAC) installation. Transferred to the Air Force Reserve in 1974, it was renamed Westover Air Reserve Base and is now the home of the 439th Airlift Wing, flying the C-5 Galaxy aircraft. Westover has one of the largest runways on the east coast, and is the largest Air Force Reserve base in the United States. A joint civil-military facility, it is also home to Westover Metropolitan Airport. Two military-minded youth programs, the Young Marines and the Westover Composite Squadron of the Civil Air Patrol are also located at Westover.

== Parks and recreation ==
- Frank J. Szot Memorial Park, bordering Bemis Pond, contains facilities for baseball, basketball, soccer, and football and picnicking. and football games, as well as war memorials and historic tanks.
- Chicopee Memorial State Park, located in the Burnett Road neighborhood, contains the Cooley Brook Reservoir. The park has been developed into a high use active recreation area.
- The Chicopee Canal Walk is a rail trail that runs along the canal from the Cabotville Historic Sycamore Trees to the former Uniroyal Factory site.
- The Connecticut RiverWalk & Bikeway is a recreational trail that connects the streets and rest stops between Nash Field and the Medina Street boat ramp.

== Government ==
Chicopee has a mayor-council form of government, with a City Council for its legislative branch and a Mayor for its executive branch.

The City Council consists of nine Ward Councilors and four Councilors-at-Large. One Ward Councilor is elected from each ward. The four Councilors-at-Large are elected by all voters in the city. Ward Councilors serve one-year terms, while Councilors-at-Large serve two-year terms. Mayors serve one two-year term. Since 1941, local elections in Chicopee have been non-partisan. From 1890 to 1914, the city had a bicameral legislature consisting of eight wards, with one member of the Board of Aldermen and two members of the Common Council elected from each ward. The city replaced this system by abolishing the Common Council and adding ten aldermen-at-large to the Board of Aldermen. In 2008, the Board of Aldermen approved a home-rule petition to change the legislature's name to the City Council. The name change took effect in 2009.

Chicopee also directly elects the following local offices and bodies:

- A City Clerk elected to one three-year term
- City Collector elected to one three-year term
- A City Treasurer elected to one three-year term
- Three Assessors elected to one three-year term
- A School Committee with two Members-at-Large and nine Ward Members, all elected to one three-year term

=== Voter registration ===
Registered Voters and Party Enrollment
Year	Democratic		Republican		Unenrolled		Total
2004	15,240	44.9%	3,836	11.3%	14,519	42.8%	33,907
2006	14,476	43.5%	3,748	11.3%	14,811	44.5%	33,306
2008	14,751	42.2%	3,759	10.8%	16,162	46.2%	34,959
2010	14,265	41.2%	3677	10.6%	16484	47.6%	34,645
2012	14,171	39.6%	3,786	10.6%	17,578	49.2%	35,761
2014	14,171	39.8%	3,707	10.4%	17,943	50.4%	35,583
2016	13,172	35.5%	4,070	11%	19,322	52.1%	37,110
2018	12,510	33.4%	4,153	11.1%	20,139	53.8%	37,410
2020	12,013	30.8%	4,357	11.2%	21,953	56.4%	38,943
2022	11,196	28%	4,088	10%	23,951	60%	39,816

== Education ==
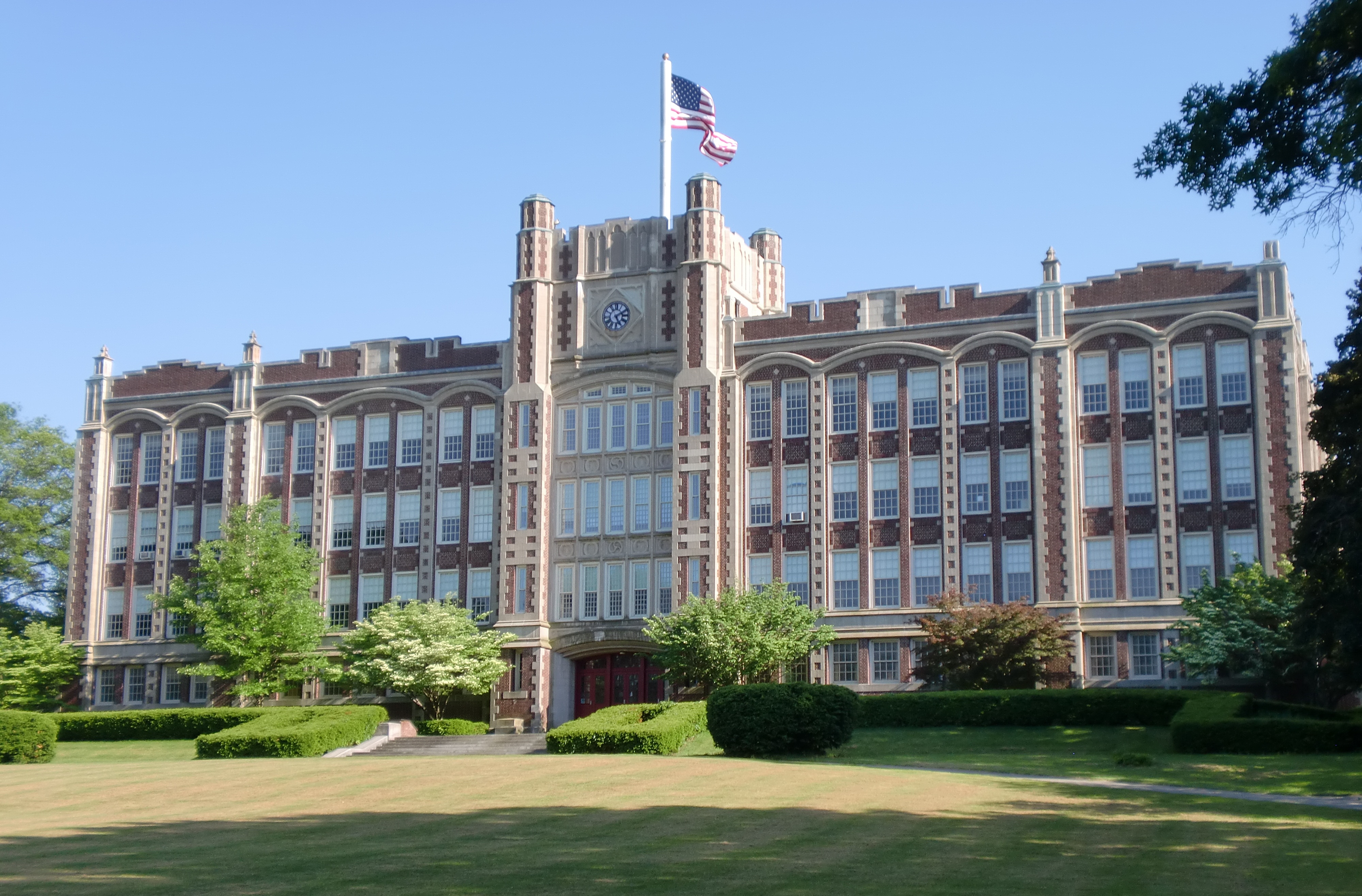
The former Chicopee High School, now the DuPont Memorial Middle School serving grades 6 through 8

=== College of Our Lady of the Elms ===
The College of Our Lady of the Elms is a four-year liberal arts college offering thirty-three academic majors. It was first founded in 1897 as a girls' preparatory academy in Pittsfield, the Academy of Our Lady of the Elms. In 1899, it moved to Chicopee as St. Joseph's Normal College. A charter for the school to operate as a women's liberal arts college was approved in 1928, and the name was changed to the College of Our Lady of the Elms. It began admitting men in 1998.

=== Private elementary ===
Catholic schools operated under the Diocese of Springfield include Saint Joan of Arc School which serves Saint Rose de Lima Church, and Saint Stanislaus School which serves the St. Stanislaus Bishop & Martyr's Parish.

=== Private secondary ===
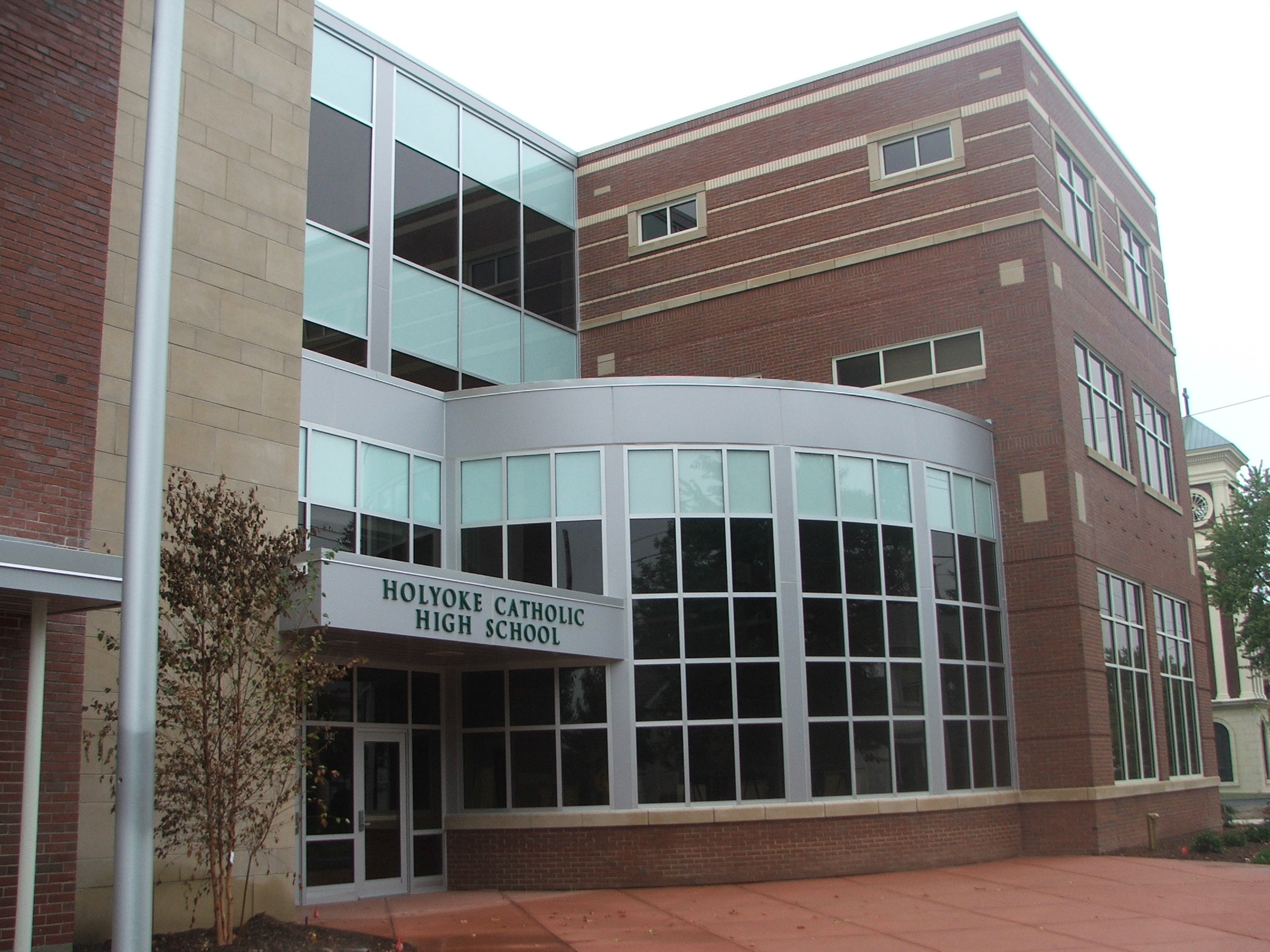
Holyoke Catholic High School

Holyoke Catholic High School was founded in 1963 at the campus of the former Saint Jerome High School in Holyoke. In 2002 it relocated to the campus of Saint Hyacinth Seminary in Granby. It moved to its Holyoke location in September 2008, and 2015 it merged with Cathedral High School to form a new regional Catholic school that was completed in 2016 as Pope Francis High School in Springfield.

== Notable people ==
- Nathan Peabody Ames (1803–1847), American swordsmith and founder of the Ames Manufacturing Company
- Scott Barnes (born 1987), pitcher for Major League Baseball's Cleveland Indians
- Fred Belcher (1881–1951), American race car driver, ran in the inaugural Indianapolis 500
- Edward Bellamy (1850–1898), author, most known for 1888's Looking Backward
- Gail Koziara Boudreaux (born 1960), CEO of Elevance Health
- Lilian Jackson Braun (1913–2011), author, best known for The Cat Who... series of novels
- Rene Charland (1928–2013), racing driver
- Arthur Chapin (1868–1943), former Massachusetts Treasurer and Holyoke mayor
- Teddy Charles (1928–2012), musician
- Charles Duryea (1861–1938) and J. Frank Duryea (1869–1967), the first to build an automobile in the United States
- Damien Fahey (born 1980), television and radio personality, former host of MTV's Total Request Live
- Anthony Fairfax, geodemographer
- Ray Fitzgerald (1904–1977), Major League Baseball player
- Sabina Gadecki (born 1983), actress
- George S. Irving (1922–2016), actor and singer
- Joe Jackson (born 1953), gridiron football player
- Philip Labonte (born 1975), musician, vocalist for All That Remains
- Chelsey Lynn LaRue (born 1992), R&B singer better known as The Bonfyre
- Richard R. Lavigne (1941–2021), defrocked Catholic priest
- Arthur MacArthur Jr. (1845–1912), Army General, father of Douglas MacArthur
- Lucius E. Pinkham (1850–1922), served as the fourth Territorial Governor of Hawaii
- Victoria Principal (born 1950), actress, attended Chicopee Comprehensive High School through her junior year in 1968
- George D. Robinson (1834–1896), former Massachusetts Governor and defense counsel of Lizzie Borden
- Peter Robinson (1874–1947), theater and sideshow performer, appeared in the 1932 film Freaks
- Garry St. Jean (born 1950), former NBA basketball coach for the Sacramento Kings
- Daniel Webster Whittle (1840–1901), 19th-century American gospel song lyricist
- Michael Dean Woodford (born 1955), macroeconomist and monetary theorist at Columbia University

== See also ==
- Cabotville Common Historic District
- Chicopee Falls Dam
- Dwight Manufacturing Company Housing District
- List of mill towns in Massachusetts
- Paulo Freire Social Justice Charter School, a former school
- Polish National Home
- Springfield Street Historic District
- Belcher Lodge
- Valentine School
