= Cabotville Common Historic District =

Historic district in Massachusetts, United States

- U.S. National Register of Historic Places
- U.S. Historic district
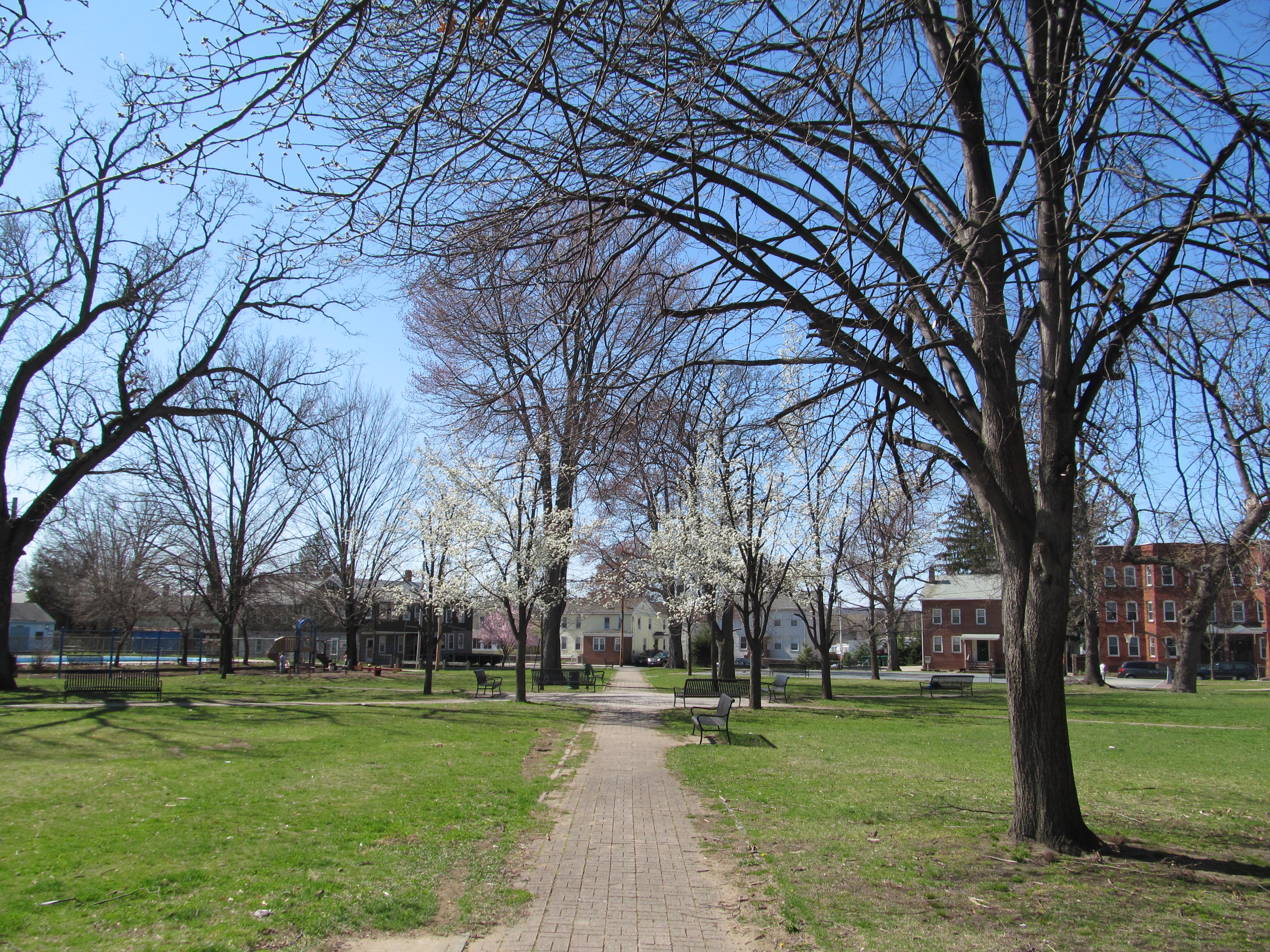
- The Commons

- Location within Massachusetts Location within the United States
- Location: Chicopee, Massachusetts
- Coordinates: 42°8′42″N 72°36′42″W
- Architect: McClallan, Charles; Collins, Michael
- Architectural style: Greek Revival, Italianate
- NRHP reference No.: 99000558
- Added to NRHP: May 28, 1999

The Cabotville Common Historic District is a predominantly residential historic district in Chicopee, Massachusetts. It is centered on the park now called Lucy Wisniowski Park, which was previously known as "The Common", and includes all of the buildings that face the park, as well as a few on immediately adjacent city streets. It was developed in the 1830s and 1840s as an area where mid-level employees of Chicopee's mills and factories lived, between the simpler tenements and boarding houses of the lower classes, and the elite mansions of the proprietors and top-level managers. Most of the building stock in the district was built between 1846 and 1870, and were single family brick or wood-frame Greek Revival houses. The Common, whose original purpose was to provide shared pasturage for area residents, was by the end of this period converted to a park. From the 1870s to the 1890s the housing stock was predominantly multi-family in scale, and exhibited the architectural fashions of the time: Italianate, Second Empire, and Victorian. Thereafter development was limited due to a lack of available land, and only a few brick apartment houses were built between 1890 and 1915.

Since that time there have been only modest changes to the neighborhood. A school was torn down, and was replaced by a wading pool and bath house. Buildings have been altered and added, and a few have been moved. The district was listed on the National Register of Historic Places in 1989.

== See also ==
- National Register of Historic Places listings in Hampden County, Massachusetts
- Dwight Manufacturing Company Housing District
- Springfield Street Historic District
- List of mill towns in Massachusetts
