= Chicopee Public Library =

Coordinates: 42.1486°N 72.6007°W

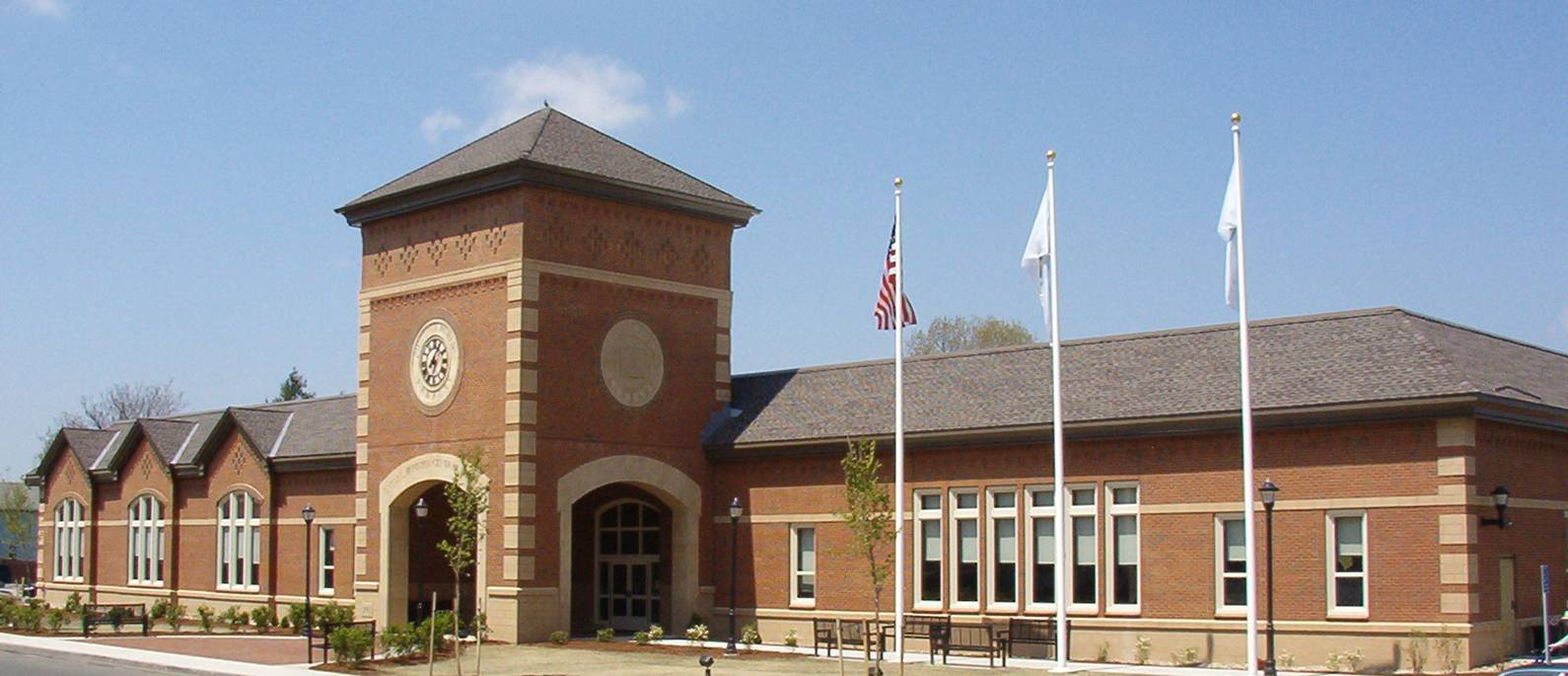
- Location: 449 Front Street, Chicopee, Massachusetts 01013
- Established: 1853, current building 2004

Other information
- Director: Laura Bovee
- Employees: 35
- Website: chicopeepubliclibrary.org

The Chicopee Public Library is the public library for the city of Chicopee, Massachusetts, and shares resources as a member of the Central and Western Massachusetts Automated Resource Sharing (CW MARS) library network. The library owns approximately 109,000 books according to the 2005 IMLS Public Library Report. In addition, they have 4,200 media items and send and receive over 35,000 interlibrary loan requests. In the fiscal year 2008, the city of Chicopee spent 1.1% of its budget ($1,401,141) on its public library, around $25 per person.

== History ==
In 1851, Massachusetts towns and cities were legally authorized to designate funds for libraries. On March 11, 1853, an article was issued "to see if the town will take measures to establish and maintain a public library for the use of the inhabitants of the town and appropriate money therefore, as petitioned for by John Wells and others". The town accepted the article, establishing the first free public library in the Western part of the state. In 1853, 900 books were donated to the city by the Cabot Institute, a literary and social club of at least 150 members, including D.K. Pearson, a local doctor who also donated money to Mount Holyoke College for the building of Pearson's dormitory, and John Chase, who planned and built the dams to power the mills in Chicopee.

In 1863 library duties were performed by the town clerks, among them J.R. Childs, William L. Bemis and Lester Dickinson. In 1864 the Town of Chicopee voted to "put [the duties of the library] in the hands of a library committee and such remained the official designation of the officers until acceptance of the present charter". John Wells (1864–1875), Edwin O. Carter (1864-1800) and Simon G. Southworth were among the first committee of the library. From 1857 to 1864, George V. Wheelock was the elected librarian of the library. The first library catalogue was printed in 1859, with a supplement issued in 1866. In 1872 the library moved Cabot Hall to City Hall. A second catalogue was printed in 1875.

In 1879 the library committee began sending books to a second branch of the library in Union Hall, Chicopee Falls, where Miss Gorton acted a librarian for the salary of twenty cents per week. In 1884 the library received US$500 to pay for the expansion of the Chicopee Falls branch into a room in Bray's building. The Women's Christian Temperance Union donated approximately 300 books to Chicopee Falls, and additional books were donated by Chicopee Falls residents including Bilad B. Belcher. The Chicopee Falls branch continued to grow until it occupied a room in the Wildes Hotel, a store at the corner of Market and Church Streets, and then the basement of the George S. Taylor School.

In 1879 a reading room was opened in the evenings and used by the library. The reading book was a private subscription run by J.W. Cumnock, Rev. I. F. Porter, George A. Denison, A. F. Gaylord and William W. McClench. In May 1884, the townspeople of Chicopee voted to make the library free. Until that point, patrons had been charged an annual fee of fifty cents on the grounds that "theoretically people are more appreciative of privileges if it costs something". In 1888 the library outgrew its space in City Hall, and the library trustees issued a statement saying "we feel justified in calling upon our public spirited citizens to unite and erect a public library building from private funds". In 1890 Chicopee became a city and the rooms occupied by the library were needed for meetings of the city council. As a result, the building next to the library, which was the home of Jerome Wells, the first president of Chicopee Savings Bank (then Cabot Bank), was purchased and the library housed within. In 1899 an addition was made to the building which greatly enlarged the storage capacity.

In 1898 a branch was opened in Willimansett. However, this branch was not as extensively used as the Chicopee Falls branch and the Trustees report of 1913 highlights the low usage. In 1906 the Trustees transferred 1,000 books to the Chicopee Falls branch and 500 to the Willimansett branch, and a card catalogue was completed in the same year. 1910 saw another branch established in Fairview.

In 1907 Mrs. Spaulding, the wife of Justin Spaulding, founder of Spaulding, left US$20,000 in her will to the city for the construction of a new library. The plans for the new building in Market Square were drawn up by Kirkham & Parlet and the construction was completed by Denis Murphy and Patrick Rourke. The new library on the Market Square site was dedicated on May 13, 1913. The 1913 Trustees report stated that "the trustees hope in the near future to enlarge the usefulness of the library by keeping the main building open every day from nine o'clock in the forenoon to nine o'clock in the evening and a part of a Sunday afternoon".

== The library today ==
Over time, the building built with the donations from Spaulding and others became too small as the population and the collection grew, and the once state-of-the-art facilities could not accommodate the technological needs of the new century. In response, planning began for a new public library building to meet the needs of the large community and the new century. On March 20, 2007, the Chicopee Public Library building in Market Square was closed to shift the primary location to a then secondary library opened at 449 Front Street on May 22, 2004, during National Library Week. The formal dedication was held on May 21, 2004; Mayor Richard R. Goyette and Lt. Gov. Kerry Healey addressed state legislators, trustees, friends of the library, supporters and regional library commissioners. Other speakers included John Krzeminski Jr, a representative of the Partyka family, who donated US$500,000 in the name of Emily Partyka to the "Raise the Roof" campaign for a new library.

The new US$9.3 million Front Street location houses the collection, now totalling over 100,000 items, and the 34,000-square-foot (3,200 m^{2}) facility also provides room for the collection to grow. The library has two levels with a local history room, as well as a quiet study room, a computer lab for classes, and a community room that can seat over 150 people. It is handicap accessible and has increased parking space compared to the previous building. The library is open 9am-9pm Monday-Thursday, 9-5pm Friday, and is only closed weekends during the summer. The trustees are the managers of the library according to the current charter.

Library services include: interlibrary loan with the whole of Massachusetts; lending of museum passes, as well as DVDs, Playaways, VHS, CDs, books, magazines, and newspapers; virtual reference with Meebo from the Chicopee Library Staff; access to electronic databases; eBooks, eAudiobooks, and eVideos from C/W MARS; and computer skills and programming classes for adults, children, and young adults.
