= Valentine School (Chicopee, Massachusetts) =

- U.S. National Register of Historic Places
- U.S. Historic district – Contributing property
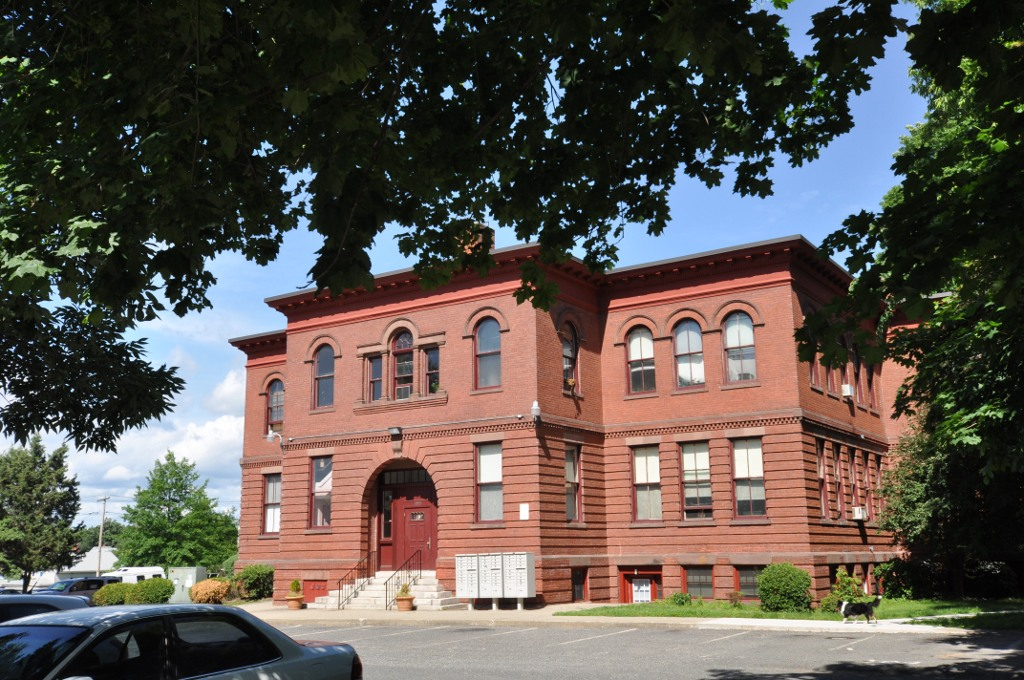

- Location within Massachusetts Location within the United States
- Location: Grape and Elm Sts., Chicopee, Massachusetts
- Coordinates: 42°8′46″N 72°36′12″W
- Area: 2 acres (0.81 ha)
- Built: 1898
- Architect: George P. B. Alderman
- Architectural style: Renaissance
- Part of: Springfield Street Historic District (ID90002217)
- NRHP reference No.: 83000774

Significant dates
- Added to NRHP: September 16, 1983
- Designated CP: January 25, 1991

The Valentine School is a historic school at Grape and Elm Streets in Chicopee, Massachusetts. Built in 1898 to a design by George P. B. Alderman, it is a prominent local eхample of Renaissance Revival architecture. It was individually listed on the National Register of Historic Places in 1983, and included as part of the Springfield Street Historic District in 1991. The building has been converted to residential use.

== Description and history ==
The former Valentine School is located a short way east of downtown Chicopee, at the eastern corner of Grape and Elm Streets. It is a two-story masonry structure, built out of red brick with sandstone trim. Its front, facing Elm Street, consists of a series of stepped projections. Its ground floor is laid in courses that are periodically recessed, giving a rusticated appearance, and is topped by a band of brick corbelling. Windows on that level are set in rectangular openings, with stone sills and lintels. The second floor windows are set in round-arch openings with surrounding sandstone arches. The main entrance is at the center of the facade, recessed with stairs under a large round-arch opening, with a Palladian window on the second floor above. The facade is crowned by a metal cornice with scroll modillions.

The school was built in 1898–99 to a design by George P. B. Alderman, a regionally prominent architect from Holyoke. It was connected by a tunnel to the Robinson Public School on the same lot, which was demolished in the 1950s. It served as a public school until the 1980s, and has since been converted into apartments, with additional apartment blocks added at one corner of the property.

== See also ==
- National Register of Historic Places listings in Hampden County, Massachusetts
