= Paulo Freire Social Justice Charter School =

High school in Massachusetts, United States

Coordinates: 42.1459°N 72.605°W

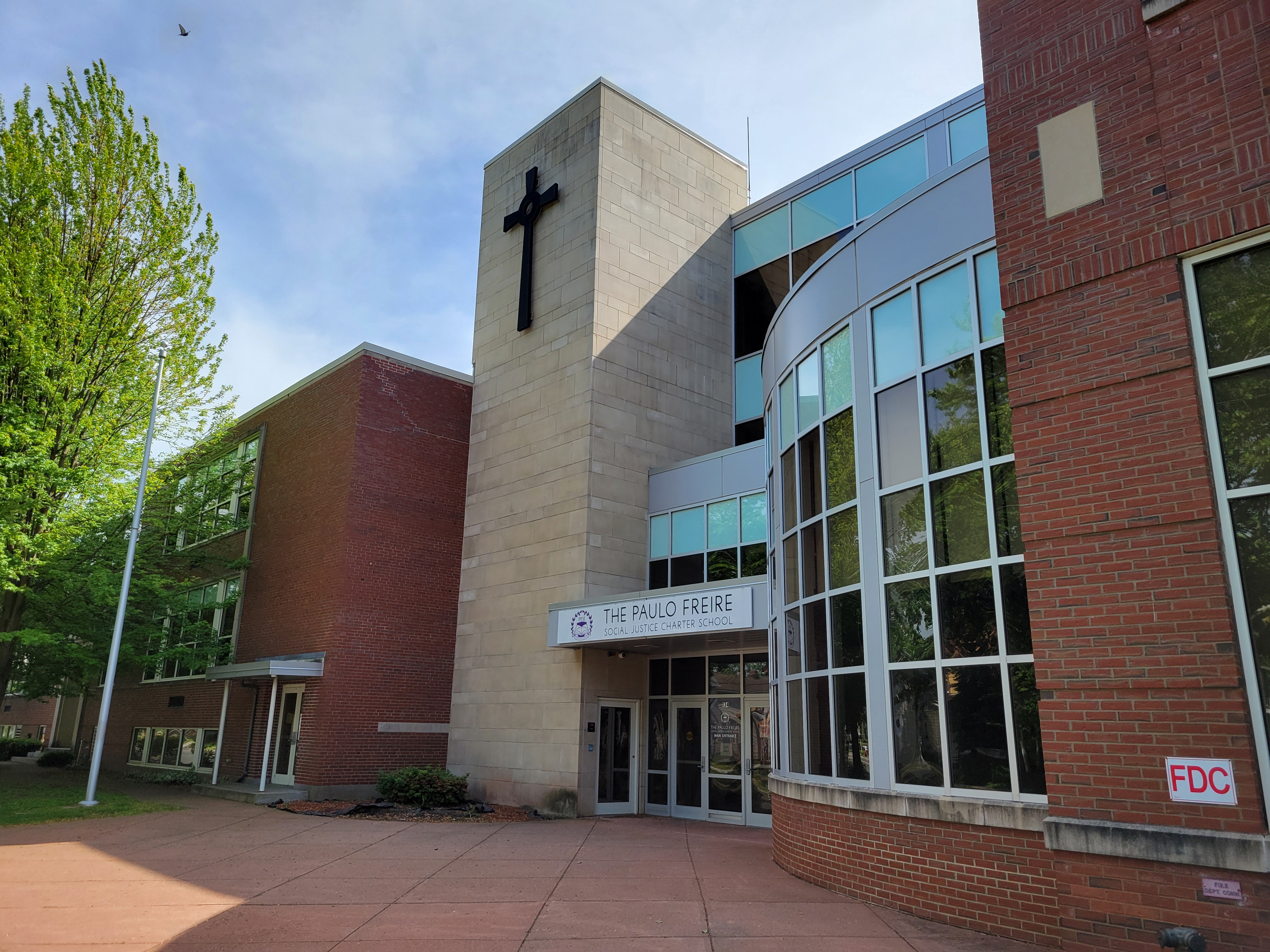
- Paulo Freire Social Justice Charter School
- Chicopee, MA United States

Information
- Type: Charter school
- Established: 2013
- Closed: 1 July 2023
- Color
- Mascot: Panthers

Paulo Freire Social Justice Charter School was a public charter high school in Chicopee and Holyoke, Massachusetts. It was originally located in Holyoke, Massachusetts, but relocated to its Chicopee 2019. It primarily served students in nearby towns such as; Holyoke, Chicopee, Springfield, West Springfield, Westfield, and South Hadley. It closed in the summer of 2023 after the Massachusetts Board of Education declined to renew its charter due to well-below average test scores and insufficient enrollment.

== History ==
In February 2012, the Massachusetts' Board of Elementary and Secondary Education announced Paulo Freire Social Justice Charter School was one of four schools that was granted permission to operate and allowed the naming after Freire. The school opened in September 2013. The school first started out in Holyoke, Massachusetts from its founding until the end of the 2018–19 school year. Moving a town over to the former Pope Francis Catholic High School building in Chicopee in 2019. It is named after the leftist Brazilian educator Paulo Freire.

In 2021, the school was accused of union-busting by teachers and the United Auto Workers local 2322, which had represented teachers and staff at the school since 2020. The school had recently non-renewed the contracts of half of its staff.

In January 2023, the Massachusetts Board of Education voted to accept the school's charter and the school is set to close following the conclusion of the 2022-23 school year. MA BOE chairman said of the school “The school has been unable to attract enrollment sufficient to maintain financial viability and has faced other challenges.”

== Athletics ==
=== Boys' Basketball ===
- 1x Western Mass Class C; 2022

=== Girls' volleyball ===
The program has won 2 Western Mass Championships and won one State Championship.

- 2x Western Mass Class B; 2021, 2022
- 1x MIAA Div. 5; 2021
