= The Bonfyre =

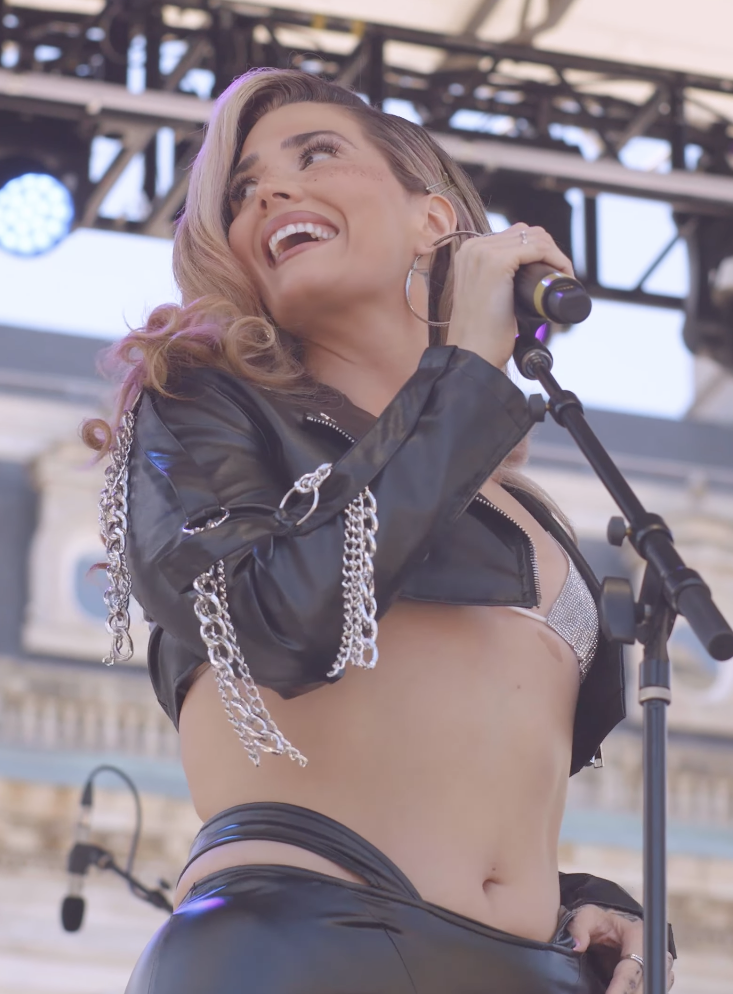
- The Bonfyre performing in 2022

Background information
- Born: Chelsey Lynn LaRue; October 7, 1992 (age 34)
- Origin: Chicopee, Massachusetts
- Genres: R&B; pop
- Occupations: Singer; actress
- Years active: 2017–present
- Labels: Empowered Music Group (current); Hitco Entertainment (former)

Chelsey Lynn LaRue (born October 7, 1992), known professionally as The Bonfyre, is an American singer and songwriter. She signed to LA Reid's label Hitco Entertainment to release her first EP, Ready To Love in 2018 and her follow up EP, Love, Lust & Letdowns: Chapter 1 in 2020. Bonfyre would then part ways with Hitco Entertainment in favor of Empowered Music Group (EMG) where she would release her comeback single, No Sleep, in 2025.

== Early life and education ==
She was raised in Chicopee, Massachusetts, by her stepfather, who is of Samoan descent. She eventually grew very close with her aunt and uncle who had a Polynesian show at the now closed Hu Ke Lau restaurant in Chicopee.

== Career ==
She signed with Hitco Music in March 2018. On December 13, Bonfyre released a new music video for "Automatic" exclusively on Billboard. Her debut single "Automatic" hit #1 on the Adult R&B Airplay Charts. In March 2019, Bonfyre was named as one of three up-and-coming R&B artists to debut on Billboard's Emerging Artists chart.

In August 2019, Fantasia had announced Bonfyre would be a part of her "Sketchbook" tour.

After embarking on a five-year hiatus from releasing music, The Bonfyre returned with her record "No Sleep". under her new label Empowered Music Group.

== Discography ==
=== Studio albums ===
List of studio albums with selected details
Title	Details
Ready to Love	Released: August 17, 2018 (US); Label: Hitco Entertainment; Formats: Digital download
Love, Lust & Let Downs: Chapter One	Released: May 1, 2020 (US); Label: Hitco Entertainment; Formats: Digital download

=== Extended plays ===
List of extended plays, with details
Title	Details
BONFYRE EP	Released: February 2024; Label: Format: Digital download

=== Singles ===
==== As lead artist ====
List of singles as lead artist, with selected chart positions and certifications, showing year released and album name
Title	Year	Peak chart positions				Certifications	Album
Title	Year	US Bub.	US R&B /HH	US R&B	NZ Hot	Certifications	Album
"Automatic"	2018	—	—	—	—	—	Ready to Love
"U Say" (featuring 6lack)	2019	—	—	—	—	—	Love, Lust & Let Downs: Chapter One
"U Remind Me" (featuring Wale)	2020	—	—	—	—	—	Love, Lust & Let Downs: Chapter One
"Mercy Mercy Me" (with Masego)	2020	—	—	—	—	—	Stand Up: A Global Citizen Prize Project
"No Sleep"	2025	—	—	—	—	—	—
"—" denotes a recording that did not chart or was not released in that territory.

==== As featured artist ====
List of singles as lead artist, with selected chart positions and certifications, showing year released and album name
Title	Year	Peak chart positions	Certifications	Album
Title	Year	US Bub.	Certifications	Album
"Cascade" (Stokley featuring The Bonfyre)	2021	—	—	Sankofa

== Awards and nominations ==
Award	Year	Category	Nominee(s)	Result	Ref.
iHeartRadio Music Awards	2020	Best New R&B Artist	Herself	Nominated	
