= Dwight Manufacturing Company Housing District =

Historic district in Massachusetts, United States

- U.S. National Register of Historic Places
- U.S. Historic district
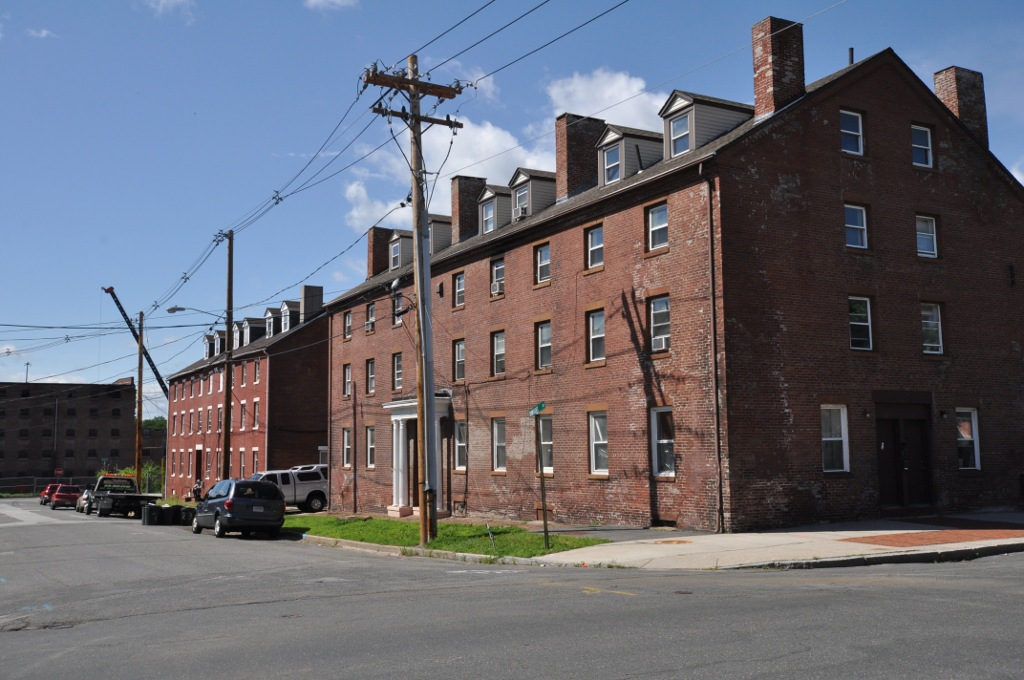

- Location within Massachusetts Location within the United States
- Location: Chicopee, Massachusetts
- Coordinates: 42°8′48″N 72°36′44″W
- Area: 7 acres (2.8 ha)
- Built: 1832
- Architect: McClallan, Charles
- Architectural style: Greek Revival, Stick/Eastlake
- NRHP reference No.: 77000173
- Added to NRHP: June 3, 1977

The Dwight Manufacturing Company Housing District is a residential historic district in Chicopee, Massachusetts. Roughly bounded by Front, Depot, Dwight, Exchange, and Chestnut Streets, it encompasses a variety of housing built for mill workers at Chicopee's mills during the 19th century. This cluster is one of few remnants of such housing, which was built on a larger scale now diminished by urban renewal. The district was listed on the National Register of Historic Places in 1977.

== Description and history ==
Chicopee's major industrial history began in 1832, when the Chicopee River was dammed, with textile mills beginning to operate soon afterward. Funded largely by investors from Boston, The Boston Associates, including early investors in mills at Lowell, a number of mills were built between 1832 and 1841. Four separate firms were consolidated into the Dwight Manufacturing Company in 1856; Edmund Dwight, for whom it was named, was from a prominent local family who was a lawyer and businessman in Boston. Early mill owners built boarding houses to attract single young women from area farms, offering concerned parents the security of a supervised living environment for their daughters. One typical boarding house is the brick building at 2-6-10 Dwight Street, which was built about 1832 for the Springfield Canal Company and sold to the Dwight Company in 1844. Later housing catered more toward immigrant families, who eventually came to dominate mill employment. A good example of this type is at 15-17 Chestnut Street, a modest two-story brick building with Greek Revival style.

The district is composed of buildings on or near the city block formed by Front, Depot, Dwight, Exchange, and Chestnut Streets, and includes buildings dating from 1830 to the 1870s. These buildings were owned by the mills until they shutdown in 1927, after which they were sold into private hands. These types of buildings were built in large numbers in the areas near the mills, but many have been demolished for subsequent development or significantly altered.

== See also ==
- National Register of Historic Places listings in Hampden County, Massachusetts
- Cabotville Common Historic District
- Springfield Street Historic District
- List of mill towns in Massachusetts
