= Chicopee Memorial State Park =

State park in Hampden County, Massachusetts

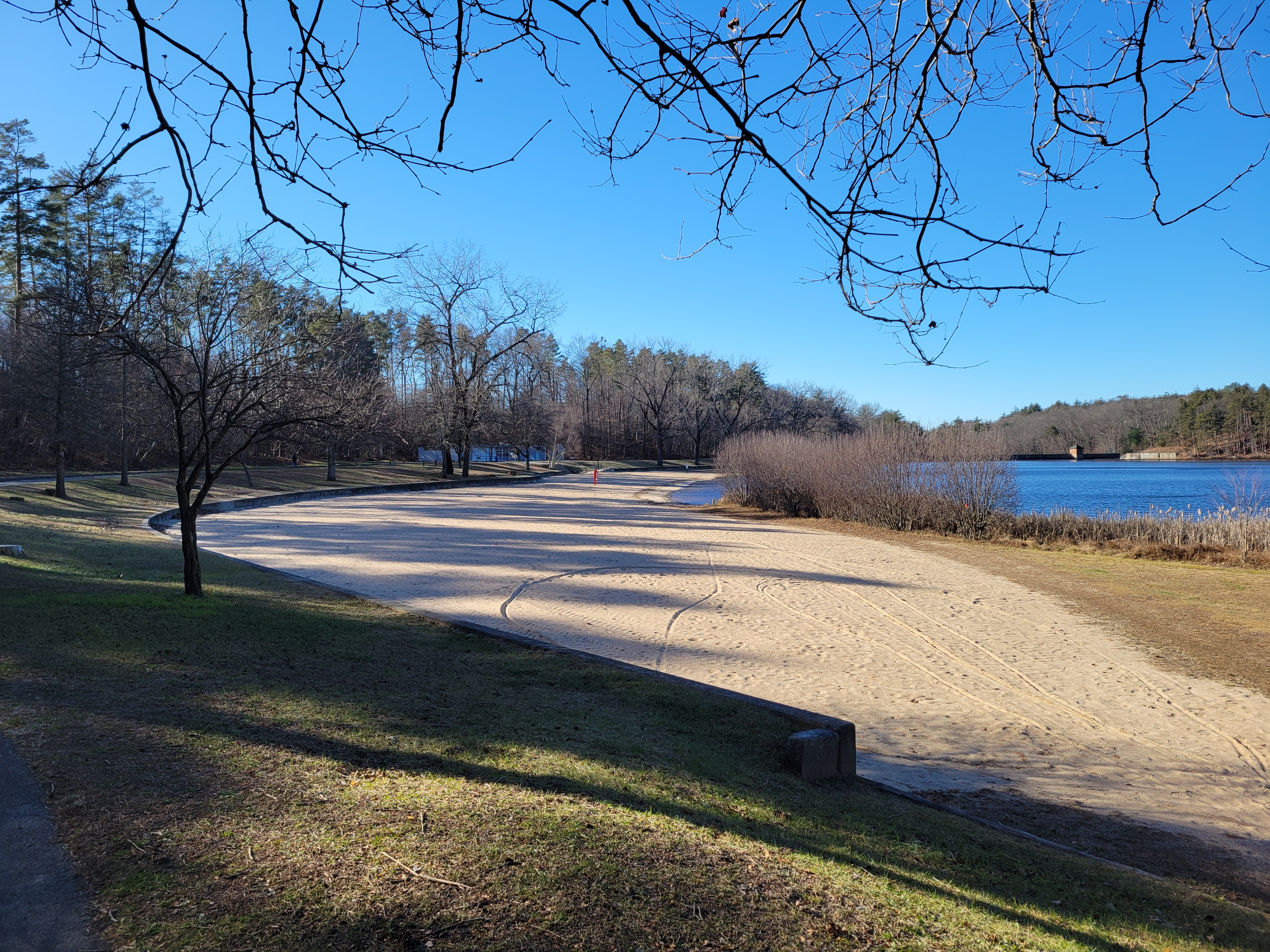
- Chicopee Reservoir beach

- Location within Massachusetts Location within the United States
- Interactive map of Chicopee Memorial State Park
- Location: Chicopee, Massachusetts, United States
- Coordinates: 42°10′14″N 72°33′05″W
- Area: 562 acres (227 ha)
- Elevation: 167 ft (51 m)
- Administrator: Massachusetts Department of Conservation and Recreation
- Website: Official website

Chicopee Memorial State Park is a public recreation area covering 562 acres (227 ha) in the Burnett Road neighborhood of the city of Chicopee, Massachusetts. The state park is located directly southeast of Westover Air Reserve Base, which is visible from some parts of the park. It is managed by the Department of Conservation and Recreation.

== History ==
Once known as the Cooley Brook Reservoir and Watershed, the park was originally the site of reservoirs built in 1896, 1912 and 1926 to provide water for the city of Chicopee. The Civilian Conservation Corps worked in the watershed from 1935 to 1937, adding riprap to the reservoir, planting trees, and creating roads, trails, and pedestrian bridges among other improvements. The state took charge of the site in the 1960s, adding recreational and administrative features.

== Activities and amenities ==
The park has trails for walking, mountain biking, and cross-country skiing. The former 25-acre (10 ha) reservoir pond is used for swimming and restricted fishing. Other facilities include picnic areas, restrooms, and a bathhouse.

The city's high schools use park trails for cross-country meets. The park is District Headquarters for the Massachusetts Bureau of Forest Fire Control, District 11.
