= Anthony Fairfax =

Anthony "Tony" Fairfax is a Hampton, Virginia-based Geodemographic Consultant and President/CEO of CensusChannel LLC. Since the earlier nineties Fairfax has provided demographic and mapping services with a concentration on census data and redistricting.

== Early life and education ==
Fairfax was born in Chicopee Falls, Massachusetts, to Helen and Nathaniel Fairfax. His father was in the US Air Force, which compelled his family to move several times during his early childhood life. They moved from Massachusetts to Washington D.C to Okinawa, Japan all before finally residing in Hampton, Virginia. After Fairfax graduated from high school (Tabb High in York County, VA), he matriculated to Virginia Tech and received his undergraduate degree in Electrical Engineering. Fairfax furthered his education by receiving an advanced degree of a Masters of Geospatial Information Science and Technology (MGIST) from NC State University.

== Redistricting career ==
During his consulting career, Fairfax consulted for numerous non-profit and public sector organizations including the Congressional Black Caucus (CBC) Institute, the Louisiana Legislative Black Caucus (LLBC). and Southern Coalition for Social Justice (SCSJ). During the 2010 round of redistricting, Fairfax provided affidavits, depositions and expert testimonies for several court cases including, Moore v. State of Tennessee, the North Carolina Supreme Court Case NC NAACP v. State of North Carolina, and the Texas federal redistricting court case, Perez v. Perry. An aspect of Fairfax's consulting services involved training, specifically redistricting and geographic information systems (GIS). Fairfax training services encompassed national organizations such as the Congressional Black Caucus Institute and the Young Elected Officials (YEO) and educational institutions such as Elizabeth City State University, Howard University, and Norfolk State University.

== Redistricting cases ==
Fairfax provided expert testimony, deposition and expert report as an expert witness on redistricting cases in more than cases for the various civil rights groups such as the North Carolina NAACP, Texas NAACP, and Southern Coalition for Social Justice. He provided expert reports and/or testimony including the following cases:

• Perez v. Abbott (US Federal District Court) – His analysis focused on certain characteristics, including population deviation, compactness, political subdivision splits and communities of interest for congressional and house plans. Additional analysis was performed on demographic projections for certain congressional and state house districts.

• The City of Greensboro v The Guilford County Board of Elections (US Federal District Court) - Fairfax provided expert testimony, deposition and expert report included several districts plans for the city council of Greensboro, NC, and analyzed certain characteristics, including population deviation, political subdivision splits, partisan performance, and incumbent effect analysis.

• Wright v North Carolina (US Federal District Court) – Fairfax gave expert testimony and report included analysis of population deviation, compactness, partisan impact and incumbent residences for county commission and school board plans.

• ADC v Alabama (US Federal District Court) - Fairfax produced senate and house redistricting plans. Also, he provided deposition on the creation of the plan. Also, generated a series of thematic maps depicting areas added from the previous plan to the enacted plan, displaying concentrations of African American voters that were added to the enacted plan.

• Perez v. Perry (US Federal District Court) – Fairfax's analysis focused on certain characteristics, including population deviation, compactness, political subdivision splits and communities of interest for congressional and house plans. Additional analysis was performed reviewing demographic aspects of several congressional and state house districts.

• NC NAACP v. State of North Carolina (North Carolina Supreme Court Case) – Fairfax developed an expert report and gave a deposition that centered on compactness ratios on NC house and senate districts.

== First Publication ==
In 2004, Fairfax published his first book called A Step-by-Step Guide to Using Census 2000 Data. He used the book in workshops to train various faculty and professionals on the use of Census 2000 data.

== The Presidential Trend ==
In 2013, Fairfax published The Presidential Trend. Both books discussed and put forth a theory on why the popular vote for the Democratic candidate for president increased in an almost perfect straight or linear line from 1972 to 2000, excluding the 1976 election. Fairfax believes he discovered this voting pattern and thus he named this phenomenon, The Presidential Trend. Previously, using analysis from his book's theory, Fairfax correctly predicted the popular vote win of Barack Obama in 2008 in a press release prior to the election. His prediction was that Obama would win with 51.1% (+/- 2.7) of the popular vote. Obama won with 52.86% of the popular vote. In 2012, Fairfax's analysis on the state of Virginia that was depicted in his book was included in an award-winning special television segment entitled Battleground Virginia. Fairfax has been interviewed numerous times on his theory, including radio shows such as: Good Books Radio, Jeff Schechtman's Specific Gravity, Dr. Alvin Jones and others.

== Personal life ==
He is married to Dr. Colita Nichols Fairfax, an Associate Professor in the School of Social Work at Norfolk State University and author of Hampton, Virginia (Black American Series). The two have two daughters, Layla and Natalie.
