= Chicopee (disambiguation) =

Chicopee is a city in Massachusetts, United States.

Chicopee may also refer to:

== Place names ==
In the United States:

- Chicopee, Georgia, a village that is part of the city of Gainesville
- Chicopee, Kansas
- Chicopee River, Massachusetts
  - Chicopee Valley Aqueduct
  - Chicopee Falls Dam
- Chicopee, Missouri

== Vessels ==
- USS Chicopee (1863), a Civil War era vessel
- Chicopee class oiler, a modern class of vessels
  - USS Chicopee (AO-34)

== See also ==
- Chicopee Ski Club, Kitchener, Ontario, Canada
