= Ludlow Center Historic District =

Historic district in Massachusetts, United States

- U.S. National Register of Historic Places
- U.S. Historic district
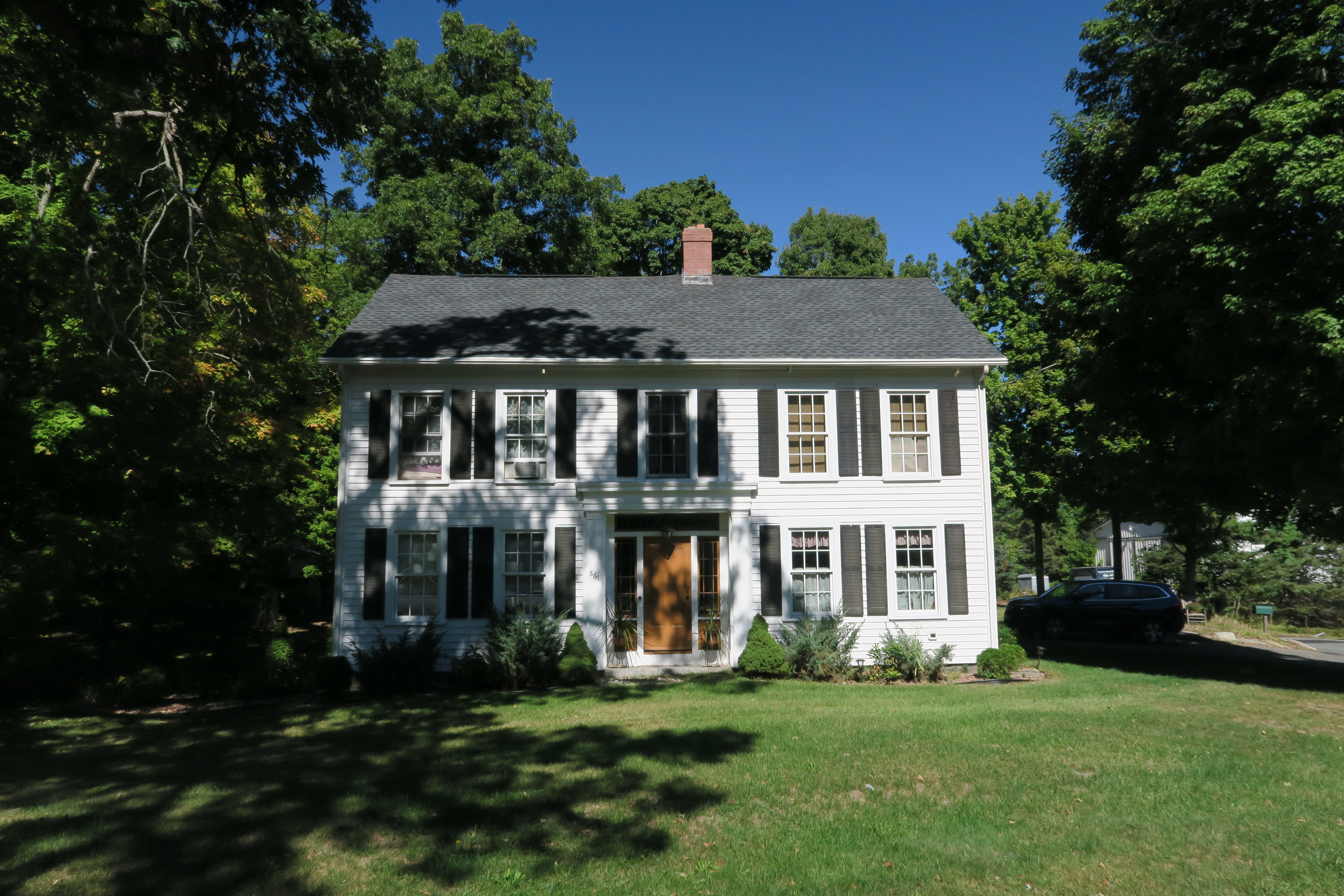
- Increase Sikes House

- Location within Massachusetts Location within the United States
- Location: Along Center, Church and Booth Sts. Ludlow, Massachusetts
- Coordinates: 42°11′31″N 72°27′35″W
- Area: 27 acres (11 ha)
- Built: 1842
- Architectural style: Greek Revival, Italianate, Federal
- NRHP reference No.: 88001999
- Added to NRHP: October 21, 1988

The Ludlow Center Historic District encompasses the historic village center of Ludlow, Massachusetts. Centered on the junction of Center, Church and Booth Streets, it is the site selected as the town center when Ludlow was established in 1774. Its notable structures include the Congregational Church (the third, a Romanesque structure built in 1859), the old town hall (more recently serving as the local grange hall), and a number of farmhouses that date to the first half of the 19th century. The area has remained a center of civic life in the town, even though its economic center moved later in the 19th century to Ludlow Village. The district was listed on the National Register of Historic Places in 1988.

== Description and history ==
Ludlow was part of Springfield upon that community's settlement in 1634, and was separately incorporated in 1774. Prior to the mid-18th century, the area that is now Ludlow was largely undeveloped forest, reaching a population of two to three hundred by the 1770s. Upon incorporation, the town fathers selected a geographically central location for the site of its first meeting house, which was not built until after the American Revolutionary War. A road network, principally Center and Church Streets, was laid out by that time, and a modest village center arose. In the early 19th century, a mill was established on the Chicopee River in the southern reaches of the town, around which Ludlow Village developed as its principal economic center. In 1893, the town meeting was moved to Ludlow Village, and the center has stagnated developmentally since then.

The historic district is centered at the junction of Center, Church, and Booth Streets, and includes just twelve buildings. The First Church Common is a small triangular green at the junction of Church and Center, forming (along with the church itself) the focal point of the district. The original 1783-84 meeting house was originally located on the green, and was moved onto the north side of Church Street in the 1840s.

== See also ==
- National Register of Historic Places listings in Hampden County, Massachusetts
