= Ludlow Village Historic District =

Ludlow Village Historic District may refer to:

- Ludlow Village Historic District (Ludlow, Massachusetts), listed on the NRHP in Massachusetts
- Ludlow Village Historic District (Ludlow, Vermont), listed on the NRHP in Vermont
