= SS Esso Albany =

At least two vessels have been named SS Esso Albany:

- The first SS Esso Albany was built for the Standard Oil Company in 1940 but acquired by the US Navy and renamed USS Sabine (AO-25) instead of entering civilian service.
- The second SS Esso Albany was also built for the Standard Oil Company and launched in 1941. Acquired by the US Navy in early 1942 she served as USS Housatonic (AO-35) during World War II.
