= World War II US Navy dazzle camouflage measures 31, 32 and 33: aircraft carriers =

Dazzle camouflage of warships was adopted by the U.S. Navy during World War II, following research at the Naval Research Laboratory. Dazzle consists in painting obtrusive patterns on vertical surfaces. Unlike some other forms of camouflage, dazzle works not by offering concealment but by making it difficult to estimate a target's range, speed and heading. Each ship's dazzle pattern was unique to make it more difficult for the enemy to recognize different classes of ships. The result was that a profusion of dazzle schemes were tried, and the evidence for their success was at best mixed.

Dazzle camouflage patterns used on aircraft carriers are presented here.

== Colors ==
Typical color combinations
MS-31	MS-31a	MS-32		MS-33		MS-33a	Horizontals
Haze Gray 5-H	Haze Gray 5-H	Light Gray 5-L	Light Gray 5-L	Pale Gray 5-P	Pale Gray 5-P	Light Gray 5-L	Ocean Gray 5-O
Ocean Gray 5-O	Ocean Gray 5-O	Dull Black 82	Ocean Gray 5-O	Haze Gray 5-H	Haze Gray 5-H	Ocean Gray 5-O	Deck Blue 20-B
Dull Black 82	Navy Blue 5-N		Dull Black 82	Navy Blue 5-N	Ocean Gray 5-O		

== Patterns ==
Aircraft carrier designs
Name	Description	Pattern sheet	Photo	Known examples
MS-33/1A	for USS Ranger (CV-4)			Ranger
MS-3_/3A	for Essex (CV-9) class		Hornet	Intrepid (MS-32), Hornet (MS-33), Franklin (MS-32), (Note: Franklin wore 32/6A from commissioning until April 1944 and 32/3A from May until the end of the year. In April–May she carried 3A on her port side and 6A to starboard.) Hancock (MS-32)
MS-32/4A	for Bogue (CVE-9) class		Bogue	Bogue, Card, Core, Croatan, Prince William
MS-32/4A	for Casablanca (CVE-55) class		Mission Bay	Mission Bay, Tripoli, Guadalcanal, Solomons, Kasaan Bay, Fanshaw Bay, Tulagi
MS-33/4Ab	for USS Enterprise (CV-6)			Enterprise
MS-3_/6A	for Essex (CV-9) class		Franklin	Franklin, Bunker Hill
MS-33/7A	for Independence (CVL-22) class		San Jacinto	Princeton, Cowpens, San Jacinto
MS-3_/8A	for Independence (CVL-22) class		Bataan	Independence (MS-33), Bataan (MS-32)
MS-32/9A	for USS Long Island (CVE-1)			Long Island
MS-33/10A	for Essex (CV-9) class		Wasp and Yorktown	Yorktown, Ticonderoga, Wasp, Shangri-La
MS-33/10A	for Sangamon (CVE-26) class			Chenango
MS-33/10A	for Casablanca (CVE-55) class		Petrof Bay	Corregidor, Wake Island, White Plains, Kalinin Bay, Nehenta Bay, Kadashan Bay, Petrof Bay, Shamrock Bay, Sitkoh Bay, Thetis Bay
MS-32/11A	for USS Saratoga (CV-3)			Saratoga
MS-32/12A	for Casablanca (CVE-55) class		Anzio	Casablanca, Anzio, Manila Bay, Kitkun Bay, Steamer Bay, Cape Esperance, Takanis Bay
MS-33/14A	for Casablanca (CVE-55) class		Savo Island	Natoma Bay, Savo Island, Saginaw Bay, Attu
MS-32/15A	for Casablanca (CVE-55) class		St. Lo	St. Lo, Gambier Bay, Marcus Island, Ommaney Bay, Rudyerd Bay, Sargent Bay, Shipley Bay
MS-32/16A	for Casablanca (CVE-55) class		Hollandia	Makassar Strait, Makin Island, Hollandia, Roi
MS-32/16A	for Commencement Bay (CVE-105) class		Commencement Bay	Commencement Bay, Bairoko
MS-32/17A	for Essex (CV-9) class		Bennington	Randolph, Bennington, Bon Homme Richard, Antietam
MS-33/18A	for Casablanca (CVE-55) class		Lunga Point	Hoggatt Bay, Windham Bay, Lunga Point, Bismarck Sea, Salamaua, Bouganville
MS-33/18A	for Commencement Bay (CVE-105) class			Block Island
Adapted designs
MS-33/3D (destroyer)	adapted to Independence (CVL-22) class		Monterey	Belleau Wood, Monterey
MS-33/3D (destroyer)	adapted to Casablanca (CVE-55) class			
MS-32v6/10D (destroyer)	adapted to Essex (CV-9) class			Essex

== See also ==
- World War II ship camouflage measures of the United States Navy
- World War II US Navy dazzle camouflage measures 31, 32 and 33: battleships
- World War II US Navy dazzle camouflage measures 31, 32 and 33: cruisers
- World War II US Navy dazzle camouflage measures 31, 32 and 33: destroyers
