= World War II US Navy dazzle camouflage measures 31, 32 and 33: battleships =

Dazzle camouflage of warships was adopted by the U.S. Navy during World War II, following research at the Naval Research Laboratory. Dazzle consists in painting obtrusive patterns on vertical surfaces. Unlike some other forms of camouflage, dazzle works not by offering concealment but by making it difficult to estimate a target's identity, range, speed and heading. Each ship's dazzle pattern was unique to make it more difficult for the enemy to recognize different classes of ships. The result was that a profusion of dazzle schemes were tried, and the evidence for their success was at best mixed.

Dazzle camouflage patterns used on battleships are presented here.

Measure 31 was the darkest of the three patterns and was intended to be effective against aircraft when operating close to shore, for example in support of an amphibious operation. Measure 32 was a mid-colour pattern intended for use against submarines and to delay visual confirmation of radar detections. Measure 33 was a lighter pattern intended to be effective against submarines and surface vessel range-finding attempts in the northern Pacific and Atlantic Oceans.

== Colors ==
Typical color combinations
MS-31	MS-31a	MS-32		MS-33		MS-33a	Horizontals
Haze Gray 5-H	Haze Gray 5-H	Light Gray 5-L	Light Gray 5-L	Pale Gray 5-P	Pale Gray 5-P	Light Gray 5-L	Ocean Gray 5-O
Ocean Gray 5-O	Ocean Gray 5-O	Dull Black 82	Ocean Gray 5-O	Haze Gray 5-H	Haze Gray 5-H	Ocean Gray 5-O	Deck Blue 20-B
Dull Black 82	Navy Blue 5-N		Dull Black 82	Navy Blue 5-N	Ocean Gray 5-O		

== Patterns ==
Battleship designs
Name	Description	Pattern sheet	Photo	Known examples
MS-31 (Note: Maryland received a unique and presumably experimental dazzle pattern in late 1942 or early 1943, before the issuance of the SHIPS-2 Supplement; no designation or pattern sheet for it is known. The lightest color appears to be Haze Gray 5-H, making it a Measure 31 scheme.)	For Colorado-class battleships			Maryland
MS-32/1B	For Iowa-class battleships			Iowa
MS-31a/6B	For USS Nevada (BB-36)			Nevada
MS-31a/7B	For USS Arkansas (BB-33)			Arkansas
MS-31a/8B	For New York-class battleships		New York	New York, Texas
Adapted designs
MS-32/7A (aircraft carrier)	Adapted to Iowa-class battleships			Not used
MS-32/1D (destroyer)	Adapted to Tennessee-class battleships			Tennessee
MS-32/1D (destroyer)	Adapted to USS Massachusetts (BB-59)			Not used
MS-32/3D (destroyer)	Adapted to USS Pennsylvania (BB-38)			Not used
MS-32/3D (destroyer)	Adapted to New Mexico-class battleships			Not used
MS-32/3D (destroyer)	Adapted to Colorado-class battleships			Colorado
MS-32/6D (destroyer)	Adapted to New Mexico-class battleships		New Mexico	New Mexico, Mississippi
MS-32/7D (destroyer)	Adapted to USS West Virginia (BB-48) (Note: The sheet is marked "BB-45 [i.e. Colorado] class;" however the drawing is clearly specific to West Virginia, whose post-Pearl Harbor reconstruction rendered her decidedly different from her sisters.)			West Virginia
MS-32v6/10D (destroyer)	Adapted to North Carolina-class battleships			Not used
MS-32/11D (destroyer)	Adapted to South Dakota-class battleships			Indiana
MS-32/16D (destroyer)	Adapted to Tennessee-class battleships			California
MS-32v11/18D (destroyer)	Adapted to North Carolina-class battleships			North Carolina (Note: North Carolina's actual paint job only corresponded loosely to the pattern sheet)
MS-32/22D (destroyer)	Adapted to Iowa-class battleships			Missouri

== See also ==
- World War II ship camouflage measures of the United States Navy
- World War II US Navy dazzle camouflage measures 31, 32 and 33: aircraft carriers
- World War II US Navy dazzle camouflage measures 31, 32 and 33: cruisers
- World War II US Navy dazzle camouflage measures 31, 32 and 33: destroyers
