= World War II US Navy dazzle camouflage measures 31, 32 and 33: cruisers =

Dazzle camouflage of warships adopted by the U.S. Navy during World War II

Dazzle camouflage of warships was adopted by the U.S. Navy during World War II, following research at the Naval Research Laboratory. Dazzle consists in painting obtrusive patterns on vertical surfaces. Unlike some other forms of camouflage, dazzle works not by offering concealment but by making it difficult to estimate a target's range, speed and heading. Each ship's dazzle pattern was unique to make it more difficult for the enemy to recognize different classes of ships. The result was that a profusion of dazzle schemes were tried, and the evidence for their success was at best mixed.

Dazzle camouflage patterns used on cruisers are presented here. Patterns designed for cruisers were suffixed with the letter C, but many cruisers were painted in adapted patterns originally designed for other ship types (A for aircraft carriers, D for destroyers etc.)

== Colors ==
Typical color combinations
MS-31	MS-31a	MS-32		MS-33		MS-33a	Horizontals
Haze Gray 5-H	Haze Gray 5-H	Light Gray 5-L	Light Gray 5-L	Pale Gray 5-P	Pale Gray 5-P	Light Gray 5-L	Ocean Gray 5-O
Ocean Gray 5-O	Ocean Gray 5-O	Dull Black 82	Ocean Gray 5-O	Haze Gray 5-H	Haze Gray 5-H	Ocean Gray 5-O	Deck Blue 20-B
Dull Black 82	Navy Blue 5-N		Dull Black 82	Navy Blue 5-N	Ocean Gray 5-O		

Some patterns were designed to be used for either Measure 31, 32 or 33 depending on the colors used; these pattern sheets were marked, e.g., MS-3_/3D; in the following table the effective Measure is listed in parentheses after each ship in the last column. In addition, many ships were painted using colors for a different Measure than that marked on the sheet; these are indicated in footnotes.

== Patterns ==
Cruiser designs
Name	Description	Pattern sheet	Photo	Known examples
MS-32/1C (Note: The colors specified, Ocean Gray and Pale Gray, would normally be a Measure 33 scheme)	for Atlanta-class antiaircraft cruisers			Flint (CL97)
MS-32/2C	for St. Louis-class light cruisers		St. Louis	Honolulu, (Note: Honolulu of the very similar Brooklyn class used a variant of the St. Louis MS-32/2C design) St. Louis
MS-32/3C (Note: The colors specified, Navy Blue, Haze Gray and Pale Gray, would normally be a Measure 33 scheme)	for Omaha-class light cruisers			not used
MS-32/7C	for Alaska-class large cruisers			Guam
MS-33/8C	for Brooklyn-class light cruisers			not used
MS-31a/9C	for Baltimore-class heavy cruisers			not used
MS-31a/10C	for Cleveland-class light cruisers			Amsterdam
Adapted designs
MS-32/11A (aircraft carrier)	adapted to Cleveland-class light cruisers		Duluth	Montpelier, Duluth
MS-32/1D (destroyer)	adapted to Omaha-class light cruisers			Raleigh
MS-32/1D (destroyer)	adapted to Cleveland-class light cruisers		Miami	Columbia, (Note: Columbia received MS-33/3D in Measure 32 colors in early 1944 probably during her January drydocking at Espiritu Santo; she was repainted in MS-33/1D not later than the Philippines operation, most likely during her refit at Mare Island that summer.) Topeka, (Note: Used Measure 33 colors) Houston, Miami
MS-32/1D (destroyer)	adapted to Alaska-class battlecruisers			Alaska
MS-3_/3D (destroyer)	adapted to Omaha-class light cruisers		Richmond	Detroit (MS-32), Richmond (MS-32)
MS-33/3D (destroyer)	adapted to Cleveland-class light cruisers		Vincennes	Columbia, Denver, Vincennes (Note: Used Measure 32 colors)
MS-32/5D (destroyer)	adapted to Brooklyn-class light cruisers			Phoenix
MS-33/6D (destroyer)	adapted to Northampton-class heavy cruisers			Louisville
MS-33/6D (destroyer)	adapted to Cleveland-class light cruisers		Vicksburg	Birmingham, Vicksburg, possibly Biloxi
MS-32/7D (destroyer)	adapted to Portland-class heavy cruisers		Indianapolis	Portland, Indianapolis
MS-32/9D (destroyer)	adapted to Northampton-class (Note: the pattern sheet is marked "CA-27 class;" CA-26 Northampton had been sunk in November 1942) heavy cruisers			Chester
MS-33/10D (destroyer)	adapted to Pensacola-class heavy cruisers			Pensacola (Note: Pensacola wore MS-33/10D from October 1943 until May 1944, when she was repainted in MS-32/14D)
MS-33/13D (destroyer)	adapted to New Orleans-class heavy cruisers		San Francisco	Tuscaloosa, San Francisco
MS-32/14D (destroyer)	adapted to Pensacola-class heavy cruisers		Salt Lake City	Pensacola, Salt Lake City
MS-32/14D (destroyer)	adapted to heavy cruiser USS Wichita (CA-45)			not used
MS-3_/16D (destroyer)	adapted to Baltimore-class heavy cruisers			Baltimore (MS-32)
MS-3_/18D (destroyer)	adapted to Baltimore-class heavy cruisers		Quincy	Canberra (MS-32), Quincy (MS-32), Pittsburgh (MS-33)
MS-33/21D (destroyer)	adapted to light cruiser USS Nashville (CL-43)			Nashville
MS-33/22D (destroyer)	adapted to Atlanta-class antiaircraft cruisers		San Juan	San Juan, Flint
MS-33/24D (destroyer)	adapted to Atlanta-class antiaircraft cruisers		Reno	San Diego, Reno
MS-33/24D (destroyer)	adapted to Cleveland-class light cruisers		Wilkes-Barre	Pasadena, Springfield, Topeka, Astoria, Wilkes-Barre, Atlanta
MS-33/2F (stores ship)	adapted to Omaha-class light cruisers		Trenton	Concord, Trenton

== See also ==
- World War II ship camouflage measures of the United States Navy
- World War II US Navy dazzle camouflage measures 31, 32 and 33: aircraft carriers
- World War II US Navy dazzle camouflage measures 31, 32 and 33: battleships
- World War II US Navy dazzle camouflage measures 31, 32 and 33: destroyers
