= World War II US Navy dazzle camouflage measures 31, 32 and 33: destroyers =

Dazzle camouflage of warships was adopted by the U.S. Navy during World War II, following research at the Naval Research Laboratory. Dazzle consists in painting obtrusive patterns on vertical surfaces. Unlike some other forms of camouflage, dazzle works not by offering concealment but by making it difficult to estimate a target's range, speed and heading. Each ship's dazzle pattern was unique to make it more difficult for the enemy to recognize different classes of ships. As a result, a profusion of dazzle schemes were tried, and the evidence for their success was at best mixed.

Dazzle camouflage patterns used on destroyers are presented here; Measures 31, 32 and 33 referred to dark, medium and light color combinations.

== Colors ==
Typical color combinations
MS-31	MS-31a	MS-32		MS-33		MS-33a	Horizontals
Haze Gray 5-H	Haze Gray 5-H	Light Gray 5-L	Light Gray 5-L	Pale Gray 5-P	Pale Gray 5-P	Light Gray 5-L	Ocean Gray 5-O
Ocean Gray 5-O	Ocean Gray 5-O	Dull Black 82	Ocean Gray 5-O	Haze Gray 5-H	Haze Gray 5-H	Ocean Gray 5-O	Deck Blue 20-B
Dull Black 82	Navy Blue 5-N		Dull Black 82	Navy Blue 5-N	Ocean Gray 5-O		

== Patterns ==
Destroyer designs
Name	Description	Pattern sheet	Photo	Known examples
MS-32/1D	for Gridley (DD-380) and Bagley (DD-386) classes (Note: This sheet calls for the unusual combination of Ocean Gray and Haze Gray)	Starboard Port	Mugford	Bagley, (Note: Used Black and Light Gray (MS-32) to starboard and Ocean Gray and Light Gray (MS-33) to port) Helm, (Note: Used Measure 31 colors) Mugford, (Note: Used Measure 32 colors) Ralph Talbot
MS-32/1D	for Sims (DD-409) class	Port and starboard		Anderson
MS-32/1D	for Fletcher (DD-445) class	Port and starboard		Taylor, Mullaney, Bush, Hoel, Hall, Halligan, Newcomb
MS-32/3D	for Wickes (DD-75) and Clemson (DD-186) classes	Port and starboard		Lea, Badger, Breckinridge, (Note: Port and starboard patterns switched) (Note: Used Navy Blue instead of Black) Barney, DuPont, Bernadou, Cole, Bainbridge
MS-32/3D	for Porter (DD-356) class (Note: Sheet marked "DD-357 [Selfridge] class;" Porter had been sunk in October 1942)	Port and starboard		Selfridge, (Note: Selfridge received the MS-32/22D pattern in April 1944; by April 1945 she was wearing MS-32/3D) Moffett, Phelps
MS-32/3D	for Mahan (DD-364) class	Port; Starboard		Downes
MS-32/3D	for Somers (DD-381) class			Somers, Warrington, Sampson, Davis, Jouett
MS-32/3D	for Benham (DD-397) class			Mayrant, Trippe, Rhind
MS-32/3D	for Sims (DD-409) class			Russell, Wainwright
MS-32/3D	for Benson (DD-421) and Gleaves (DD-423) classes (Note: Sheet marked "DD-421 class," but used on both)	Starboard Port	Farenholt	Benson, Mayo, Niblack, Charles F. Hughes, Livermore, Eberle, Plunkett, Lansdowne, Mervine, Quick, Farenholt, Doyle, Endicott, McCook, Frankford, Kendrick, Laub, MacKenzie, Baldwin, Thompson, Cowie, Knight, Butler, Tillman, Rodman, Harding
MS-32/3D	alternate for Benson (DD-421) and Gleaves (DD-423) classes (Note: Sheet marked "DD-423 class," but used on both)			Buchanan, Kearny, Lardner, Boyle, Champlin
MS-32/3D	for Fletcher (DD-445) class			Radford, Haraden, Paul Hamilton, Hickox, McNair
MS-32/3D	for Allen M. Sumner (DD-692) class			Ingraham, Cooper, English, Walke, Laffey, O'Brien, Meredith, DeHaven, Mansfield, Hyman, Shannon, (Note: As Robert H. Smith (DM-23) class minelayer) Adams, Brush, J. William Ditter
MS-31/6D	for Farragut (DD-348) class			Dewey, Hull, Dale, Aylwin
MS-31/6D	for Benson (DD-421) class			Woodworth, Bailey, Meade
MS-3_/6D	for Fletcher (DD-445) class		Colhoun	Jenkins (MS-32), Capps (MS-31), Ross (MS-32), Rowe (MS-31), Twiggs (MS-32), Bearss (MS-32), John Hood (MS-32), Monssen (MS-31), Colhoun (MS-32)
MS-31/7D	for Farragut (DD-348) class			Farragut, Monaghan
MS-32/7D	for Gamble (DM-15) class (Note: Minelayer conversions of Clemson class DDs)			Gamble, Preble, Sicard, Pruitt
MS-32/7D	for Chandler (DMS-9) class (Note: Fast minesweeper conversions of Clemson class DDs)			Dorsey, Hovey, Hamilton
MS-3_/7D	for Fletcher (DD-445) class		Waller	Waller (MS-32), Pringle (MS-32), Evans (MS-31), Porterfield (MS-32), Callaghan (MS-31), Cassin Young (MS-32)
MS-3_/7D	for Allen M. Sumner (DD-692) class			
MS-31/9D	for Fletcher (DD-445) class			Saufley, Van Valkenbugh, Cotton, Hopewell, Uhlmann
MS-32/9D	for Dunlap (DD-384) class			Dunlap, Fanning
MS-32/9D	for Allen M. Sumner (DD-692) class		Ault	Moale, Charles S. Perry, Ault, Waldron, John W. Weeks, Wallace L. Lind, Lyman K. Swenson, Maddox, Blue, Taussig
MS-3_/10D	for Fletcher (DD-445) class		Boyd	Daly (MS-32), Boyd (MS-31), Stembel (MS-32), Bullard (MS-31), Kidd (MS-31)
MS-31/11D	for Sims (DD-409) and other single-stack classes		Stack	Ellet, Stack, Sterett, Hughes
MS-31/11D	for Fletcher (DD-445) class			Fullam, Watts, Killen, Metcalf, Hale, Chauncey, Jarvis, Gregory, Rooks
MS-32/13D	for Fletcher (DD-445) class		Morrison	Hudson, Stanly, Anthony, Kimberly, Morrison, Prichett, Robinson, Sproston, Cogswell, Knapp, Bennion, Richard P. Leary, McGowan, Picking, Halsey Powell, Norman Scott, Irwin, Preston, Porter
MS-3_/14D	for Fletcher (DD-445) class		William D. Porter	Terry (MS-31), Wadsworth (MS-32), Aulick (MS-32), Charles Ausburne (MS-32), McKee (MS-32), Wickes (MS-32), William D. Porter (MS-32), Lewis Hancock (MS-32), Marshall (MS-32)
MS-31/16D	for Fletcher (DD-445) class			Leutze, Isherwood, Hailey, Smalley, Stoddard, Claxton, Dyson, Young, Hart, Braine, Hunt, Cushing, Little
MS-31/16D	for Allen M. Sumner (DD-692) class		Haynsworth	Allen M. Sumner, Haynsworth, Hank, Gainard, Barton, Laffey, Collett, Harry F. Bauer, Tolman, Harry E. Hubbard, Lowry
MS-32/16D	for Benson (DD-421) and Gleaves (DD-423) classes			Meade, Edwards, Thorn
MS-32/18D	for Fletcher (DD-445) class	Port Starboard	Luce	Foote, Luce, Heywood L. Edwards
MS-31/21D	for Dahlgren (DD-187) class (Note: Seaplane tender conversions of Clemson-class DD's)			Thornton
MS-31/21D	for Fletcher (DD-445) class			Ringgold, Conway, Cony, Healy
MS-32/21D	for Fletcher (DD-445) class			Beale, Twining, Bradford, John D. Henley, Longshaw, Burns, Albert W. Grant, Stockham
MS-31/22D	for Fletcher (DD-445) class		Howorth	Howorth, Wedderburn
MS-32/22D	for Porter (DD-364) class			Selfridge
MS-31/23D	for Mahan (DD-364) class		Smith	Mahan, Cummings, Drayton, Lamson, Flusser, Reid, Conyngham, Smith
MS-31/23D	for Fletcher (DD-445) class			O'Bannon, McCord, Wren, Bryant, Hickox
MS-32/23D	for Benson (DD-421) class (Note: Sheet marked "DD-598 class")			Frazier, Kalk
MS-32/24D	for Fletcher (DD-445) class		Ammen	Nicholas, Ammen, Hazlewood, Heermann
MS-31/25D	for Allen M. Sumner (DD-692) class		Henry A. Wiley	Borie, Walke, Purdy, Massey, Robert H. Smith, Thomas E. Fraser, Henry A. Wiley, Shea, Gwin
MS-33a/27D	for Allen M. Sumner (DD-692) class			Alfred A. Cunningham
MS-33a/28D	for Gearing (DD-710) class		Southerland	Gearing, Frank Knox, Southerland, Chevalier
MS-33a/30D	for Allen M. Sumner (DD-692) class			John R. Pierce
Adapted patterns
MS-32/11A (aircraft carrier)	adapted to Allen M. Sumner (DD-692) class		Aaron Ward	Compton, Soley, Mannert L. Abele, Drexler, Samuel N. Moore, Putnam, Willard Keith, Lindsey, Aaron Ward
MS-31/2C (cruiser)	adapted to Fletcher (DD-445) class			Fletcher, Converse, Spence, Thatcher, Yarnall, Harrison, Charles J. Badger, Benham
MS-32/2C (cruiser)	adapted to Sims (DD-409) and other single-stack classes			Patterson, Morris

== See also ==
- World War II ship camouflage measures of the United States Navy
- World War II US Navy dazzle camouflage measures 31, 32 and 33: aircraft carriers
- World War II US Navy dazzle camouflage measures 31, 32 and 33: battleships
- World War II US Navy dazzle camouflage measures 31, 32 and 33: cruisers
