= Red Bridge Hydro =

Hydroelectric power plant in Massachusetts, United States

- Official name: Red Bridge Hydroelectric
- Country: United States
- Location: 5 Red Bridge Rd Wilbraham, Massachusetts
- Coordinates: 42.1762°N 72.4097°W
- Status: Commissioned
- Construction began: 1901
- Owner: Central Rivers Power LLC
- Operator: Patriot Hydro

Power generation
- Units operational: 2
- Nameplate capacity: 4.5 MW

Red Bridge Hydro (shortened to "Red Bridge") is a hydroelectric power plant located on the Chicopee River in the towns of Wilbraham, Ludlow, Palmer, and Belchertown, Massachusetts. It was constructed in 1901 and is currently owned by Central Rivers Power LLC and is operated by Patriot Hydro, an affiliate of LS Power.

== Dam, Powerhouse, Canal and Headgate ==
=== Dam ===
At the north end of the dam, is a 165 foot-long earth embankment with a concrete core. The middle section contains a 300 foot-long overflow spillway. The southern end is also a 362 foot-long earthen embankment with a concrete core. The highest point of the dam is approximately 51 feet tall. The overflow spillway creates a bypass that runs almost half of a mile (2,160 feet) to meet back up with the Chicopee River downstream of the powerhouse.

=== Power Canal and Headgate ===
The canal headgate is a wooden building with a granite block foundation. It houses 10 intake gates. The intake gates allow water from the reservoir to flow into the power canal. These gates are manually operated and have dimensions of 5.5 feet tall and 8.5 feet wide. The power canal is 340 feet long by 73 feet wide and 13 feet deep. It extends from the headgate to the intake structure (contains trashrack and penstock). The walls are made of cut Granite. Looking down from the headgate, to the right of the intake structure, is the ice sluice (a small dam on the side of the canal for ice to fall off of) which is made from stone blocks). The sluice crosses under Red Bridge Rd and back into the Chicopee River.

=== Powerhouse ===
The powerhouse is a brick building with a stone foundation. It has the turbine wells to run 4 units (generators/turbines). In the northern end of the building are units No. 1 and No. 2. These were horizontal water wheels with 40 cycle generators. They were retired in 1938 and were removed sometime after. Between 2009 and 2019, the penstocks for the units were removed. In the southern end of the building are units No. 3 and No.4, which are still operating. There are 4 discharge bays, one for each unit. The two operating units discharge water into the tailrace canal, which runs 735 feet back to the Chicopee River.

On August 22, 2023, part of the powerhouse collapsed. As of December, 2023, an investigation into the collapse is still ongoing, no determination has been made about the future of the plant at this time.

== Chicopee River Reservoir ==
The Chicopee River Reservoir (Red Bridge Pool) is a 180 acre impoundment (reservoir), formed by the Red Bridge Dam. It is neighbored by a 106 acre impoundment, located north of the main impoundment, which is fed by the Broad Brook. The main impoundment is fed by the Chicopee River and has a boat ramp (Red Bridge Boat Ramp). The boat ramp sits on the south side of the headgate.
