= Ludlow Village Historic District (Ludlow, Massachusetts) =

Historic district in Massachusetts, United States

- U.S. National Register of Historic Places
- U.S. Historic district
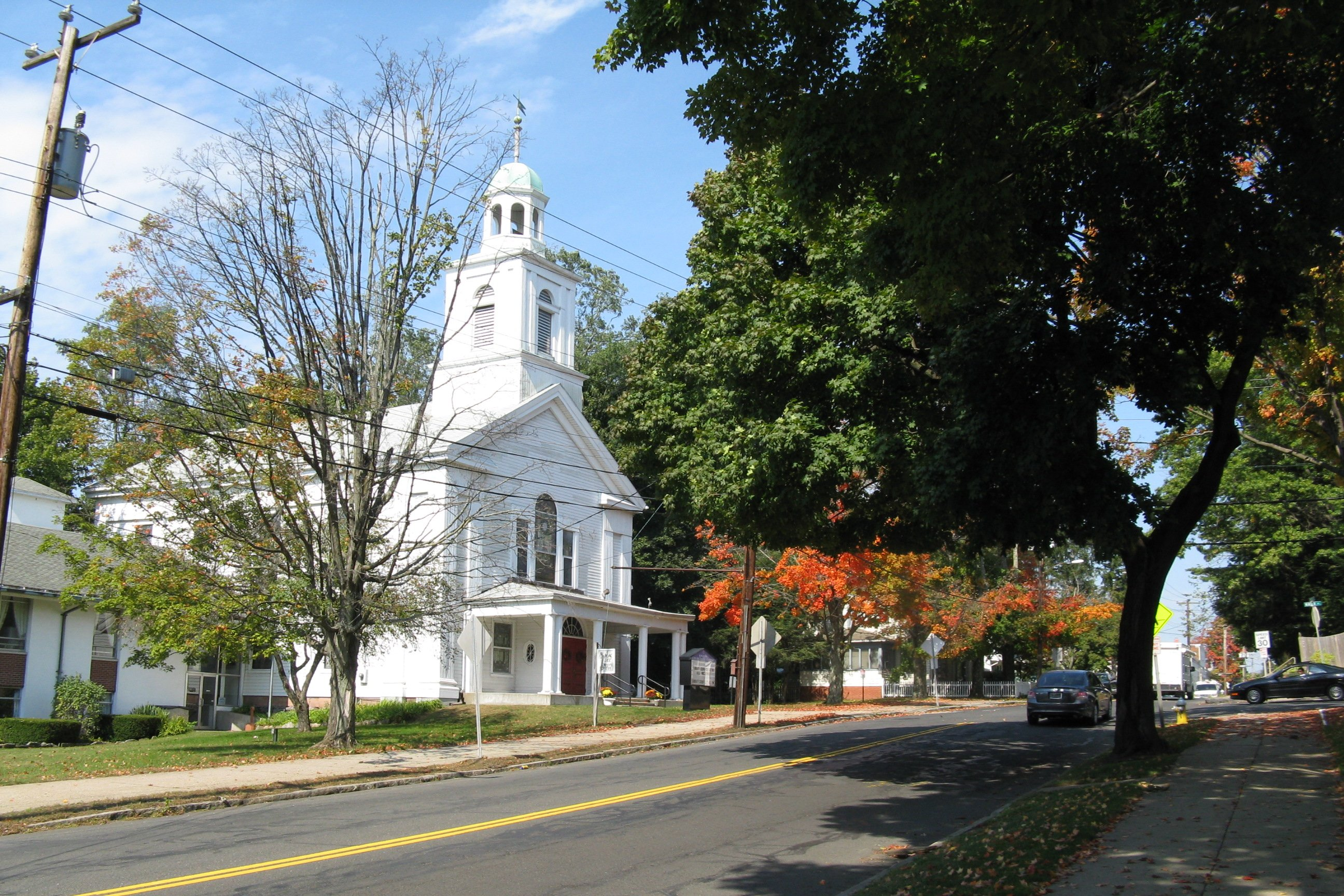
- United Church of Christ

- Location within Massachusetts Location within the United States
- Location: Roughly bounded by Winsor, Sewall and State Sts. and the Chicopee River, and crossing the Chicopee, above Red Bridge Rd., Ludlow, Massachusetts
- Coordinates: 42°9′55″N 72°26′32″W
- Area: 190 acres (77 ha)
- Architect: Multiple
- Architectural style: Colonial Revival, Queen Anne, Romanesque
- NRHP reference No.: 93000009
- Added to NRHP: February 22, 1993

The Ludlow Village Historic District encompasses part of a historic mill village, and the economic center of the town of Ludlow, Massachusetts, beginning in the later years of the 19th century. The area started to take over from Ludlow Center as the center of economic importance with the arrival of jute mills on the Chicopee River. The district is roughly bounded by Winsor, Sewall and State Sts. and the Chicopee River. It was listed on the National Register of Historic Places in 1993.

== Description and history ==
Ludlow was originally part of Springfield upon that community's settlement in 1634, and was separately incorporated in 1774. Its early settlement areas were on the north bank of the Chicopee River, which forms its southern border, but the town's civic center was located near its geographic center. The Wallamamumps Falls on the river were recognized as an ideal place for the development of water-powered industry, which took place beginning the late 18th century. The Falls was also the site of one of the first bridges across the river, which resulted in travel-related economic development as well. The village economy remained dominated by the mills, with a large complex built in 1901 just east of the present-day bridge.

The historic district consists of three sections: the first is a cluster of mainly civic and commercial buildings, bounded by Winsor, Sewall, East, and Center Streets. It includes the 1845 Union Church of Christ, the 1890 Hubbard Memorial Library, and the town's first high school (now a senior center), among other buildings. The second portion of the district is the mill complex between State Street and the river, and the third is the former power station for the mill complex, located about 4 miles (6.4 km) upriver on the Wilbraham side of the river.

== See also ==
- National Register of Historic Places listings in Hampden County, Massachusetts
