= Chicopee Falls Dam =

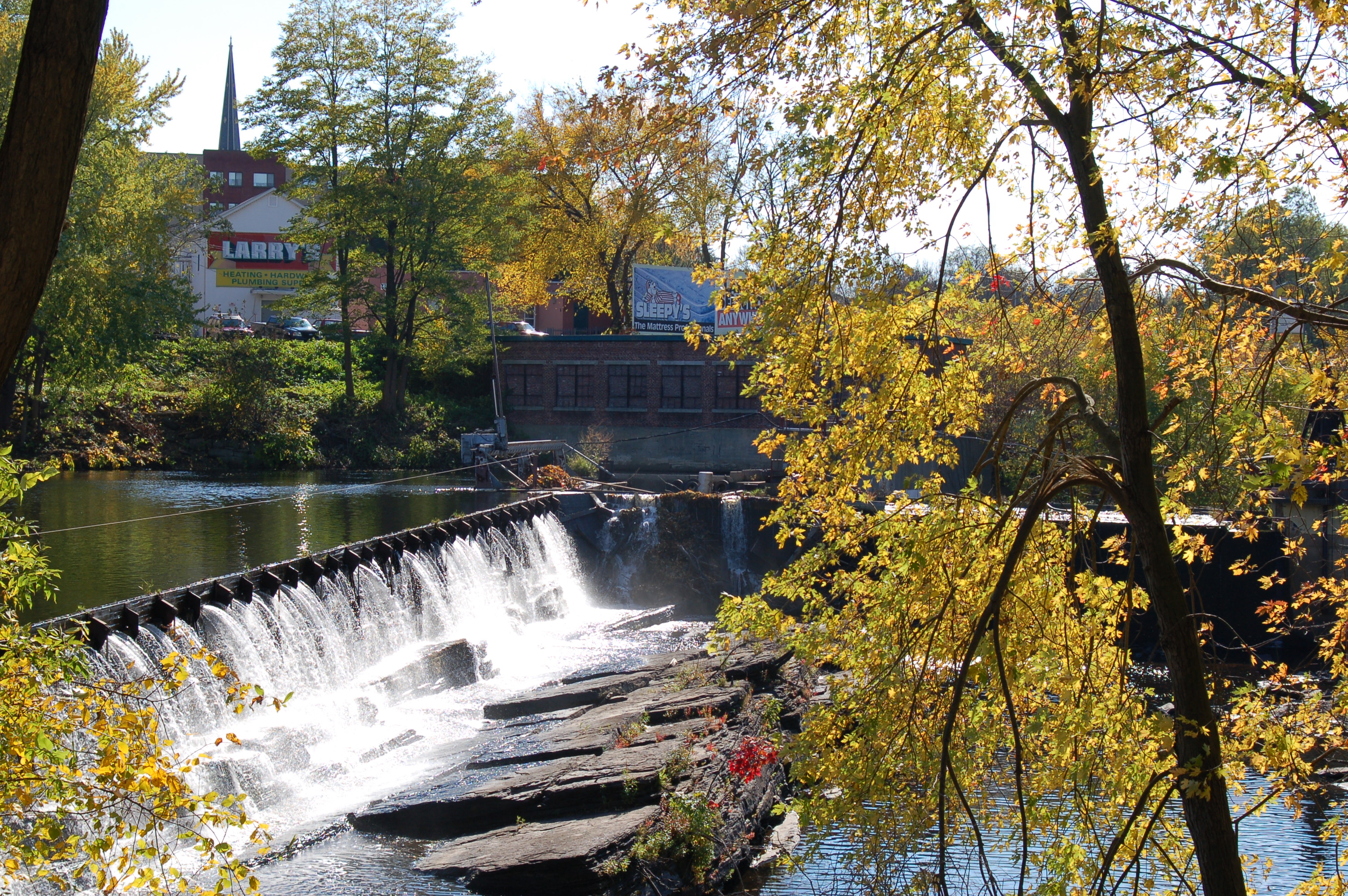
- Chicopee Falls Dam
- Interactive map of Chicopee Falls Dam
- Official name: Chicopee Falls Dam
- Location: Chicopee, Massachusetts
- Coordinates: 42°09′36″N 72°34′51.5″W
- Construction began: late 1800

Dam and spillways
- Impounds: Chicopee River
- Height: 10 ft (3.05 m)
- Length: 300 ft (91.44 m)

Reservoir
- Creates: Chicopee Reservoir

The Chicopee Falls Dam is a masonry stone dam that parallels Route 33 (Bridge Street) in Chicopee, Massachusetts. It is part of the Chicopee River Watershed. The dam was constructed in the late 19th century, and is owned by the City of Chicopee. It impounds the waters of the Chicopee River at Chicopee Falls, to form the Chicopee Reservoir.

This is the third-to-last dam on the Chicopee River before it empties into the Connecticut River just north of Springfield.

Flash-boards have been installed to raise the level of the impoundment above the original height of the dam. Therefore, the dam's effective height is greater than the 10 feet (3.0 m) shown in its specifications.

== History ==
In 1823, Jonathan Dwight purchased the water privilege at Skenungonuck Falls in Chicopee. He built a textile mill and five years later it became second-largest operation in the state. By 1831, settlers had developed two giant dams, two waterpower canals, and two manufacturing communities along on the Chicopee River.

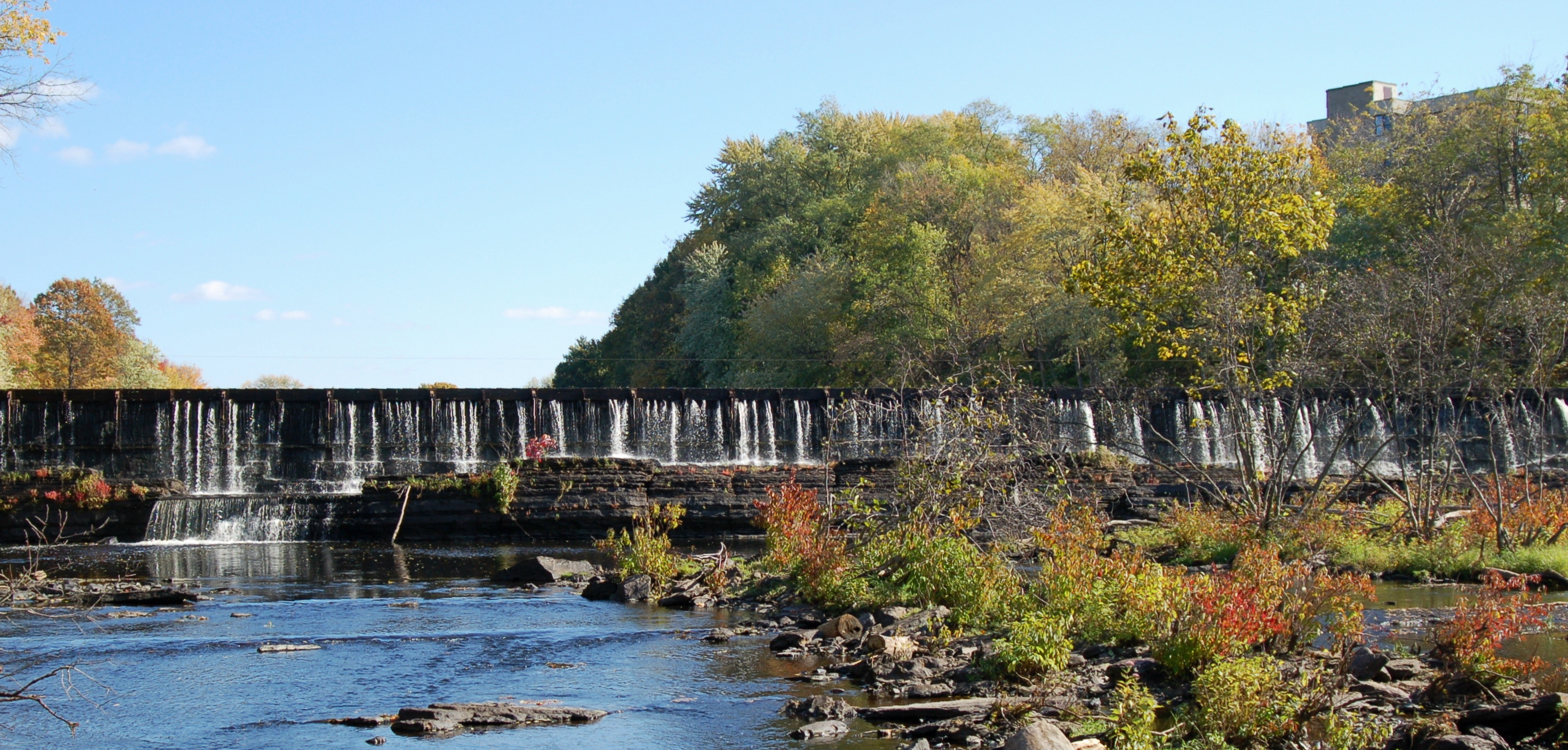
View from below Chicopee Falls
