= USS Chicopee (AO-34) =

Oiler of the United States Navy

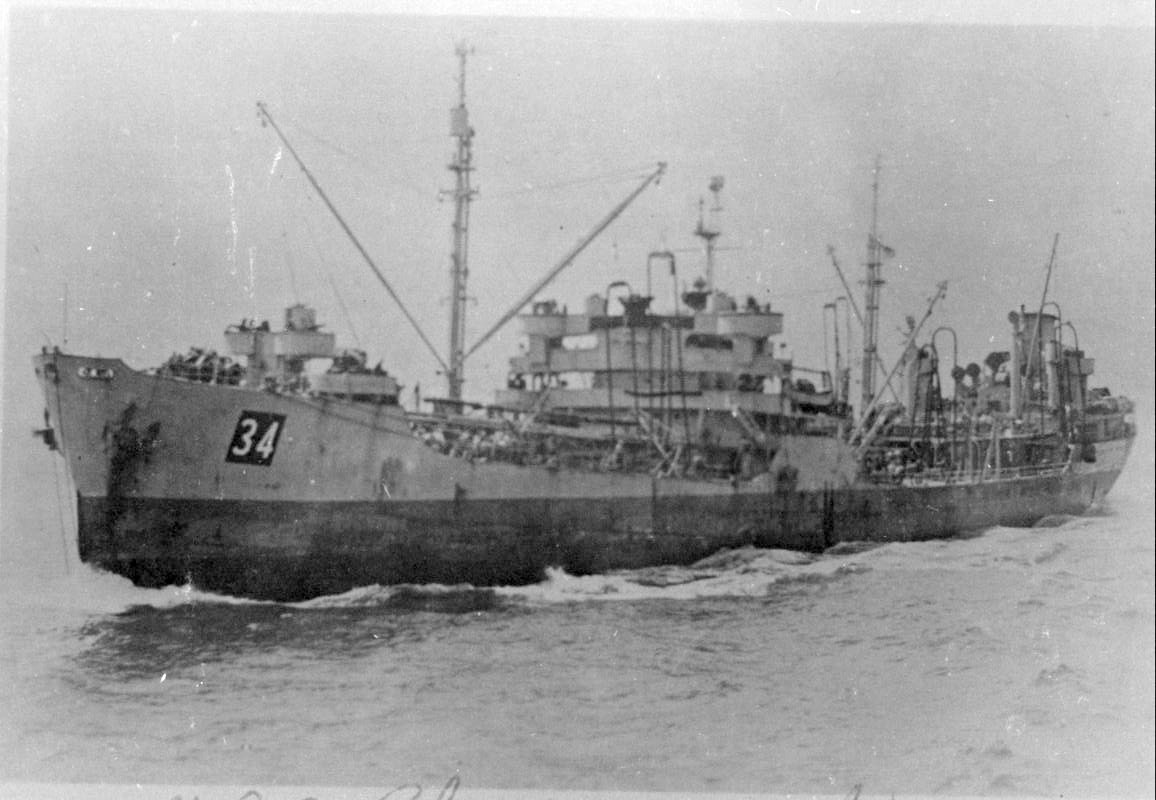
- Chicopee (AO-34) underway in the Mediterranean en route to Casablanca, Morocco, 2 June 1944

History

United States
- Name: SS Esso Trenton
- Namesake: Trenton, New Jersey
- Builder: Sun Shipbuilding and Drydock Co.; Chester, Pennsylvania
- Laid down: 14 May 1941
- Launched: 6 September 1941
- Sponsored by: Mrs. N. L. Lank
- Acquired: 3 January 1942
- Renamed: USS Chicopee (AO-34)
- Namesake: Chicopee River, Massachusetts
- Commissioned: 9 February 1942
- Decommissioned: 14 February 1946
- Stricken: 1 July 1946
- Identification: U.S. Official Number: 241220; IMO number: 5309815
- Honors and awards: 4 battle stars, World War II
- Fate: Returned to Standard Oil Company of New Jersey; converted to container ship, 1963

General characteristics
- Class & type: Chicopee-class oiler
- Displacement: 5,375 t (light); 22,430 t (full)
- Length: 520 ft (160 m)
- Beam: 68 ft (21 m)
- Draft: 30 ft 10 in (9.40 m)
- Propulsion: geared steam turbines; single shaft; 9,000 hp (6,700 kW)
- Speed: 16.5 knots (30.6 km/h)
- Capacity: 131,600 barrels (~17,950 t)
- Complement: 279
- Armament: 1 × 5"/38 caliber Dual Purpose gun mounts; 4 × 3"/50 caliber Dual Purpose gun mounts; 2 × twin 40 mm AA gun mounts; 2 × twin 20 mm AA gun mounts

USS Chicopee (AO-34) was the lead ship of her class of oilers for the United States Navy during World War II. She was the second U.S. Navy ship named for the Chicopee River located in Massachusetts.

== History ==
Chicopee was laid down as Esso Trenton on 14 May 1941 under a Maritime Commission contract at Sun Shipbuilding and Drydock Co. of Chester, Pennsylvania; launched 6 September 1941; sponsored by Mrs. N. L. Lank; acquired by the Navy 3 January 1942, and commissioned on 9 February.

After a short period as station tanker at Casco Bay, Maine, Chicopee made several oil runs between ports on the Gulf of Mexico and the U.S. East Coast. She departed Norfolk 8 June 1942 for NS Argentia, Newfoundland, and served as station tanker there from 12 June until 8 July when she sailed to Reykjavík, Iceland, returning to Norfolk on 25 July.

From August to November 1942 Chicopee resumed coastwise fueling operations. She then made three voyages to a midocean point with the Ranger (CV-4) task group to launch U.S. Army planes to North Africa, and in March resumed her oil runs between Norfolk and the Gulf ports with one voyage to Argentia.

Chicopee sailed from Norfolk 10 May 1943 as an escort oiler and arrived at Oran 23 May to serve as station tanker until 28 July when she got underway for New York. After a convoy voyage to Gibraltar, she was overhauled and on 8 October departed on escort oiler duty to Derry, Northern Ireland, and HMNB Clyde, Scotland returning to Norfolk 3 December for overhaul. From 3 February until 26 September 1944, Chicopee operated as an escort oiler between Norfolk and the North African ports of Casablanca, Oran, and Bizerte.

She departed Norfolk on 28 October 1944 for Pacific service and arrived at Ulithi 8 December. She sailed out of Ulithi supplying fuel for the U.S. Pacific Fleet Fast Carrier Task Force engaged in the Luzon, Iwo Jima, and Okinawa operations, and air strikes against Japan until the close of the war.

After serving as a station tanker in Tokyo Bay from 26 September until 28 October 1945, Chicopee cleared for San Francisco, arriving 9 November. On 14 February 1946 she was decommissioned at Mare Island and sold through the Maritime Commission for return to her owners, Standard Oil of New Jersey, 1 July 1946.

In 1963, the ex-Chicopee was purchased by Sea-Land in 1963 for conversion to a container ship. The fore and aft sections were coupled with a new mid-body to create the 16,401-GRT 607-foot (185 m) long SS San Francisco. In 1978, the extant portions of the hull of ex-Chicopee were scrapped, when the 1963 mid-body section was paired with new fore and aft sections, as the 17,618-GRT Sea-Land Adventurer. As of 2002, this ship was still operating as Maersk Koper. Having changed its name to MSC Koper, it was finally beached at Alang on 2 February 2010 and scrapped.

== Awards and honors ==
Chicopee earned four battle stars for World War II service.

== Gallery ==
Gallery of USS Chicopee.

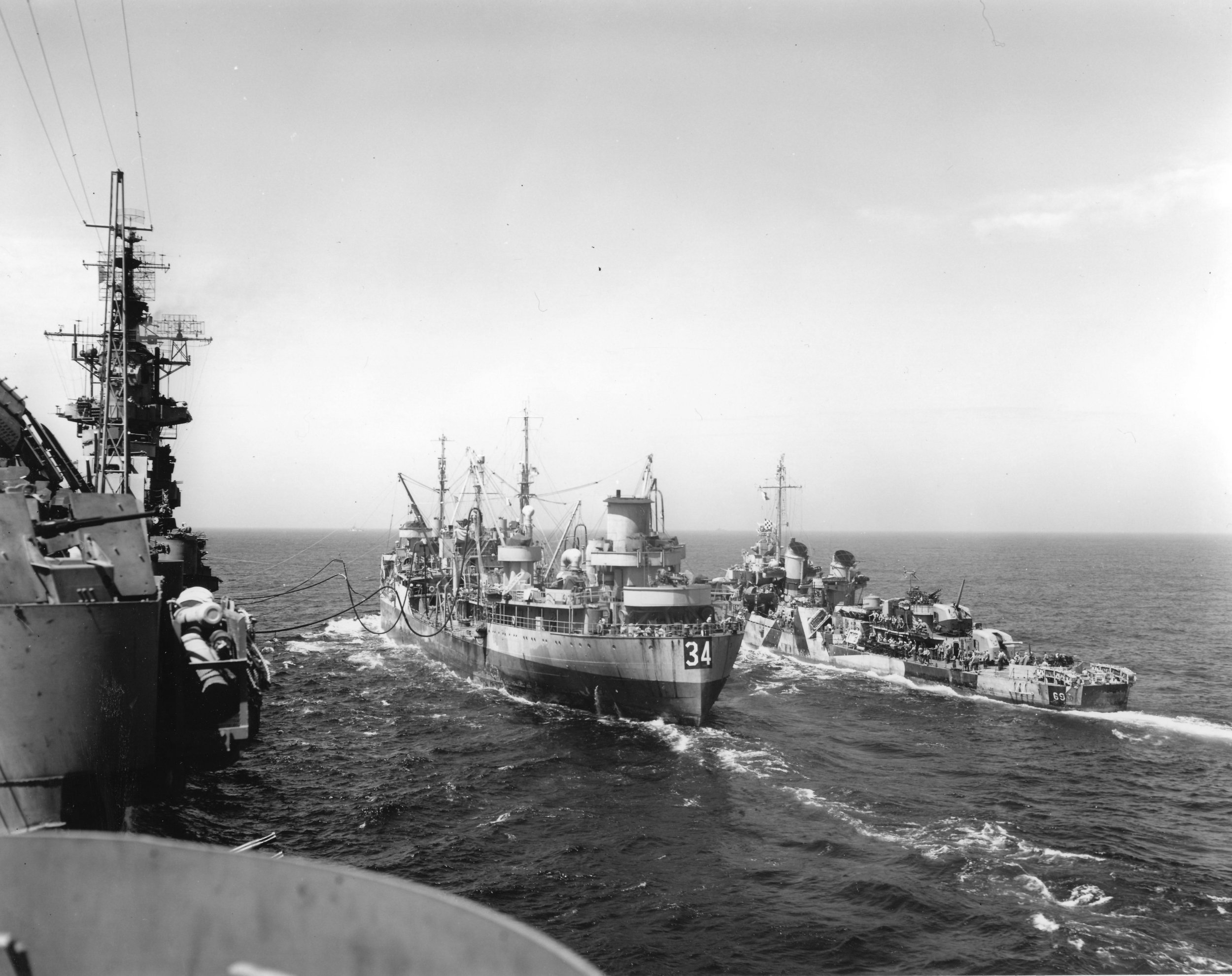
USS Chicopee (AO-34) refuels the aircraft carrier USS Intrepid (CV-11) to port while simultaneously refueling the destroyer USS Norman Scott (DD-690) to starboard, in the Pacific Ocean on 10 April 1945.

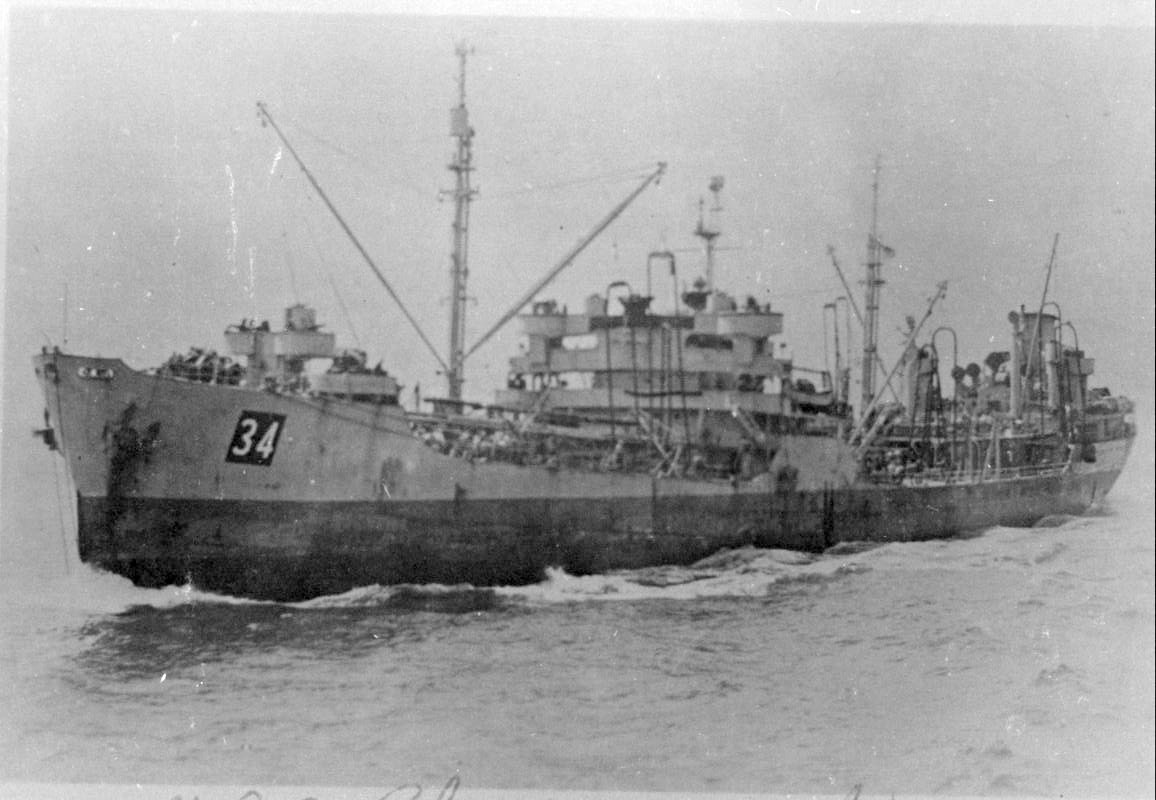
Picture of the fleet oiler USS Chicopee (AO-34) taken underway in the Mediterranean Sea en route to Casablanca, Morocco, 2 June 1944.

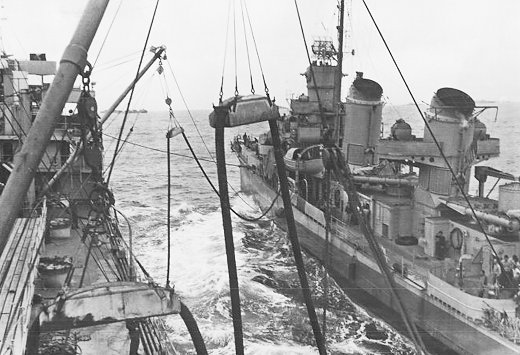
The U.S. Navy fleet oiler USS Chicopee (AO-34) refueling a Fletcher-class destroyer.

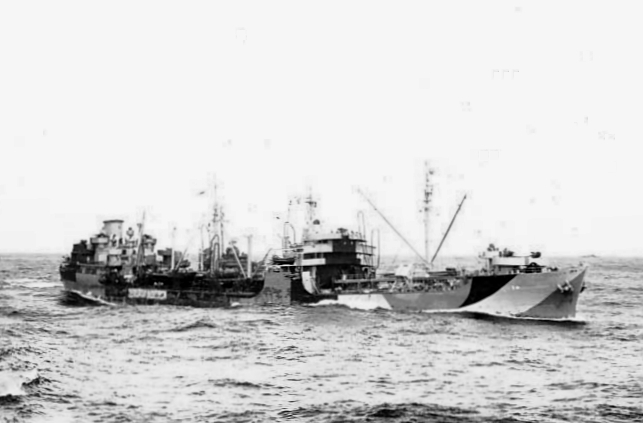
USS Chicopee seen from the light aircraft carrier USS Independence (CVL-22).
