= Chicopee-class oiler =

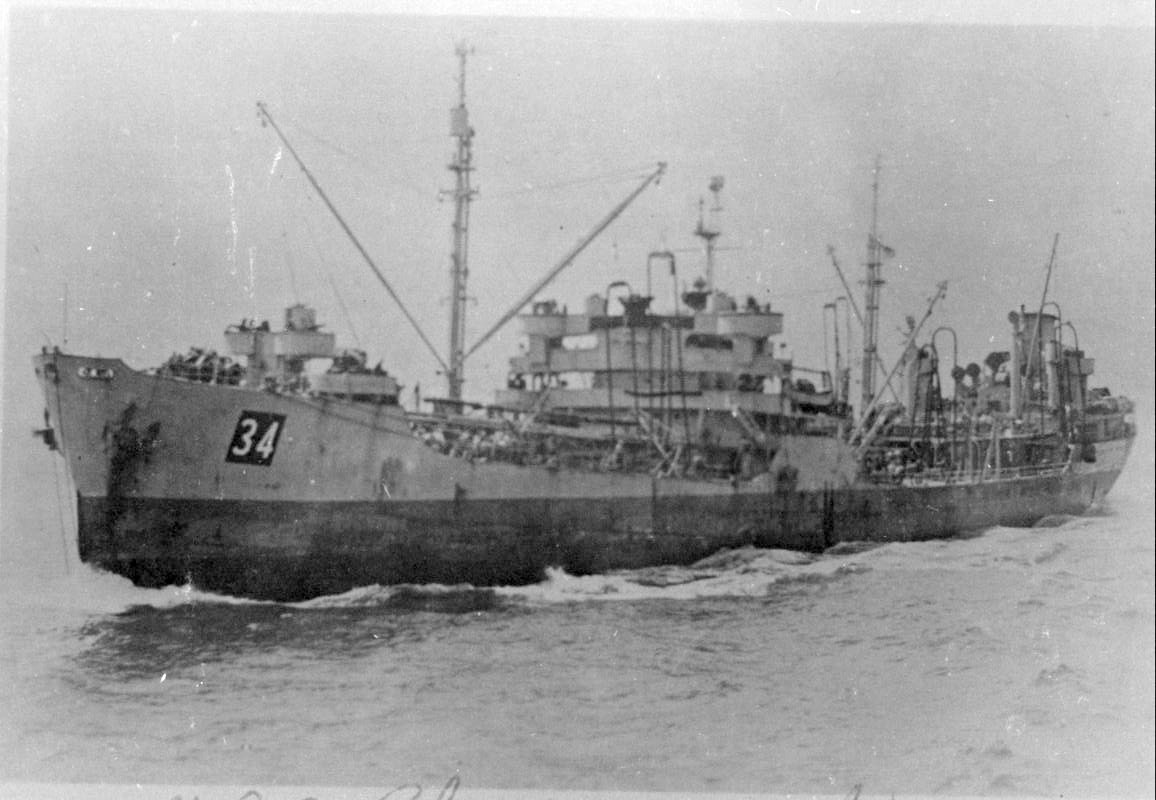
- USS Chicopee (AO-34) underway in the Mediterranean en route to Casablanca, Morocco, 2 June 1944

Class overview
- Name: Chicopee class
- Builders: Sun Shipbuilding & Drydock Co.; Chester, Pennsylvania
- Preceded by: Cimarron class
- Succeeded by: Kennebec class
- In commission: 9 January 1942 – 11 March 1946
- Completed: 2
- Lost: 0

General characteristics
- Type: Replenishment oiler
- Length: 520 ft (160 m)
- Beam: 68 ft (21 m)
- Draft: 30 ft 10 in (9.40 m)
- Propulsion: geared steam turbine; single screw; 9,000 hp (6,700 kW)
- Speed: 16.5 knots (30.6 km/h)
- Capacity: 131,600 bbl (~17,950 t)
- Complement: 279
- Armament: 1 × 5"/38 caliber gun mounts; 4 × 3"/50 caliber gun mounts; 2 × twin 40 mm AA gun mounts; 2 × twin 20 mm AA gun mounts

The Chicopee-class oilers were oilers operated by the United States Navy during World War II. There were two ships of the class, and both survived the war.

== Description ==
The class consisted of two petroleum tankers that had been ordered by Standard Oil Company of New Jersey and were acquired by the U.S. Navy in early 1942. Chicopee, the former Esso Trenton, was acquired by the U.S. Navy shortly after launching, while Housatonic, the former Esso Albany, was acquired after making two voyages for Standard Oil.

== Operational history ==
Both Chicopee class oilers operated in the Atlantic and Mediterranean areas from commissioning through late 1944, when they were assigned to the Pacific theater.

Both ships were returned to Standard Oil at decommissioning, and were later converted to container ships. The extant portions of the hull of the ex-Chicopee, were scrapped in 1963, while the ex-Housatonic was scrapped some time after 1989.
