= USS Housatonic (AO-35) =

Oiler of the United States Navy

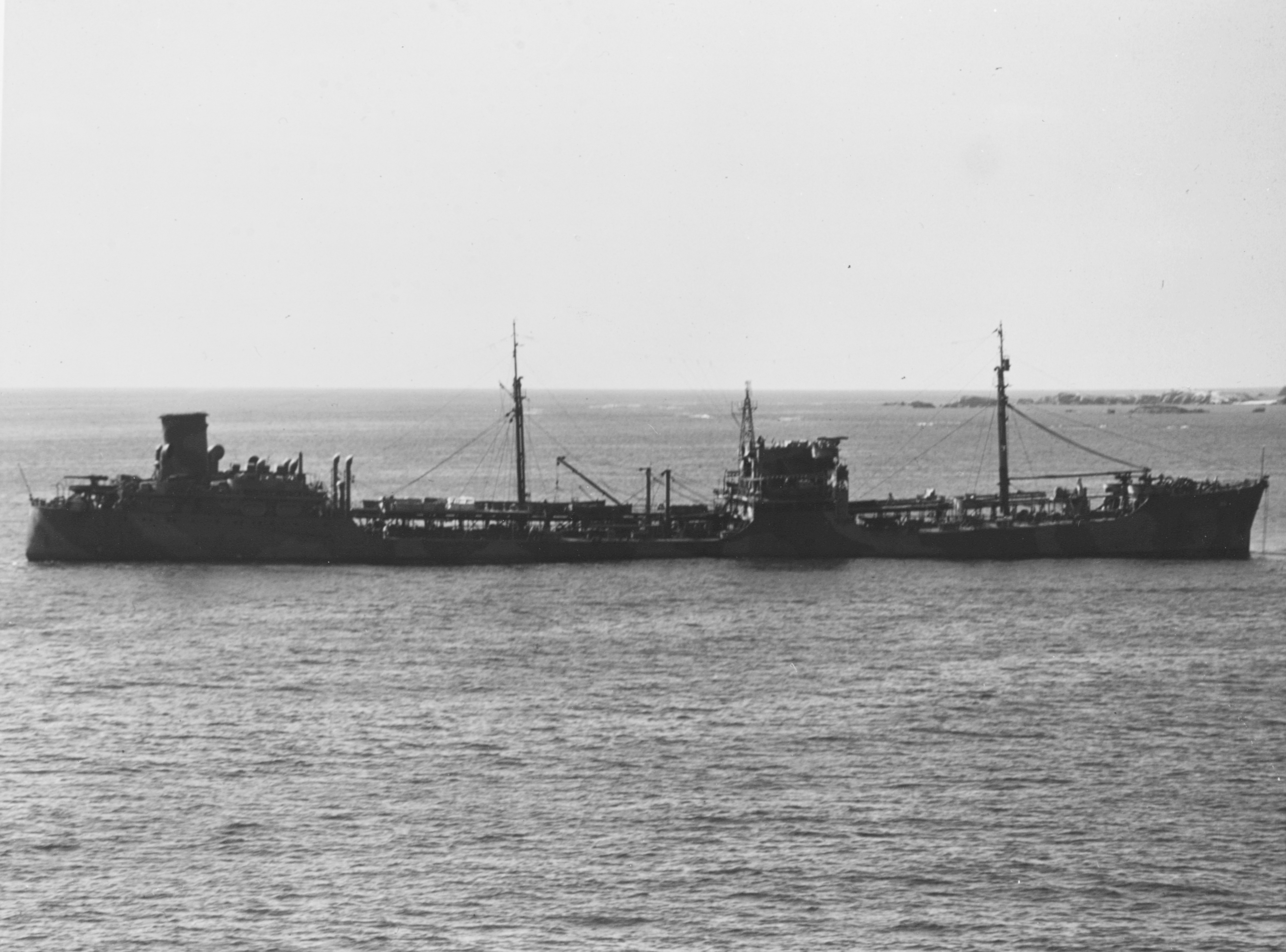

History

United States
- Name: SS Esso Albany
- Namesake: Albany, New York
- Builder: Sun Shipbuilding and Drydock Co.; Chester, Pennsylvania
- Laid down: 14 May 1941
- Launched: 6 September 1941
- Acquired: 9 January 1942
- Commissioned: 9 January 1942
- Decommissioned: 11 March 1946
- Renamed: USS Housatonic (AO-35)
- Stricken: before 22 October 1946
- Identification: IMO number: 5212426
- Honors and awards: 1 battle star, World War II
- Fate: Returned to Standard Oil Company of New Jersey; converted to container ship, 1963; scrapped after 1989

General characteristics
- Class & type: Chicopee-class oiler
- Displacement: 5,375 t (light); 22,430 t (full)
- Length: 520 ft (160 m)
- Beam: 68 ft (21 m)
- Draft: 30 ft 10 in (9.40 m)
- Installed power: 9,000 hp (6,700 kW)
- Propulsion: geared steam turbines; single shaft
- Speed: 16.5 knots (30.6 km/h)
- Capacity: 131,600 barrels (~17,950 t)
- Complement: 279
- Armament: 1 × 5"/38 caliber Dual Purpose gun mounts; 4 × 3"/50 caliber Dual Purpose gun mounts; 2 × twin 40 mm AA gun mounts; 2 × twin 20 mm AA gun mounts

USS Housatonic (AO-35) was a Chicopee-class oiler acquired by the United States Navy for use during World War II. She was the third ship of the U.S. Navy named for the Housatonic River in Massachusetts and Connecticut.

Housatonic was a tanker completed in November 1941 by Sun Shipbuilding & Dry Dock Co., Chester, Pennsylvania, under the name SS Esso Albany. After two voyages for Standard Oil Company of New Jersey, she was acquired by the Navy 9 January 1942, converted to a fleet oiler, and renamed Housatonic.

Shakedown training in Chesapeake Bay ended 10 March, and Housatonic joined Service Force, Atlantic Fleet. During the remainder of 1942 Housatonic carried fuel oil and aviation gas from the Gulf of Mexico to ports on the Atlantic Coast and in the Caribbean. A shortage of escorts necessitated the oiler's proceeding alone through waters infested with German submarines which were making many kills at that time. In July, the fleet oiler performed her first fueling at sea, servicing carrier Ranger (CV-4), cruiser Augusta (CA-31), and six destroyers engaged in ferrying U.S. Army P-40 fighter planes aboard the carrier from Port of Spain to Akkra on the Gold Coast of Africa. Fuel from Housatonic enabled this group to return to Port of Spain without stopping or putting into any port during the entire voyage.

In November, during Operation Torch, the invasion of North Africa, Housatonic fueled battleships, cruisers, and destroyers while they were at sea supporting the assault and capture of Casablanca, French Morocco.

On 13 April 1943 the United States Fleet Oilers Housatonic (AO-35) & Enoree arrived in Gibraltar they had a deck cargo of eight US PT's boats, the boats of Motor Torpedo Boat Squadron 15 (MTBRon 15)

During 1943, the fleet oiler made four voyages to the Mediterranean from New York and Norfolk fueling destroyers at sea as they escorted convoys which supported the victorious allied campaigns in North Africa, Sicily, and southern Italy. In between these voyages she made one run from Norfolk, Virginia, to Argentia, Newfoundland, and five from Texas ports to Norfolk. The close of the year found her at Bermuda training new destroyer escorts in the techniques of fueling at sea.

In 1944 Housatonic made three voyages from Norfolk to the Mediterranean, the first to Casablanca, the next to Oran, and the last to Naples, Italy. Then came a round trip from New York to Scotland and back with fast convoys. The highlight of this voyage came in Clyde, where she fueled RMS Queen Elizabeth.

Housatonic departed Norfolk on 20 November, bound for the Caroline Islands via Aruba, the Panama Canal, and Pearl Harbor. Arriving at Ulithi on 31 December, she joined the Service Force, Pacific Fleet. At the start of the new year and continuing until the Surrender of Japan, Housatonic operated out of Ulithi, venturing to sea to refuel carriers, battleships, battle cruisers, cruisers, and destroyers of the fast carrier groups. In this role, Housatonic supported operations that included the capture of Luzon, Iwo Jima, and Okinawa, as well as the bombardment of the Japanese home islands.

After the Surrender of Japan, Housatonic operated in the Yellow Sea fueling carriers, cruisers, and destroyers of the U.S. 7th Fleet which were supporting the occupation of North China and Korea. Floating mines made this duty particularly dangerous.

Housatonic arrived Tokyo Bay 17 October, and remained there until departing for the United States 12 November.

She arrived San Francisco, California, 26 November and decommissioned there 11 March 1946. She was transferred to the Maritime Commission 22 October and was sold to her former owner, The Standard Oil Company of New Jersey, 14 October 1947.

In 1963, she was converted into a container ship. The ship was scrapped some time after she last changed hands, 14 July 1989.
