= World War II ship camouflage measures of the United States Navy =

WWII-era naval vessel camouflage schemes of the United States Navy

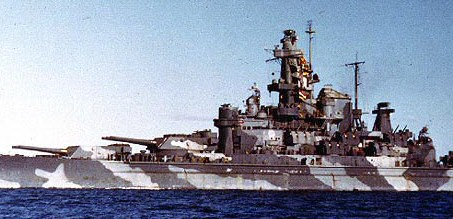
US Navy World War II ship camouflage measures - detail of the battleship USS Alabama in Measure 12 (Modified)

In 1935, the United States Navy Naval Research Laboratory began studies and tests on low visibility ship camouflage. Research continued through World War II to (1) reduce visibility by painting vertical surfaces to harmonize with the horizon and horizontal surfaces to blend with the sea, or (2) confuse identity and course by painting obtrusive patterns on vertical surfaces. Some camouflage methods served both purposes. American captains were permitted less freedom of interpretation with these schemes (other than Measure 12 Modified) than their British Commonwealth counterparts applied to Admiralty camouflage schemes.

== Early measures ==
With the likelihood of the United States entering the war, and after experiments with various paint schemes conducted in association with the 1940 Fleet Problem (exercise), the Bureau of Ships (BuShips) directed in January 1941 that the peacetime color of overall #5 Standard Navy Gray, a light gloss shade with a linseed oil base, be replaced with matte Dark Gray, #5-D, a new paint formulation with a synthetic alkyd resin base. Rather than waste the large quantities of Standard Gray already in inventory and aboard ships, BuShips directed the issuance of a black tinting paste (5-BP) which when mixed in stated proportions with Standard Gray would yield a close approximation of 5-D, with issue of the new paint in pre-mixed form to follow. BuShips also issued Ship Camouflage Instructions (SHIPS-2), laying out 9 painting schemes to be used throughout the Navy. Rather than issue premixed quantities of the less-used new shades, Light Gray (5-L) and Ocean Gray (5-O), yards and supply depots were directed to issue an untinted base paint (5-U) together with a blue-black tinting material (5-TM) which when mixed according to instructions would turn 5-U into either Light or Ocean Gray.

Dull Black	Dark Gray	Ocean Gray (early)	Light Gray (early)

The adoption of the new measures was very slow, however: as of late May the Navy's paint factories had yet to receive the ingredients needed for the new alkyd-based paints and only in late April had they received even the lampblack required for conversion paste 5-BP.

Early Measures (SHIPS-2, Ship Camouflage Instructions, Jan 1941)
Name	Description	Image
Measure 1	Dark Gray (5-D) overall except for Light Gray (5-L) structures above the stack tops. Steel horizontal surfaces were Dark Gray; wooden decks were left bare, except for aircraft carriers which continued to use Mahogany Red stain on flight decks. Measure 1 was to be the default paint scheme for the entire Navy in the absence of other instructions. Measure 1A was an experimental scheme in overall Sea Blue, later adopted as Measure 11. Measure 1B was another experimental scheme using overall Sapphire Blue. Measure 1C similarly used Navy Blue, later adopted as Measure 21.	USS Maryland in Measure 1 during the attack on Pearl Harbor
Measure 2	A graded system wherein the hull was painted in approximately equal bands of Dark Gray, Ocean Gray (5-O) and Light Gray, with all vertical superstructure surfaces painted Light Gray as well. Horizontal surfaces were as Measure 1, Dark Gray except for wooden decks. This measure was also widely used by the Royal Navy where it became known as the emergency scheme or Admiralty alternative scheme when there was insufficient time or where required pigments were unavailable to apply an Admiralty disruptive scheme.	USS Charles F. Hughes wearing Measure 2
Measure 3	Light Gray overall similar to the Navy's interwar peacetime scheme (Light Gray was very similar to prewar Standard Navy Gray), and to the Royal Navy peacetime Mediterranean Fleet paint scheme. Horizontal surfaces as Measures 1 and 2.	
Measure 4	Destroyer Measure 4 was black overall, except for Light Gray above the stack tops. This was intended for destroyer night operations but it was found that even on very dark nights, black ships were more noticeable than gray ones. Measure 4 was also worn briefly by the aircraft carriers Ranger and Wasp.	USS Conyngham wearing Measure 4
Measure 5	A painted white bow wave used in combination with Measure 1, 2 or 3 to give the impression of high speed at all times.	USS Northampton wearing Measure 5 (fake bow wave) with Measure 1.
Measure 6	Cruiser Measure 6 made a Brooklyn or St. Louis-class cruisers resemble a New Orleans-class cruiser, by painting a New Orleans silhouette on both sides: Light Gray on a Measure 1 ship, or Dark Gray on a Measure 2 or 3 ship. (Note: No ship is known to have been painted in Measure 6, 7 or 8 in 1941 while those Measures were officially in effect. However, in summer 1943 the New Orleans-class cruiser Minneapolis received a unique variant of Measure 8 designed to disguise her as a Benson-class destroyer. "This was done by painting the ship overall in Light Gray 5-L, painting on a false deck break & bridge windows in Dull Black BK and then using Ocean Gray 5-O for counter-shading to optically reduce the width of the superstructure and funnels. The camouflage was polished off by painting two huge Carley rafts on each side.")	
Measure 7	Similar to Measure 6, Cruiser Measure 7 made an Omaha-class cruiser resemble a Clemson-class destroyer.	
Measure 8	Similar to Measures 6 and 7, Cruiser Measure 8 made a Brooklyn or St. Louis-class cruiser resemble a two-funnel destroyer. This scheme was discontinued after causing station-keeping confusion among ships operating in formation.	USS Minneapolis wearing a variant of Measure 8, 1943
Measure 9	Submarine Measure 9 was Dull Black (#82) overall and is still in use.	

By the summer of 1941 it had become apparent that Dark Gray (5-D) was unacceptably visible under all conditions, and the "conversion" 5-D made from prewar #5 was also too glossy and prone to chipping and peeling; meanwhile Pacific Fleet experiments with new colors Sea Blue and Sapphire Blue were deemed successful. (Note: Sapphire Blue was considered the best color tried to date, but suffered from rapid fading and required hard-to-obtain ingredients.) Accordingly, in July–August Dark Gray was discontinued and new paint formulas Sea Blue (5-S) (Note: 5-S Sea Blue should not be confused with later aircraft Sea Blue, a much darker color) and Haze Gray (5-H) (Note: A different shade from postwar Haze Gray) were implemented, together with Deck Blue (20-B) for all horizontals, steel and wood alike. The tinting paste was altered to contain somewhat less black and more blue than before; this meant that Ocean Gray also became somewhat more bluish in cast at this time and all the 5-series paint colors now were categorized as Munsell 5 Purple-Blue. Until 1945 all USN "gray" and almost all "blue" shades were produced using this same blue-black tint (5-TMa), so that the paints represented different tones of what was effectively a single blue-gray hue.

Sea Blue	Ocean Gray	Haze Gray	Deck Blue

In September, Measures 1 through 8 were abolished and four new schemes promulgated in a revised edition of SHIPS-2. On 19 July Measure 12 had been prescribed for the entire Atlantic Fleet, and on 13 September Measure 11 for the Pacific. However, there was a considerable time lag between the issuance of new instructions, and paint being manufactured and distributed and ships actually being repainted; at the time of the Pearl Harbor attack on December 7, 1941, most of the Pacific Fleet was still wearing dark gray Measure 1.

In November aircraft carriers began applying a dark blue-gray flight deck stain (#250) approximately the same color as Deck Blue, together with a stain approximately Ocean Gray for flight deck markings (#251). The Pacific Fleet's surface ships, less carriers, were ordered into Measure 11 on 16 December 1941. The order also substituted 5-N for 5-S

Revised Prewar Measures (SHIPS-2 Rev. 1, Sept 1941)
Name	Description	Image
Measure 11	Sea Blue (5-S) overall, with horizontal surfaces (including wooden portions) painted Deck Blue (20-B). All visible canvas boat covers, tarpaulins and windscreens to be dyed in a color to match Deck Blue. It was used in the Pacific and Mediterranean for concealment from aircraft. Royal Navy submarines operating in the Mediterranean used a similar scheme. During the Battle of the Coral Sea and the Battle of Midway, ships wearing Measure 11 came under attack less often than ships wearing Measure 12.	USS Drayton in summer 1941 wearing experimental Measure 1B (note the light gray 5-L on the mast above the funnel and director), a precursor of Measure 11.
Measure 12 Measure 12 (Modified)	Sea Blue on the hull up to the main deck (hangar deck on aircraft carriers), Ocean Gray from main deck level to the top of the superstructure masses, and Haze Gray (5-H) for masts and other vertical projections above superstructure level. Horizontal surfaces painted Deck Blue. Canvas dyed blue. Sea Blue was later darkened to Navy Blue (Measure 12A). It was found to be ineffective against aerial observation during the early carrier aircraft battles of Coral Sea and Midway, so all-blue Measure 11 and its replacement Measure 21 became preferred in the Pacific. In Measure 12 (Modified), irregular patches or splotches were added to break up the ship's profile: Haze Gray splotches on Sea Blue (later Navy Blue) and vice versa, and Sea Blue (later Navy Blue) splotches on Ocean Gray. "These splotches should be obtained by extending the Navy Blue paint into the designated Ocean Gray paint area and vice versa. They should be about 1/3 the area of a rectangle 12 feet high by 20 feet long." There were no specific instructions on the positioning or shape of the splotches, which were left up to individual captains, yards or maintenance facilities, and the recommended size was frequently disregarded, so that no two ships looked alike. Measure 12 (Mod) was used extensively in both fleets during 1942. Unfortunately the splotches in most cases were too small to break up the ship's outline effectively, and at any distance resolved into simple gray.	USS Vulcan (AR-5) wearing measure 12 USS Roper wearing Measure 12 (Modified) USS Alabama wearing measure 12 (Modified).
Measure 13	Haze Gray (5-H) overall, with horizontal surfaces Deck Blue. This was the least used solid color measure during World War II. "Low visibility to surface observers in hazy or foggy weather especially when it is accompanied with periods of weak sunlight... Useful in submarine infested areas, where periscopic observers will see a vessel entirely against a sky background. High visibility under searchlight, and down-moon at close ranges. Very low visibility on moonless nights and at twilight" This was found to provide reasonable protection in the widest range of conditions, and became a standard paint scheme after the war under assumed conditions of radar observation, with Deck Gray substituted for Deck Blue.	
Measure 14	Ocean Gray overall. Used on many small craft, including minesweepers, PTs, SCs, PCS, and some Coast Guard vessels as well as several escort carriers (CVEs) throughout 1942, 1943, and 1944. "Useful for Protection against Submarine attack, where aerial observation is a lesser factor... In Atlantic or Pacific Coastal waters where weather is generally sunny, visibility is high, and bright moonlight is common at night."	

Asiatic Fleet: The Asiatic Fleet, based in distant Manila, was unable to obtain the new paint colors and so in November painted its ships overall in a color procured from local sources midway between Sea Blue and Ocean Gray, dubbed "Cavite Blue."

== Improved measures from combat experience ==
Thayer Blue

Wartime Measures (Mid-1942)
Name	Description	Image
Measure 15	An experimental dazzle pattern developed directly from British First Admiralty Disruptive Type. Used in late 1942 on at least three vessels, the battleship Indiana, the destroyer Hobson, and the oiler Tallulah, in Navy Blue, Ocean Gray, Haze Gray and (Hobson only) White	USS Hobson wearing Measure 15 off North Africa, November 1942
Measure 16 (Thayer system)	White with large polygonal patches of light sea blue (called Thayer Blue.) This measure was most useful in Arctic latitudes with extended twilight and frequent fog and cloud cover. "Especially well adapted for winter use in Northern areas where nights are long and days frequently overcast. It would prove useful against submarines in any area where attacks occur mostly at night." Purity of color was important for full realization of the Purkinje effect where some colors appear lighter and some appear darker at low levels of illumination. Darkening the pattern increased course deception, but increased visibility at night and in haze. This measure was used extensively through 1943 and early 1944 in North Atlantic and Aleutian waters until replaced by Measure 33. Captain-class frigates were delivered to the Royal Navy wearing this measure sometimes identified as the 'American Western Approaches' camouflage scheme.	Ships-2 pattern drawing for Measure 16 on a submarine chaser
Measure 17	A dazzle pattern of blues, grays and whites applied only to USS Santee, USS Augusta, and USS Chicopee; Measure 17 was the prototype for the later dazzle Measures 31, 32 and 33.	USS Santee wearing measure 17.
Measure 18	A rarely used pattern almost identical to Measure 12, but with Haze Gray instead of Ocean Gray upperworks, as in the later Measure 22.	

Within the first six months of combat, the United States Navy modified Measures 11 and 12 to meet the needs of Pacific Ocean operations. Sea Blue was found to be too light, and it was ordered replaced by new color Navy Blue (5-N), (Note: In fact the Atlantic Fleet had ordered the substitution of 5-N for 5-S as early as November 1941.) which used 50% more of the same tinting paste as Sea Blue and was correspondingly darker.

Navy Blue	Ocean Gray	Haze Gray	Light Gray	Deck Blue

Improved Measures (Ships-2 Rev. 2, June 1942)
Name	Description	Image
Measure 10	For submarines operating beyond the range of enemy aircraft. Submarine Measure 10 was Ocean Gray (5-0) on entire submarine above the water line, over all parts which were visible from the air including the numbers, capstan, running light boards and bridge rails. The radio insulators were to be dark and there was no boot-topping. Dull antifouling black paint was to be applied below the waterline. (Note: Low visibility for submarines when on the surface both to surface observation and low angle aerial observation. High visibility to high angle aerial observation when the submarine is on the surface or submerged in clear water. Will not offer the same protection as the black system to submerged submarines operating in areas where aerial observation is an important factor, but will be lower visibility against either sea or sky when observed by surface ships. Method of Application Paint The painting shall be carried over all parts which are visible from the air including the numbers, capstan, running light boards and bridge rails. The Radio insulators shall be dark. There shall be no boot-topping. The underbody shall be painted with current issues of black antifouling paints.)	
Measure 21	On the advice of United States aviators, Measure 11's Sea Blue was replaced by darker Navy Blue and the scheme designated Measure 21 in mid-1942. Overall Navy Blue (5-N), with decks in dark Deck Blue (20-B). This measure was used extensively in the western and southern Pacific from September 1942 through 1945 to minimize detection and identification by enemy aircraft. "Useful where greatest danger is from the air and high surface visibility must be accepted... Lowest visibility to aerial observers day and night in all types of weather. Low visibility under searchlight. High visibility to all surface observers in all types of weather." Measure 21 also proved effective under artificial illumination during night actions. Upper surfaces of aircraft operating from carrier decks were painted a similar shade of blue. Sailors were ordered to wear dungarees rather than white uniforms when topside, and white "Dixie cup" hats were dyed blue. The USS Texas is painted (as of 2022-2025 restoration) in Measure 21 as she was in 1945.	USS Pennsylvania wearing measure 21.
Measure 22	Measure 12 was reworked following recognition of the ineffectiveness of small splotches of paint, and the relatively low contrast between the shades used. Replacement measure 22 used Navy Blue low on the hull below the first continuous deck, with Haze Gray above that. Measure 22 used a straight horizontal boundary between the two colors rather than following the sheer of the main deck, making a characteristic gray "wedge" at the bow. This bold contrast at a horizontal line near the horizon reduced visibility to surface observers and created the illusion of greater range. This measure largely replaced Measure 12 where aerial observation was unlikely. "Useful for combatant ships operating in areas where greatest danger might be expected from gunnery action either from shore batteries or from enemy surface ships. Moderately high visibility to aerial observation at close ranges." This measure was used in the Atlantic and European coastal waters from the end of 1942 through the end of World War II, and was often referred to as "Atlantic two-tone." It was worn by shore bombardment ships in the Pacific from late 1944 after the destruction of Japanese naval aviation capability at the Battle of the Philippine Sea. Due to the desire for a darker version for greater utility against air attack after the appearance of the kamikaze, Measure 12 was revived in 1945, but amended so as to be identical to Measure 22 save for the use of Ocean Gray rather than Haze Gray.	USS Kidd wearing Measure 22 USS Mobile wearing Measure 22.
Measure 23	Replacing all-over Haze Gray Measure 13, Light Gray Measure 23 was in effect a return to Measure 3 for use by anti-submarine vessels in the tropics or subtropics, and ships operating in northern latitudes. Replaced by Measure 33.	USS Concord wearing Measure 23

Tropic Green system: Through 1942 the Camouflage Section had issued no instructions for landing craft, PT boats, Tank Landing Ships (LSTs) and other vessels expected to operate close inshore in Pacific jungle conditions, so individual commands resorted to overall green, or ad-hoc camouflage patterns in whatever green or brown paints could be obtained. In early 1943 BuShips began the development a green series parallel to the blue-gray series, but the process was slow and therefore the South Pacific Command as an expedient ordered its amphibious vessels to be repainted in Dark Tropic Green with "tiger stripes" in Light Tropic Green, both of which could be created by mixing standard 5-TMa blue tinting medium with yellow zinc chromate primer. According to a contemporary report, "The color of the foliage [in the vicinity of Bougainville] was surprisingly high in key, a brilliance that would have been unbelievable except for the very same observations made on first arrival in the Solomons group."

Dark Tropic Green	Light Tropic Green

== Late wartime measures ==
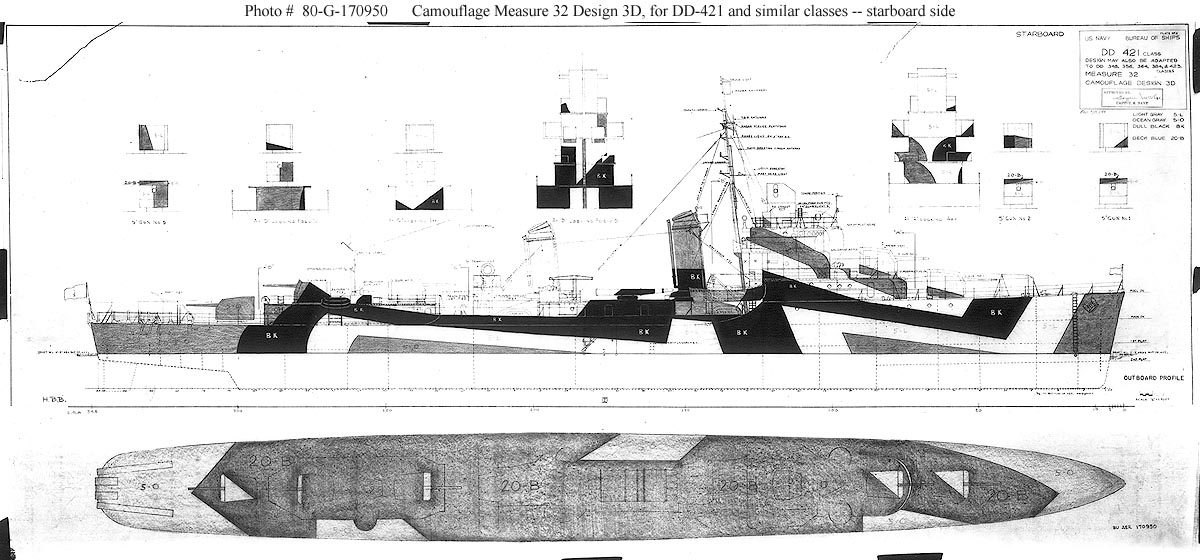
Pattern sheet, Measure 32/3D for Benson-class destroyers

The British Royal Navy established an Admiralty camouflage section in October 1940. Initial Admiralty disruptive camouflage schemes employed polygons of multiple shades of gray, blue and green so at least two of the colors would blend with background sea or sky under different light conditions. Experience showed the polygons were too small to be differentiated at effective camouflage ranges. Simplified Admiralty light and dark disruptive schemes were promulgated in 1942 to use larger and simpler polygons with no more than four colors.

Artist Everett Warner, who had headed the design section of Navy Camouflage during the First World War, returned to that post during the Second. On the basis of Warner's interpretations of recent Admiralty experience, BuShips issued a supplement to SHIPS-2 in March 1943 laying out multiple dazzle patterns under Measures 31 (dark), 32 (medium) and 33 (light) to conceal identity and confuse submarine torpedo fire control. Each measure included multiple pattern designs for ship classes so the pattern would not identify the class of ship. These measures represent the final evolution of dazzle camouflage.

Warner's office issued over 300 pattern sheets for Measures 31-33. Specific patterns in the dazzle measures were designated as, e.g., MS-32/3D, meaning the 3rd Destroyer pattern under Measure 32; an A indicated an aircraft carrier pattern, B for battleships, C for cruisers and so on. Often a pattern designed for one ship type would be adapted to another, so that, for example, the battleship North Carolina wore an adaptation of Measure 32/18D, originally a destroyer pattern. Some patterns could be used as Measure 31, 32 or 33 depending on the paints chosen; these were listed as, e.g., MS-3_/6D.

On 15 September 1943 the South Pacific command adopted the dazzle measures for all ships; (Note: Dark Measure 31 was prescribed for all vessels of the following types: ABD, ABSD, AFD, AGP, AGS, APc, APD, AR, ARB, ARD, ARG, LCI, LCT, LSD, LST, PF, PG, PT, PY, YFD, YMS, YN, YP, ARL, ARS, ASR, ATR, YAG, together with the battleships Tennessee, Colorado and Maryland. Medium Measure 32 was assigned to even hull numbers of types AK, AP, CA, CB, CL, CV, CVE, CVL, DD and DE, and all ships of types AD, AE, AF, AG, AGC, AKA, AM, AO, AOG, APA, APH, APV, AS, AV, AVD, AVP, CGC, DM, DMS, PC, SC, YDG, YO, IX, and the remaining battleships. Light Measure 33 was to be worn by all odd-hull numbered ships of types AK, AP, CA, CB, CL, CV, CVE, CVL, DD and DE.) in October the Pacific Fleet officially adopted the dazzle measures for most of its remaining ships.

Dull Black	Deck Blue	Navy Blue	Ocean Gray	Haze Gray	Light Gray	Pale Gray

Deck Green	Navy Green	Ocean Green	Haze Green	Light Green	Brown 4A	Green #1	Green #2	Green #3	Brown #4

Dazzle measures (Ships-2 Rev. 2 Supp. 1, March 1943)
Name	Description	Image
Measure 31 (Disruptive system, dark)	Dark pattern Measure 31 was a series of irregular geometric patterns using large polygonal and striped patterns of Black and Ocean Gray, or Black, Ocean Gray and Haze Gray. The patterns and tones were designed to resolve at a distance to an average low reflectivity of 10-20%. Horizontal surfaces also carried irregular patterns in Ocean Gray and Deck Blue. This measure emphasized mistaken identity and course deception to complicate submarine attack. Patterns were carried across the bow, and light gray was used aft to blend with the wake. Undersides of horizontal elements were countershaded in Pale Gray (5-P) or White (5-U) to reduce self-shadowing. This measure was based on the World War I dazzle system modified by observations in the western Pacific. In 1944 revised Measure 31a substituted Navy Blue for Black and eliminated countershading	USS Evans wearing Measure 31, Design 7D
Measure 31 green (Disruptive system, amphibious)	For landing craft and amphibious vessels, BuShips promulgated patterns under Measure 31/L, which was based on Measure 31 but used the colors Haze Green, Ocean Green, Navy Green, Brown 4A and Black with Deck Green. In mid-1944 the color range was simplified (Measure 31/20L) to Green #1, #2 and #3 and Brown #4. (Note: MS-31/20L was a "universal" design, a large rectangular camouflage pattern on which the outline of any ship class could be overlaid.) Measure 31/5P for PT boats used a base color of MTB Green with large patches of Navy Green (5-NG). Measure 31/4P combined Ocean Green (5-OG) with Navy Blue. Measure 31/T for amphibious transports was identical to base Measure 31 but used Ocean Green, Navy Green and Black.	Green MS-31/20L on a Manley-class destroyer-transport LSM-152 wearing the green amphibious Measure 31 variant
Measure 32 (Disruptive system, medium)	Medium pattern Measure 32 was similar to Measure 31 but somewhat lighter, a mixture of obtrusive polygons in Black against background polygons of Light Gray, or Light Gray and Ocean Gray. The patterns and tones were designed to resolve at a distance to an average medium reflectivity of 20-30%. Measure 32 was applied to most surface ships in the Pacific during 1944, but in 1945 the Pacific Fleet reverted to Measure 12, 21 or 22 in the revised 1945 colors. As with Measure 31, there were also amphibious-craft patterns under MS-32/L in Light Green, Ocean Green, Brown 4A and Black. Measures 32/3SS and 32/9SS were submarine patterns that used a multiplicity of carefully shaded grays to counteract light and shadow and reduce the visibility of a submarine on the surface. USS Saratoga wearing Measure 32, Design 11A. USS Duluth also wearing Measure 32, Design 11A, an adaptation of the same aircraft carrier pattern to a cruiser.	USS Farenholt wearing Measure 32, Design 3D; compare to the Benson-class pattern sheet above. USS Honolulu wearing Measure 32, Design 2C.
Measure 33 (Disruptive system, light)	Light pattern Measure 33 was a mixture of polygons in Ocean Gray and Light Gray or Pale Gray, or Navy Blue with Haze Gray and Pale Gray similar to the Admiralty Western Approaches camouflage scheme. This was considered very suitable for weather conditions in northern waters and replaced 16 and 23.	USS Flint wearing Measure 33, Design 22D

In January 1945 BuShips revised its paint formulations due to a shortage of blue pigment, and the realization that tone was far more important than hue in camouflage effect, eliminating the blue-purple shades which had characterized nearly all Navy ship colors whether called "blue" or "gray." The new paints were neutral grays, Navy Gray replacing Navy Blue (but confusingly receiving the designation "5-N" while Navy Blue became "5-NB"), and Deck Gray replacing Deck Blue. Ocean Gray and Haze Gray retained their names but lost their bluish cast. However, the new paints (which were shipped pre-mixed, not as tinting paste) were generally only available in stateside yards, while ships repainted at forward bases continued to use the older bluish colors. Moreover, for Measure 22 (but not 12 or 21), Navy Blue was still prescribed until existing stocks were exhausted.

Navy Gray	Ocean Gray (1945)	Haze Gray (1945)	Light Gray (1945)	Deck Gray

In February the Pacific Fleet, deciding that the primary threat to its ships was now kamikaze, directed that all ships be repainted in Measure 12, 21 or 22, and dazzle schemes began to disappear again. All auxiliaries and odd-numbered cruiser divisions, destroyer squadrons and destroyer-escort divisions were to be painted in Measure 21, and all even-numbered CA/CL divisions, DD squadrons and DE divisions in Measure 22. The Atlantic Fleet did not get this memo, and during 1945 ships scheduled for Pacific transfer were repainted in dazzle, only to be painted again in Measure 21 or 22 on arrival at the West Coast or Hawaii.

== US Navy ship camouflage paints ==
Fleet colors
Name	Navy designation	1929 Munsell value	Reflectivity	Gloss	Formulation
Base (White)	5-U	N 10/0	75	3	Pre-mixed; alkyd paint medium
Thayer Blue	5-B	5B 8/2	50	3	1 pint Blue Tinting Material 5-BTM per 5 gal 5-U
Pale Gray	5-P	5PB 8/1	55		1 pint Tinting Material 5-TMa per 20 gal 5-U
Standard Navy Gray	5	10B 6.5/1.5**	44%	44	Pre-mixed; linseed-oil base
Light Gray (early)	5-L	2PB 6.7/0.4*	40%	8	9 oz Tinting Material 5-TM per 5 gal 5-U
Light Gray	5-L	5PB 7/2	35%	3	1 pint Tinting Material 5-TMa per 5 gal 5-U
Light Gray (late)	5-L (#37)	N 7/0	37%		Premixed
Haze Gray	5-H	5PB 6/2	28%	3	2 pints Tinting Material 5-TMa per 5 gal 5-U
Haze Gray (late)	5-H (#27)	N 6/0	27%		Premixed
Ocean Gray (early)	5-O	3PB 4.3/1.4*	16%	1	60 oz Tinting Material 5-TM per 5 gal 5-U
Ocean Gray	5-O	5PB 5/2	17%	3	5 pints Tinting Material 5-TMa per 5 gal 5-U
Ocean Gray (late)	5-O (#17)	N 5/0	17%		Premixed
Sea Blue	5-S	5PB 4/4	11%	3	10 pints Tinting Material 5-TMa per 5 gal 5-U
Navy Blue	5-N (5-NB)	5PB 3.4/3	9%	4	15 pints Tinting Material 5-TMa per 5 gal 5-U
Navy Gray	5-N (#7)	N 3.4/0	7%		Premixed
Dark Gray	5-D	N 3/0**	6%	1	Premixed: 26.2 lb lampblack in 100 gal alkyd paint medium
Dark Gray (conversion)	5-D	5PB 2.7/0.8*	?	?	1.25 lb Black Paste 5-BP per 5 gal #5 Std Navy Gray
Dull Black	82 (#13)	N 2.5/0	3%	1	Premixed
Deck Blue	20-B	5PB 3/4	5%	11	20 pints Tinting Material 20-TM per 5 gal 20-U
Deck Gray	20 (#4)	N 3/0	4%	14	Premixed
Flight Deck Stain (early)	250	5PB 3/2**			Premixed
Flight Deck Stain (mid)	21	5PB 4.5/3**			Premixed
Flight Deck Stain (late)	21	5PB 3/4**			Premixed

Amphibious colors
Name	Navy designation	1929 Munsell value	Reflectivity	Gloss	Formulation
Brown	1A	5YR 2/2			Bureau of Yards and Docks paint***
Brown	2A	5YR 3/4			Bureau of Yards and Docks paint
Brown	3A	10YR 3.5/3			Bureau of Yards and Docks paint
Brown	4A	10YR 5/6			Bureau of Yards and Docks paint
Green	1A	5GY 3/2			Bureau of Yards and Docks paint
Green	2A	5GY 3.5/4			Bureau of Yards and Docks paint
Green	3A	5G 4.5/2			Bureau of Yards and Docks paint
Green	4A	5GY 4/6			Bureau of Yards and Docks paint
Forest Green					US Marine Corps paint
Olive Drab	(Army) OD#8				US Army paint
Light Tropic Green		5G 5/8			2 parts (blue) Tinting Material 5-TMa to 5 parts #84 zinc chromate primer
Dark Tropic Green	-	5BG 4/4			4 parts (blue) Tinting Material 5-TMa to 5 parts #84 zinc chromate primer
Pale Green	5-PG	5GY 8/2	55%		1 pint Green Tinting Material 5-GTM per 15 gal 5-U
Light Green	5-LG	5GY 7/2	37%		1 pint Green Tinting Material 5-GTM per 5 gal 5-U
Haze Green	5-HG	5GY 6/2	30%		2 pints Green Tinting Material 5-GTM per 5 gal 5-U
Ocean Green	5-OG	5GY 5/2	20%		12 pints Green Tinting Material 5-GTM per 5 gal 5-U
MTB Green	-	6GY 4/2**	?		1 part Navy Green 5-NG to 5 parts Ocean Green 5-OG
Navy Green	5-NG	10GY 3/2	7%		5 parts green tint 5-GTM to 4 parts blue tint 5-TMa to 1 part 5-U
Deck Green	20-G	10GY 2/2	3.5%		4 parts green tint 5-GTM to 20 parts blue tint 5-TMa to 1 part 20-U
Green	#1	5GY 5.5/3			Premixed
Green	#2	5GY 4/2			Premixed
Green	#3	5GY 2.5/2			Premixed
Brown	#4	10YR 4/3			Premixed

* Not a specification; measured by the US Bureau of Standards in October 1941
** Not a specification; estimated
*** In other words, paint issued by BY&D for shore facilities and their equipment, procured by Amphibious Force crews during mid to late 1942

== See also ==
- Lozenge camouflage

== Bibliography ==
=== Independent sources ===
- Raven, Alan. "The Development of Naval Camouflage".
- Sumrall, Robert F. (February 1973). "Ship Camouflage (WWII): Deceptive Art". United States Naval Institute Proceedings: 67–81.

=== Primary sources ===
- US Navy Bureau of Ships (January 1941). "SHIPS-2: Ship Camouflage Instructions".
- US Navy Bureau of Ships (September 1941). "SHIPS-2: Ship Camouflage Instructions, First Revision".
- US Navy Bureau of Ships (June 1942). "SHIPS-2: Ship Camouflage Instructions, Second Revision".
- US Navy Bureau of Ships (March 1943). "SHIPS-2: Ship Camouflage Instructions, Second Revision Supplement".
