= Chicopee River =

River in Massachusetts, United States

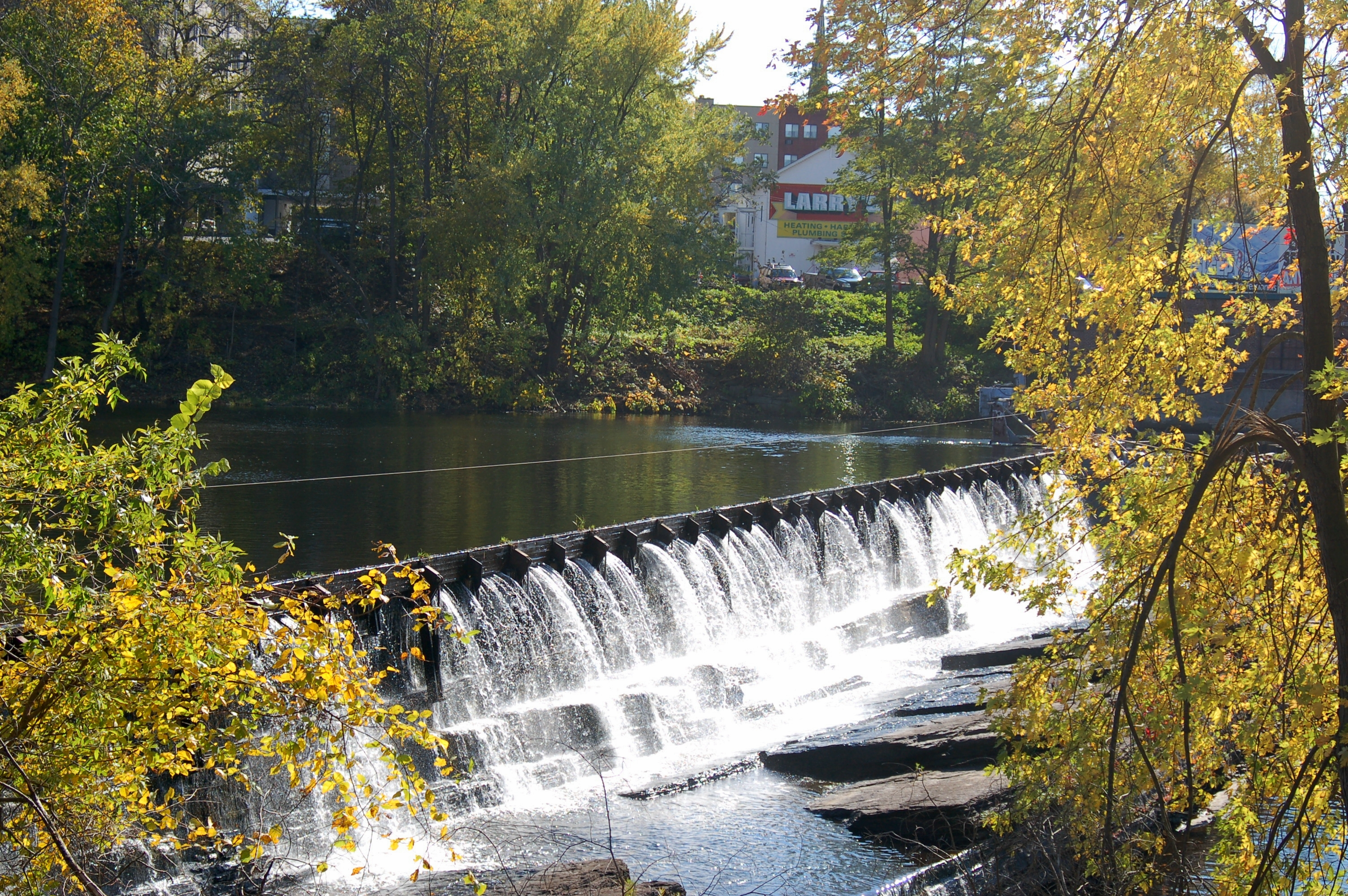
- Chicopee Falls
- Etymology: "violent/raging/turbulent waters" in an Algonquian language

Location
- Country: US

Physical characteristics
- Source
  - location: Palmer, Massachusetts
  - coordinates: 42.1807°N 72.3654°W
- Mouth
  - location: Connecticut River
  - coordinates: 42.1482°N 72.6217°W
- Length: 18.0 mi (29.0 km)
- Basin size: 721 mi^{2} (1,870 km^{2})

The Chicopee River is an 18.0-mile-long (29.0 km) tributary of the Connecticut River in the Pioneer Valley, Massachusetts, known for fast-moving water and its extraordinarily large basin: the Connecticut River's largest tributary basin. The Chicopee River originates in a Palmer, Massachusetts village called Three Rivers as a confluence of the Ware, Quaboag and Swift rivers. It passes through Wilbraham, Ludlow, and the Indian Orchard neighborhood of Springfield.

After forming the border between Springfield and Chicopee, Massachusetts for a short distance, the river then flows in a sharply curving path through the city of Chicopee and into the Connecticut River. (Chicopee was part of Springfield until 1848.)

== Watershed ==
Although the Chicopee River itself is only 18 miles (29 km) long, its drainage area is the largest in Massachusetts at 721 square miles (1,870 km^{2}), and the largest tributary area to the Connecticut River. The Chicopee River Watershed includes all or part of 32 cities and towns.

Upstream of the Chicopee River on the Swift River, the Quabbin Reservoir provides drinking water to Eastern Massachusetts (MWRA service area) and Chicopee itself via the Chicopee Valley Aqueduct.

== Water power potential ==
During the Industrial Revolution, the Chicopee River became a particularly sought-after destination for hydropower, largely because it drops 260 feet (79 m) during its 18-mile (29 km) course to the Connecticut River. By comparison, the meandering Connecticut River drops just 50 feet (15 m) from Chicopee to Old Saybrook, Connecticut, where it empties into the Long Island Sound. For this reason, numerous mills were built along the Chicopee River; today, many of them can be found in various states of repurposing, with a particularly famous mill in Springfield Indian Orchard serving as artists' space.

== Dams and crossings ==
Due in part to its precipitous drop, as of 2011, there are six hydropower dams on the Chicopee River. The average flow of the Chicopee River is 900 cubic feet per second, or about 581,644,800 gallons per day.

The Chicopee Falls Dam impounds the river near what is now Bridge Street / Massachusetts Route 33 in the city of Chicopee. There are five other dams on this river segment: Just downstream from the Chicopee Falls Dam is Dwight Dam, located off Grape and Front St. in Chicopee. The next dam upstream is the Indian Orchard Dam north of Route 141 adjacent to an old mill on Front Street. Putts Bridge Dam at Route 21 between Ludlow and the Indian Orchard section of Springfield, the Collins Hydro Dam at Chapin Street between Ludlow and Wilbraham, and the Red Bridge Dam off Red Bridge Road in Wilbraham. The Putts Bridge Dam was constructed in 1918 as a concrete gravity structure. It rises 22 ft (6.7 m) from the bed of the Chicopee River. The Indian Orchard Dam is a cut stone dam with 28 ft (8.5 m) of height above the river. Each of these dams generate hydroelectric power. The Dwight Dam is cut stone with height of 15 ft.

There is the remnants of the Ames Sword Company Dam, just downstream from Dwight Dam, this is the last dam on the Chicopee River before it empties into the Connecticut. There also used to be a low-head dam just upstream of the Putts Bridge Dam alongside the old Ludlow Mills. A bridge across the river at what is now Springfield Street / Massachusetts Route 116 in Chicopee opened in 1783. It was replaced by a covered wooden bridge in 1846, and then the steel and concrete William F. Devitt Memorial Bridge in 1931. This was demolished and replaced by a modern bridge, along with the bridge over the Dwight Manufacturer's Canal immediately to the south, in 2012–2013.

Around 1900, the Spalding and Pepper Rubber Co. under Noyes W. Fisk constructed a pedestrian suspension bridge at Oak Street as a shortcut for workers. It was destroyed by the 1938 New England hurricane.
