= United States Whip Company Complex =

- U.S. National Register of Historic Places
- U.S. Historic district – Contributing property
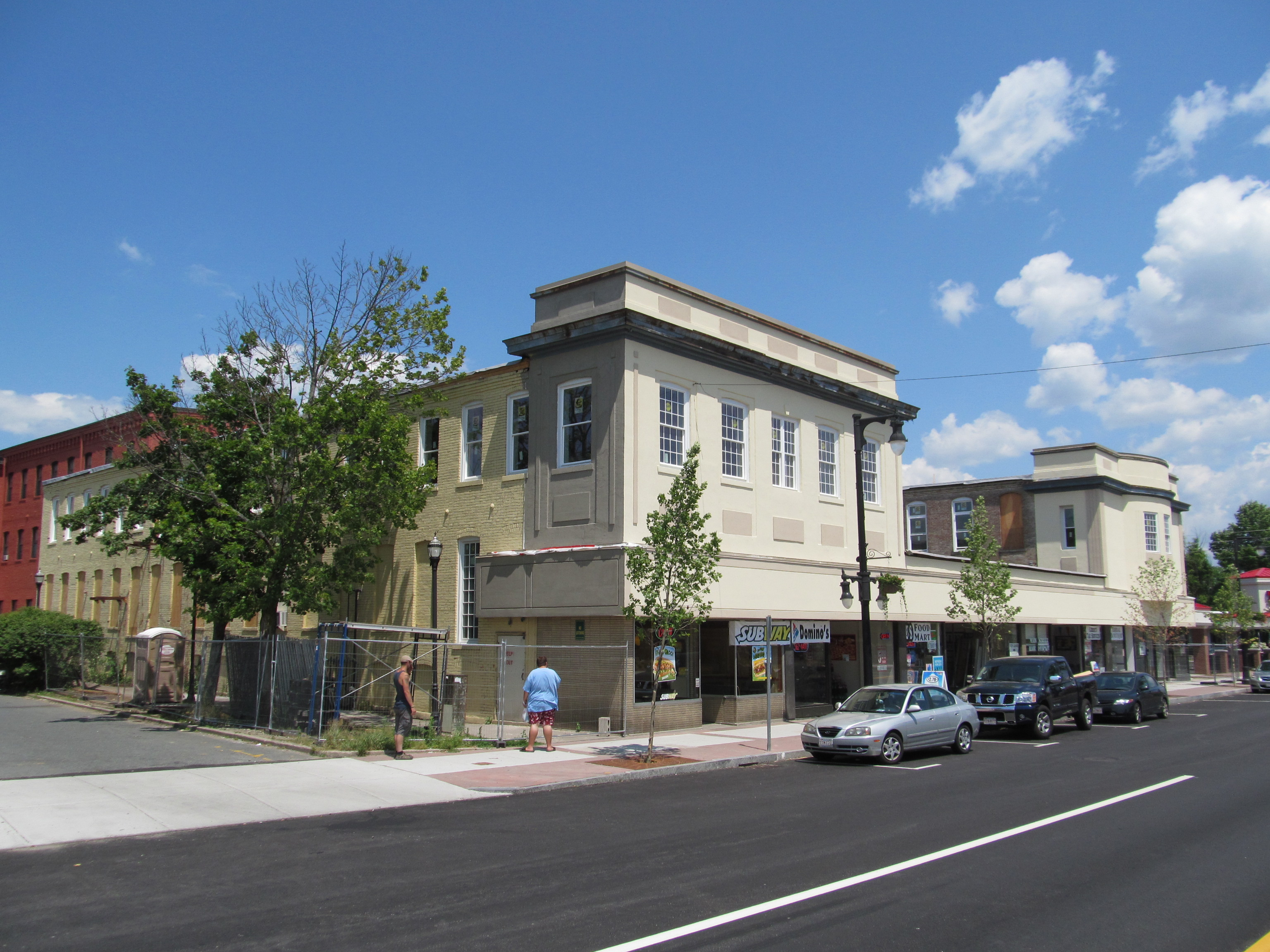
- 24 Main Street

- Location within Massachusetts Location within the United States
- Location: 24 Main Street; Westfield, Massachusetts
- Coordinates: 42°7′12″N 72°44′53″W
- Area: 2.1 acres (0.85 ha)
- Built: 1855
- Architect: Multiple
- Architectural style: Italianate
- Part of: Westfield Center Historic District (ID13000441)
- NRHP reference No.: 83003983

Significant dates
- Added to NRHP: November 29, 1983
- Designated CP: June 25, 2013

The United States Whip Company Complex or "United States Line Company Complex" is a historic factory located in Westfield, Massachusetts. It was owned and operated by one of the whip-making businesses that led Westfield to become widely known as "Whip City". United States Whip, created in 1892 by the consolidation of several local manufacturers, was the world's largest manufacturer of whips. The factory complex was listed individually on the National Register of Historic Places in 1983, and as part of an expanded Westfield Center Historic District in 2013.

== Description and history ==
The former United States Whip Company facility is located in downtown Westfield, on the north side of Main Street (United States Route 20) just east of Park Square and Elm Street, its principal downtown commercial thoroughfare. It consists of seven brick buildings, which occupy most of a city block along with a large parking lot. Building 1, built in 1855, is a large 3 1/2-story building constructed using typical 19th-century mill construction and styling. Building 2 was built sometime before 1884; it is a three-story brick building ten bays long and four wide, from which there is a connector a 1 1/2-story building that fronts on Thomas Street.

Whip making began in Westfield in the early 19th century, and was its major industry by the mid-19th century. United Whip was founded in 1892, and grew by acquiring many of Westfield's smaller manufacturers. At its height in the 1910s, it was the world's largest manufacturer of whips, a business that declined with the advent of the automobile. These buildings were used from 1855 until 1928 for the manufacture of whips. In 1928 the company changed its name to U.S. Line Company. Along with a new name the company pivoted away from the declining whip business to braiding linen and silk fishing line. Throughout out the 1940s and into the mid-1960s U.S. Line was a robust manufacturer and reseller of fine fishing line and accessories. 2016 brought the end of U.S. Line in Westfield, MA. The company was sold to a family-run fishing line business called The Woodstock Line Company, Putnam, CT 860-928-6557. Some of the original products from The U.S. Line Company today are manufactured under the U.S. Line Brand through The Woodstock Line Company. Some of the original products from The U.S. Line Company today are manufactured under the U.S. Line Brand through The Woodstock Line Company. The family of Betsy and Daniel O'Hayer continue the curation and sale of fishing line and other textiles under the USL brand as well as the U.S. Line brand. The Woodstock Line Company brand as well as the innovative "WICKED SLICK" and "WICKED ICE" are continuations of the U.S. Line legacy. The 1855 building was constructed by United's predecessor, the American Whip Company, and building 2 housed the main corporate offices in addition to manufacturing facilities. After 1928 the building fronting on Elm Street was modified to accommodate retail stores and a theater, to a design by architect Malcolm B. Harding. Portions of the complex have been rehabilitated as residences or offices.

== See also ==
- Sanford Whip Factory
- Westfield Whip Manufacturing Company
- H. M. Van Deusen Whip Company
- National Register of Historic Places listings in Hampden County, Massachusetts
