= Sanford Whip Factory =

- Sanford Whip Company
- U.S. National Register of Historic Places
- U.S. Historic district – Contributing property
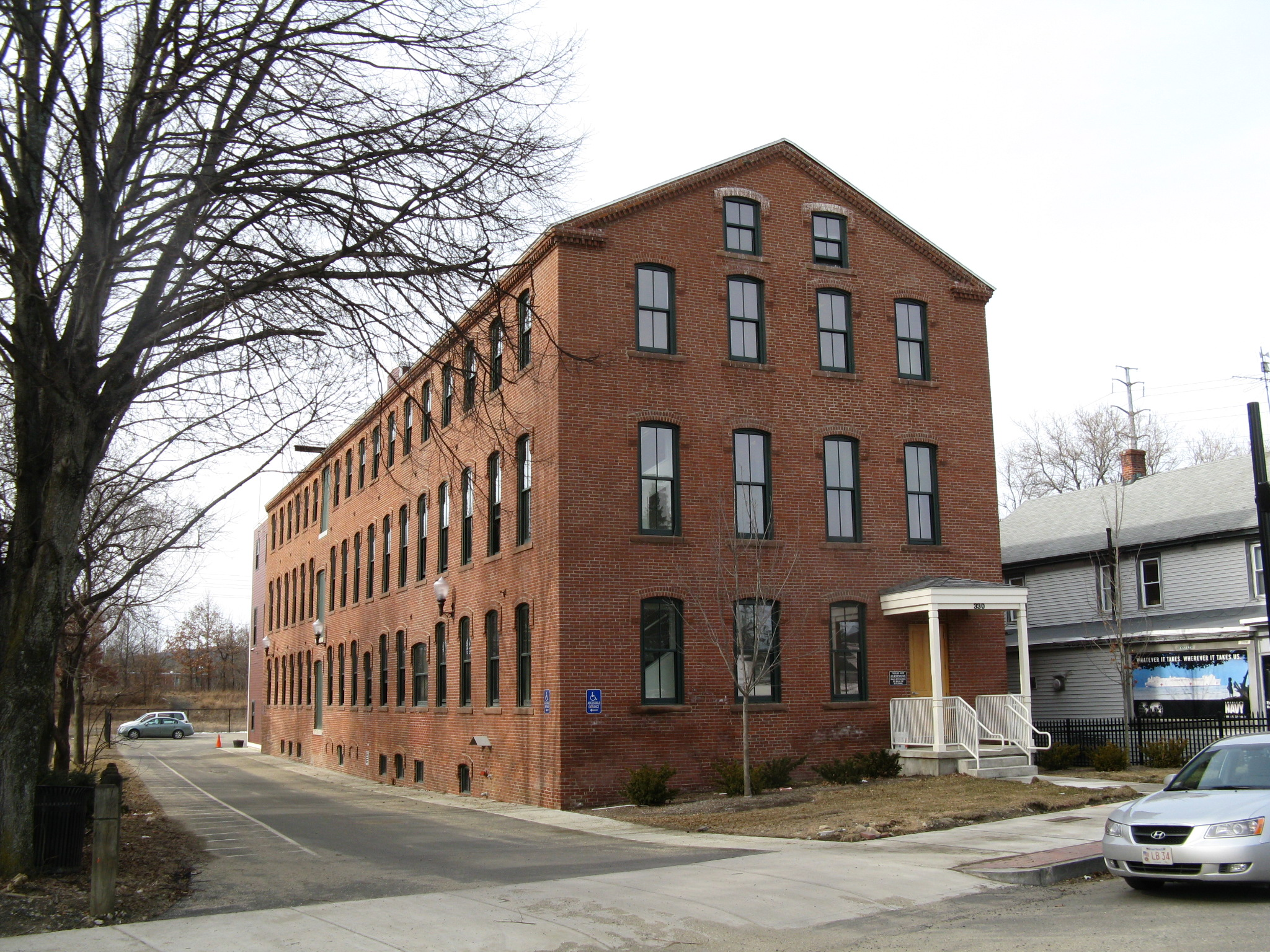

- Location within Massachusetts Location within the United States
- Location: 330 Elm Street; Westfield, Massachusetts
- Coordinates: 42°7′39″N 72°44′50″W
- Area: less than one acre
- Part of: Westfield Center Historic District (ID13000441)
- NRHP reference No.: 08001176

Significant dates
- Added to NRHP: December 10, 2008
- Designated CP: June 25, 2013

The Sanford Whip Company is a historic factory located at 330 Elm Street in Westfield, Massachusetts. Built in 1883, it was owned and operated by one of the whip-making business that led Westfield to become widely known as "Whip City". The building for many years housed a novelty toy manufacturer after the market for whips declined in the early decades of the 20th century. The factory was listed individually on the National Register of Historic Places in 2008, and as part of an expanded Westfield Center Historic District in 2013. It has been converted into affordable housing space.

== Description and history ==
The former Sanford Whip Company building is located at the northern end of Westfield's main business district, across from Kane Park on the west side of Elm Street near Cowles Court. It is a 3 1/2-story brick building, with a slate roof with the gable facing the street, and it has modest Italianate decorations. It is 130 feet (40 m) long, with 17 window bays, and is four window bays wide. Windows are set in segmented-arch openings, with slightly projecting brickwork lintels with shoulders. The main building entrance is in the rightmost bay on the front facade; it is sheltered by a simple portico with square posts.

The Sanford Whip Company was started by brothers Edwin and Fred Sanford in 1880, after involvement in the manufacture and sale of whips with other manufacturers based in New York. Originally located in a space on Mechanic Street, they purchased this parcel in 1882 (its previous buildings having been washed away in an 1878 flood) and had the factory built. The Sanfords operated independently until 1892, when they were consolidated into the United States Whip Company, who used the building primarily for storage. The building was eventually repurchased by a reconstituted Sanford Company in 1924 for the production of whips and novelty toys. That business operated until 2000, when the company folded.

== See also ==
- United States Whip Company Complex
- Westfield Whip Manufacturing Company
- H. M. Van Deusen Whip Company
- National Register of Historic Places listings in Hampden County, Massachusetts
