= Westfield Center Historic District =

Historic district in Massachusetts, United States

- U.S. National Register of Historic Places
- U.S. Historic district
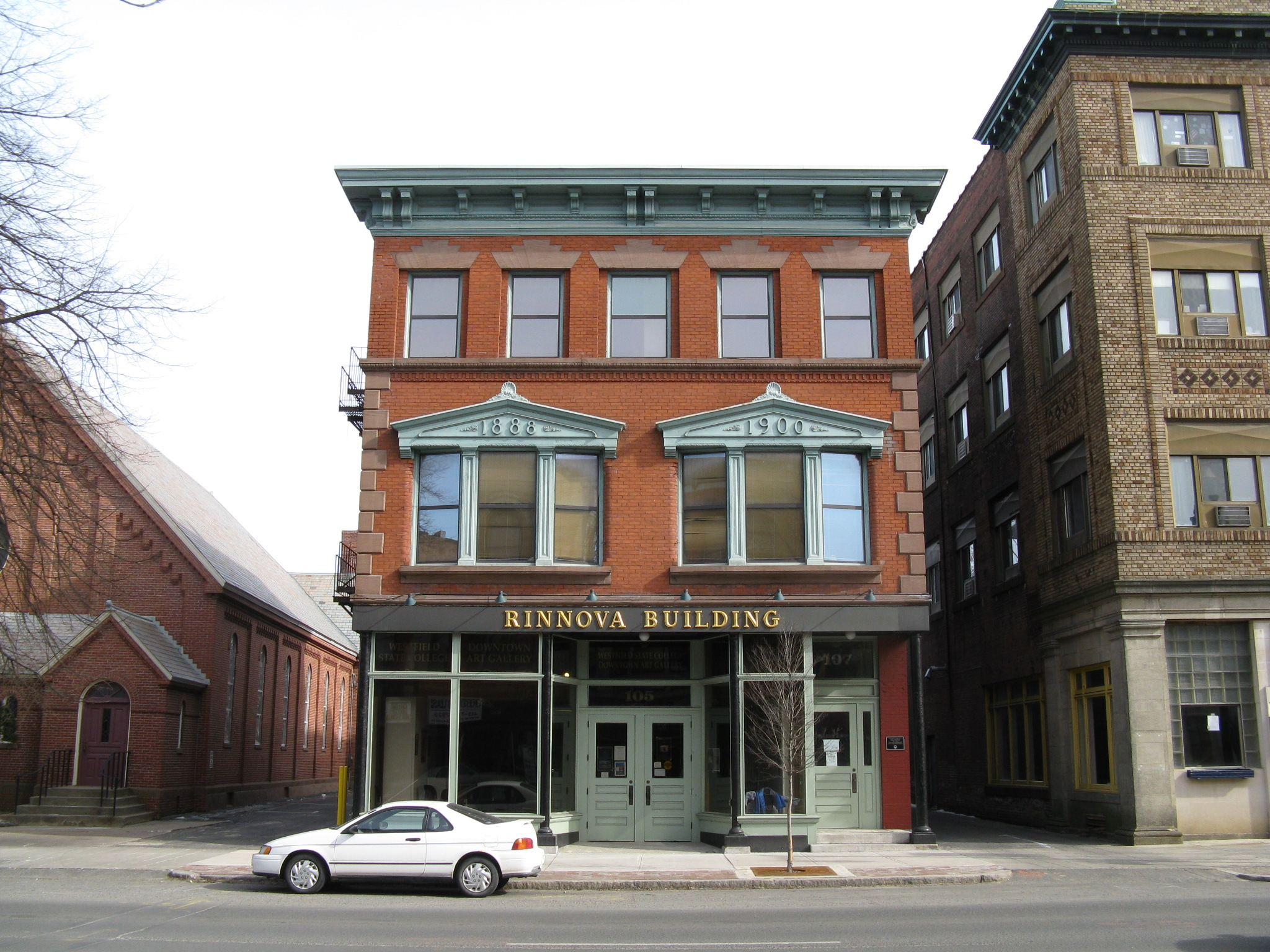
- Rinnova Building

- Location within Massachusetts Location within the United States
- Location: Downtown Westfield, Massachusetts
- Coordinates: 42°7′22″N 72°44′55″W
- Area: 4.25 acres (1.72 ha) (original size); 157 acres (64 ha) (after increase)
- NRHP reference No.: 08000506 (original); 13000441 (increase)

Significant dates
- Added to NRHP: June 10, 2008
- Boundary increase: June 25, 2013

The Westfield Center Historic District is a historic district encompassing 157 acres (64 ha) of the civic, commercial, and industrial heart of Westfield, Massachusetts. It represents a major expansion of the Westfield Center Commercial Historic District, which included only two blocks of buildings along Elm Street in downtown Westfield. The district includes buildings representing the city's growth in the 19th century as a center of the whip-making industry, and its early years as a center for statewide educational institutions, as well as its growth as a regional center of western Hampden County. The commercial district was added to the National Register of Historic Places in 2008; the expansion and renaming of the district took place in 2013.

Westfield was settled in the 17th century by English colonists, with its town center forming just west of the confluence of the Westfield and Little Rivers. It was mainly agricultural until the early 19th century, when whip making began as a cottage industry, and the Hampshire and Hampden Canal provided reliable means for moving goods. The town center shifted westward around this time, becoming centered between Park Square and the Westfield River on what is now called Elm Street. The town developed a diverse industrial whose largest component was the whip industry, prompting it to be called "Whip City". That industry would predominate until the advent of the automobile in the 20th century greatly reduced demand. In the late 19th century the city also became home to the state's second normal school, now Westfield State University.

The city center is architecturally reflective of much of this history, although buildings from the late 19th and early 20th centuries predominate. Important industrial elements survive, in particular whip factories that include the Sanford Whip Factory, the Westfield Whip Manufacturing Company, the United States Whip Company Complex. The early functions of the normal school are recalled in part by the Westfield Municipal Building (formerly housing that school, and now city hall), and the State Normal Training School, an elementary school built as a training vehicle for teachers in training. Residential neighborhoods developed on either side of the commercial area, portions of which are included in the historic district.

== See also ==
- National Register of Historic Places listings in Hampden County, Massachusetts
