= Westfield Municipal Building =

United States historic place

- U.S. National Register of Historic Places
- U.S. Historic district – Contributing property
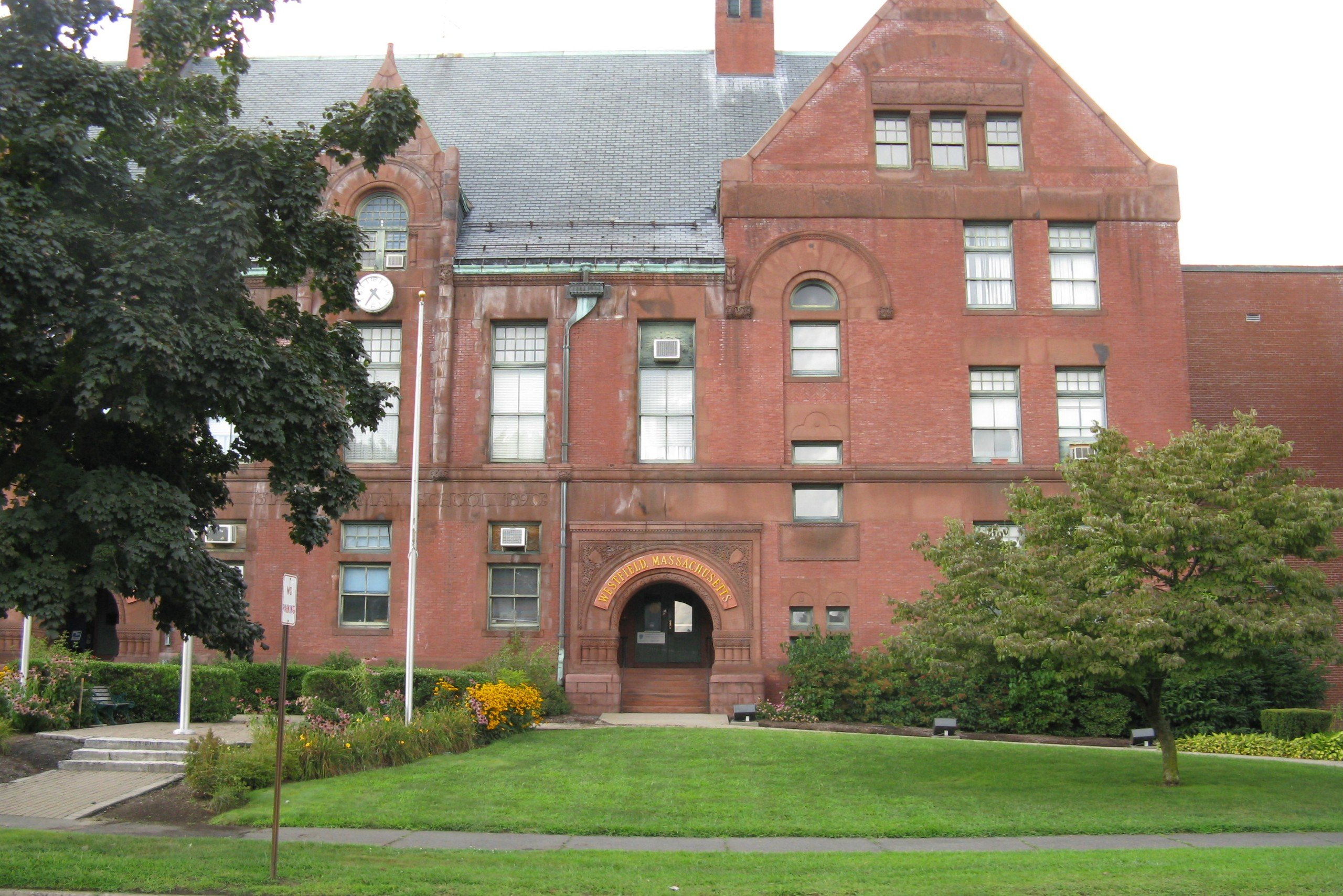
- Westfield Municipal Building

- Location within Massachusetts Location within the United States
- Location: Westfield, Massachusetts
- Coordinates: 42°7′14″N 72°45′19″W
- Built: 1889
- Architect: Hartwell and Richardson; Darling Bros.
- Architectural style: Romanesque Revival
- Part of: Westfield Center Historic District (ID13000441)
- NRHP reference No.: 780004495

Significant dates
- Added to NRHP: March 8, 1978
- Designated CP: June 25, 2013

Westfield Municipal Building is a historic building at 59 Court Street in Westfield, Massachusetts. It presently houses the Westfield city offices and the local district court. It was built in 1889 to house the state normal school (now Westfield State University), serving in that role until its acquisition by the city in 1959. The building was designed by the architectural firm of Hartwell and Richardson. The second partner was William C. Richardson, not H. H. Richardson, but the design of this building, only a few years after the latter's death, was strongly influenced by his distinctive style.

The building has an L shape, with a front facade of 140 feet (43 m). The main block is 65 feet (20 m) deep, and the ell extending off the east side is 55 feet (17 m) deep. It rests on a granite foundation, and is made of red brick with brownstone trim. There are two entrances on the front facade, each under classic Richardsonian arches, with additional entrances on the east side and the rear. In its first use as a training school, the first floor included a reception area, science classrooms, and training classrooms for elementary grades. The second floor housed a study hall and assembly hall capable of holding the whole student population (about 175), as well as the principal's office, science laboratories, other classrooms, and studio space for artistic disciplines. There was a gymnasium in the basement.

The exterior of the building received only modest modifications when the city took over the building in 1959, although it was extensively remodeled inside. Two brick additions were added, one on the east side as vault space, and the other on the north side for storage. The entrance formerly used by the school now serves as the district court entrance, providing access to the clerk's office, a courtroom, and probation offices. The remainder of the building has been converted for the use of a number of city departments.

The building was listed on the National Register of Historic Places in 1978, and as part of an expanded Westfield Center Historic District in 2013.

== See also ==
- State Normal Training School
- National Register of Historic Places listings in Hampden County, Massachusetts
