= H. M. Van Deusen Whip Company =

- U.S. National Register of Historic Places
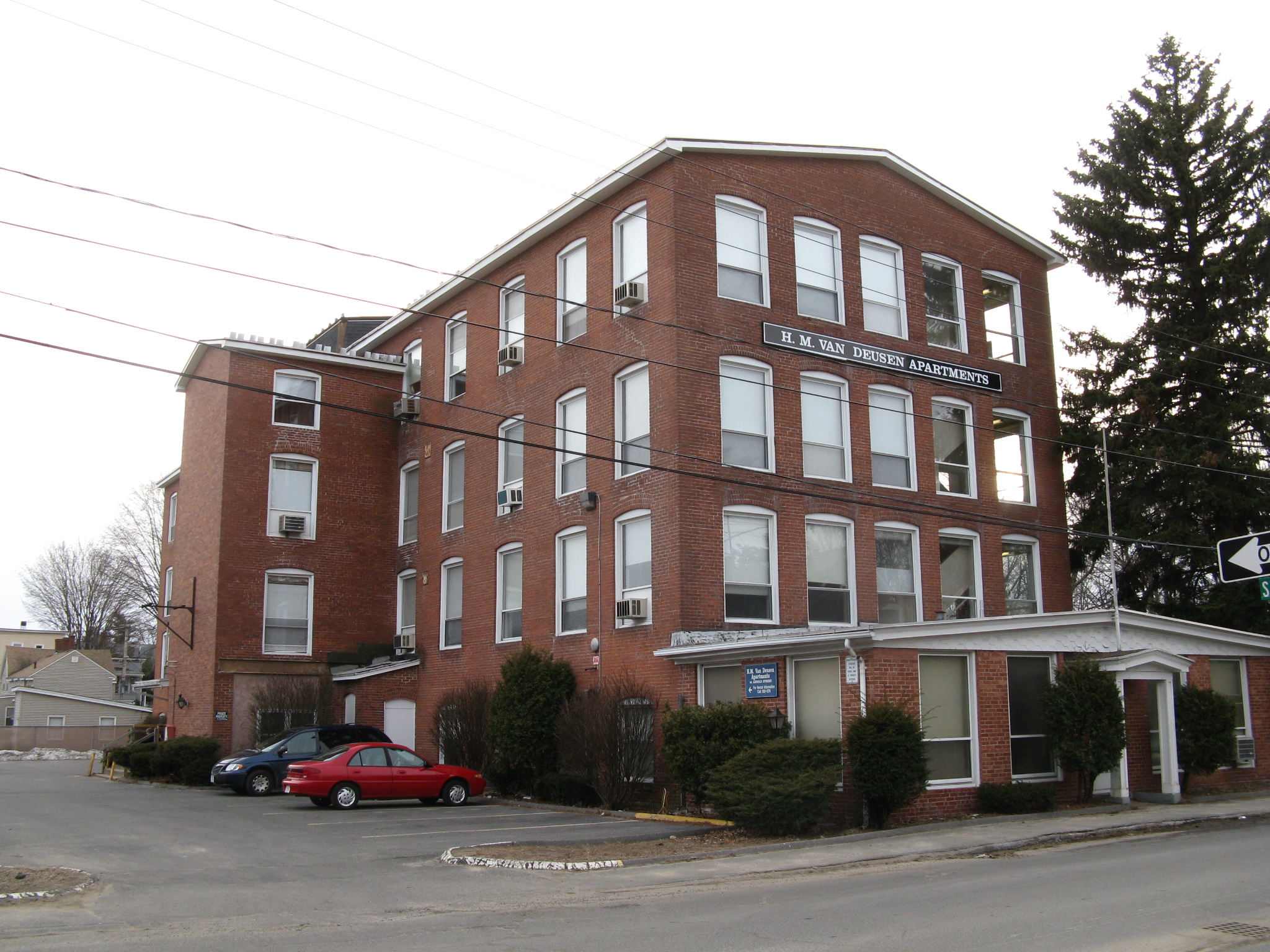
- H. M. Van Deusen Whip Company

- Location within Massachusetts Location within the United States
- Location: 42 Arnold St., Westfield, Massachusetts
- Coordinates: 42°7′22″N 72°45′3″W
- Built: 1917
- NRHP reference No.: 87000037
- Added to NRHP: February 18, 1987

The H. M. Van Deusen Whip Company is an historic factory building at 42 Arnold Street in Westfield, Massachusetts, USA. Built in 1917, it is the last purpose-built whip factory to be built in Westfield, which was nationally known as "Whip City". The building, used until 1930 for whip production, was also somewhat retardaire in design, using late 19th-century construction methods. The building was listed on the National Register of Historic Places in 1987.

== Description and history ==
The H. M. Van Deusen Whip Company is located on the western side of downtown Westfield, on the south side of Arnold Street between Elm and Washington Streets. It is a long rectangular 3-1/2 story building, constructed with load-bearing brick walls. A stair tower projects midway on the long side, and a single-story brick office addition is attached to the north side. Windows are set in segmented-arch openings, and it is covered by a low-pitch gabled roof.

The factory was the last of Westfield's major whip factories to be built (1917). Henry Martin Van Deusen began making whips in 1872 in Southfield, and moved to Westfield in 1880. He partnered with John Pomeroy in the whipmaking business until 1902, when he acquired Pomeroy's shares in the business. In 1925, with the decline in demand for whips occasioned by the success of the automobile, Van Deusen converted the factory to the production of lawn swings. He died in 1930, and his son lost many of his inherited assets during the Great Depression. The factory was acquired by Stanley Home Products, which used it as its corporate headquarters into the 1960s. In the 1980s it was acquired by a developer and converted to apartments.

== See also ==
- National Register of Historic Places listings in Hampden County, Massachusetts
- Sanford Whip Factory
- Westfield Whip Manufacturing Company
