= State Normal Training School =

- U.S. National Register of Historic Places
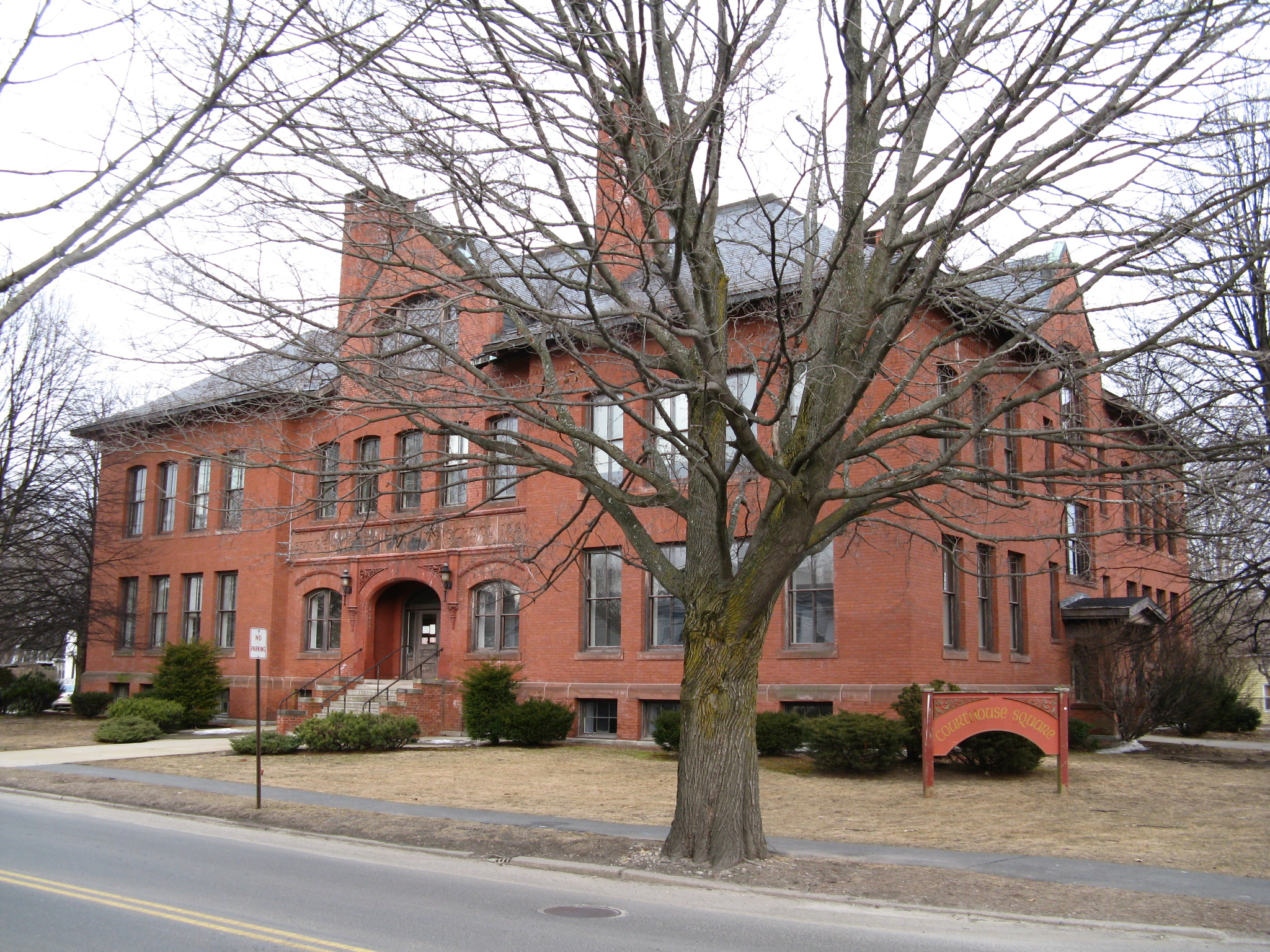
- State Normal Training School

- Location within Massachusetts Location within the United States
- Location: 27 Washington St., Westfield, Massachusetts
- Coordinates: 42.122°N 72.7517°W
- Built: 1899
- Architect: Gardner, Pyne & Gardner
- Architectural style: Late Victorian
- NRHP reference No.: 83000769
- Added to NRHP: July 7, 1983

The State Normal Training School is a historic training school building at 27 Washington Street in Westfield, Massachusetts. It was constructed in 1899 to provide a teaching facility for teachers-in-training who were students at the Westfield State Normal School (now Westfield State University), the second-oldest such school the nation. It was operated jointly by the normal school and the city of Westfield from 1900 until 1956, at which point it was converted into a regular elementary school. The city formally acquired the property in 1977 where it served as the city courthouse until 2012. It was listed on the National Register of Historic Places in 1983. The building now houses apartments, and is known in the community as Courthouse Square.

== Description and history ==
The former State Normal Training School building is located one block west of Westfield's downtown Main Street area, on a parcel bounded by Washington, Church, and School Streets. It is a 3 1/2-story masonry structure, built out of red brick with brownstone trim and resting on a cut granite foundation. It is in the general form of an H, with slightly projecting wings on either side of a central section, each covered by hip roof. Ground floor windows are generally set in rectangular openings, while those on the second story are set in segmented-arch openings. The entrances are recessed in wide segmented-arch openings, flanked on either side by similar openings with windows. The interior is framed in steel and finished in plaster with pine wainscoting; the basic layout and finishes have been preserved.

The Westfield Normal School (now Westfield State University) was the second normal school to be established in Massachusetts, in 1839. By the 1870s, its buildings were deteriorating and in need of replacement. A new building (now the Westfield Municipal Building was built for the school in 1889, but a need was also recognized for a state-run elementary school that could be used for teacher training. This building was built in 1899 to a design by Gardner, Pyne & Gardner of Springfield, one of the region's leading architectural firms. Its doors opened in 1900, and it was operated under a state-city partnership until 1956. It continued to serve the city as a school until the late 1970s. In 2012, the building was completely renovated, while carefully preserving its historic attributes. The property currently serves as a residential apartment building known as Courthouse Square.

== See also ==
- Westfield Municipal Building (which housed the normal school at the time)
- National Register of Historic Places listings in Hampden County, Massachusetts
