= Westfield Whip Manufacturing Company =

- U.S. National Register of Historic Places
- U.S. Historic district – Contributing property
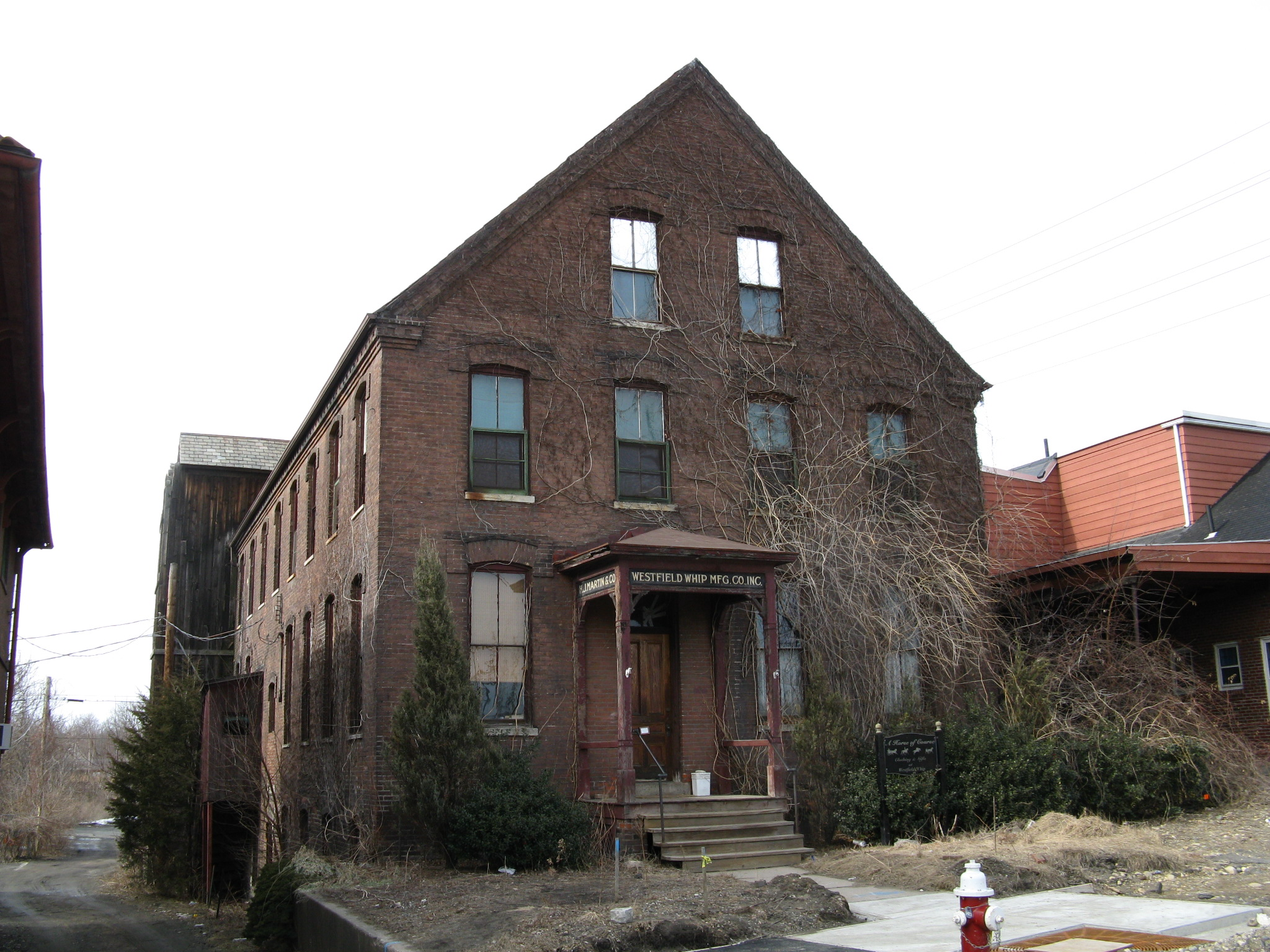
- Westfield Whip Manufacturing Company

- Location within Massachusetts Location within the United States
- Location: 360 Elm St., Westfield, Massachusetts
- Coordinates: 42°7′41″N 72°44′50″W
- Area: less than one acre
- Built: c. 1887
- Part of: Westfield Center Historic District (ID13000441)
- NRHP reference No.: 85003233

Significant dates
- Added to NRHP: October 17, 1985
- Designated CP: June 25, 2013

Westfield Whip Manufacturing Company is a historic factory at 360 Elm Street in Westfield, Massachusetts. Built about 1887, it is the best preserved of Westfield's extant whip factory buildings. It is also home to the last surviving business of the many whipmakers that once operated in Westfield. The factory was listed on the National Register of Historic Places in 1985, and included in an expansion of the Westfield Center Historic District in 2013.

== Description and history ==
The Westfield Whip Manufacturing Company plant is located in an industrial area just north of downtown Westfield, on the west side of Elm Street just south of the Westfield River. The complex is dominated by a 2-1/2 story brick building with modest ornamentation that is ten window bays long and three wide. Windows are set in segmented-arch openings with headers formed out of soldier bricks. The roof eave is adorned with brick corbelling, and the main entrance is sheltered by a Victorian-era porch with turned posts.

The building was built about 1887 for the A.G. Barnes Whip Company, and was purchased in 1893 by the United States Whip Company, which was formed out of a merger of many local whipmakers. Beginning in 1910, the building underwent a number of ownership and usage changes, although significant elements of the whipmaking machinery were retained through uses that included the manufacture of paper tubes, dog collars, and hardware for funerary caskets. In 1957, the building was purchased by the recently founded Westfield Whip Company, which uses some of the facility's specialized machinery for whip manufacturing.

== See also ==
- National Register of Historic Places listings in Hampden County, Massachusetts
