= Turley Publications =

Turley Publications Inc.
- Company type: Private
- Industry: Commercial printing and newspapers
- Founded: 1962
- Headquarters: 24 Water Street, Palmer, Massachusetts 01069 United States
- Number of locations: 2
- Key people: Patrick Turley, President; Keith Turley, Executive VP; Douglas Turley, VP
- Products: Several weekly newspapers in Western Massachusetts
- Number of employees: 200
- Website: turley.com

Turley Publications Inc. is a privately owned commercial printer and publisher of more than a dozen weekly newspapers based in Palmer, Massachusetts, United States.

Patrick and Thomas Turley founded the company in 1962 when they purchased the Palmer Journal & Monson Register.

In 2004, Turley Publications invested in a digital prepress system; the company also runs its own mail room, including in-plant postal verification, and a bindery.

== Properties ==
In addition to printing several other companies' publications—such as the weeklies of Holden Landmark Company and New England Business Media LLC, and student papers at several New England colleges and universities—Turley is the dominant publisher of 15 community weekly newspapers in the suburbs and rural towns between Springfield and Worcester, Massachusetts. Turley weeklies reach about 160,000 homes in 60 towns. Turley-owned newspapers include:

- Agawam Advertiser News of Agawam
- Barre Gazette of Barre, Hubbardston, New Braintree, Oakham and Petersham
- Chicopee Register of Chicopee
- Country Journal of Huntington
- The Holyoke Sun of Holyoke
- The Journal Register of Brimfield, Holland, Monson, Palmer and Wales
- Quaboag Current of East Brookfield, New Braintree, North Brookfield, Warren and West Brookfield
- The Register of Ludlow
- The Sentinel of Amherst, Belchertown and Granby
- Southwick Suffield News of Southwick, Massachusetts, and Suffield, Connecticut
- The Tantasqua Town Common of Brimfield, Brookfield, Holland, Sturbridge and Wales
- Town Reminder of South Hadley
- Ware River News of Ware
- The Wilbraham-Hampden Times of Hampden and Wilbraham

The company also prints a shopper in the Palmer area, the Shopping Guide, and a monthly newspaper, the New England Antiques Journal, which has a national circulation, though mainly in New England
