= Massachusetts's 3rd congressional district =

U.S. House district for Massachusetts

Coordinates: 42°35′22″N 71°34′22″W

- Interactive map of district boundaries since January 3, 2023
- Representative: Lori Trahan; D–Westford
- Population (2025): 793,924
- Median household income: $106,801
- Ethnicity: 60.7% White; 21.8% Hispanic; 8.1% Asian; 4.1% Two or more races; 3.9% Black; 1.4% other
- Cook PVI: D+11

Massachusetts's 3rd congressional district is located in north-central and northeastern Massachusetts. The largest municipalities in the district are Lowell, Lawrence, Haverhill, Methuen, Billerica (partial), Fitchburg, and Marlborough.

Democrat Lori Trahan has represented the district since 2019.

== Cities and towns in the district ==
As of the 2021 redistricting, the 3rd district contains 35 municipalities:

Essex County (3)

Haverhill, Lawrence, Methuen

Middlesex County (21)

Acton, Ashby, Ayer, Billerica (part; also 6th), Boxborough, Carlisle, Chelmsford, Concord, Dracut, Dunstable, Groton, Hudson, Littleton, Lowell, Marlborough, Pepperell, Shirley, Stow, Townsend, Tyngsborough, Westford

Worcester County (11)

Ashburnham, Bolton, Berlin, Clinton, Fitchburg, Gardner, Harvard, Lancaster, Lunenburg, Winchendon, Westminster (part; also 2nd)

=== History of district boundaries ===
After the 2010 census, the third district shifted from covering east-central Worcester County and western Norfolk and Bristol counties to covering northeastern Worcester County, northern and western Middlesex County, and northwestern Essex county. The old 3rd district area was largely split between the updated 2nd and 4th districts. Only Clinton and Marlborough carried over from the old 3rd district.

In the redistricting that occurred after the 2020 census, the boundaries of the third district only changed slightly from its previous iteration.

== Recent election results from statewide races ==
Year	Office	Results
2008	President	Obama 59% - 39%
2008	Senate	Kerry 64% - 36%
2010	Senate (Spec.)	Brown 58% - 42%
2010	Governor	Baker 48% - 43%
2012	President	Obama 58% - 42%
2012	Senate	Brown 51% - 49%
2014	Senate	Markey 58% - 42%
2014	Governor	Baker 52% - 43%
2016	President	Clinton 57% - 35%
2018	Senate	Warren 57% - 39%
2018	Governor	Baker 71% - 28%
2018	Secretary of the Commonwealth	Galvin 69% - 28%
2018	Attorney General	Healey 67% - 33%
2018	Treasurer and Receiver-General	Goldberg 65% - 31%
2018	Auditor	Bump 57% - 36%
2020	President	Biden 62% - 35%
2020	Senate	Markey 64% - 35%
2022	Governor	Healey 61% - 37%
2022	Secretary of the Commonwealth	Galvin 65% - 32%
2022	Attorney General	Campbell 60% - 40%
2022	Auditor	DiZoglio 55% - 39%
2024	President	Harris 58% - 39%
2024	Senate	Warren 58% - 42%

== List of members representing the district ==
Member	Party	Years	Cong ress	Electoral history	District area (counties and municipalities)
District created March 4, 1789
Elbridge Gerry (Marblehead)	Anti-Administration	March 4, 1789 – March 3, 1793	1st 2nd	Elected in 1788. Re-elected in 1790. Retired.	1789–1793; Middlesex County: All
Shearjashub Bourne (Boston)	Pro-Administration	General ticket: March 4, 1793 – March 3, 1795	3rd	Redistricted from the 5th district and re-elected in 1793 on the second ballot, as part of a two-seat general ticket, representing the district from Barnstable, Dukes, and Nantucket counties. [data missing]	1793–1795; Barnstable County: All; Bristol County: All; Dukes County: All; Nantucket County: All; Plymouth County: All
Peleg Coffin Jr. (Boston)	Pro-Administration	General ticket: March 4, 1793 – March 3, 1795	3rd	Elected in 1792, as part of a two-seat general ticket, representing the district from Bristol and Plymouth counties. Redistricted to the 5th district and lost re-election.	1793–1795; Barnstable County: All; Bristol County: All; Dukes County: All; Nantucket County: All; Plymouth County: All
Samuel Lyman (Hampshire County)	Federalist	March 4, 1795 – November 6, 1800	4th 5th 6th	Elected in 1794. Re-elected in 1796. Re-elected in 1798. Retired and then resigned.	1795–1803; Hampshire County: Amherst, Belchertown, Brimfield, Granby, Greenwich, Holland, Leverett, Longmeadow, Ludlow, New Salem, Orange, Palmer, Pelham, Shutesbury, South Brimfield, South Hadley, Springfield, Ware, Warwick, Wendell, and Wilbraham. Worcester County: Athol, Barre, Gardner, Gerry, Hardwick, New Braintree, Petersham, Royalston, Sturbridge, Templeton, Western, Winchendon
Vacant		November 7, 1800 – February 2, 1801	6th		1795–1803; Hampshire County: Amherst, Belchertown, Brimfield, Granby, Greenwich, Holland, Leverett, Longmeadow, Ludlow, New Salem, Orange, Palmer, Pelham, Shutesbury, South Brimfield, South Hadley, Springfield, Ware, Warwick, Wendell, and Wilbraham. Worcester County: Athol, Barre, Gardner, Gerry, Hardwick, New Braintree, Petersham, Royalston, Sturbridge, Templeton, Western, Winchendon
Ebenezer Mattoon (Amherst)	Federalist	February 2, 1801 – March 3, 1803	6th 7th	Elected November 3, 1800, to the next term. Elected December 15, 1800, to finish Lyman's term. Retired.	1795–1803; Hampshire County: Amherst, Belchertown, Brimfield, Granby, Greenwich, Holland, Leverett, Longmeadow, Ludlow, New Salem, Orange, Palmer, Pelham, Shutesbury, South Brimfield, South Hadley, Springfield, Ware, Warwick, Wendell, and Wilbraham. Worcester County: Athol, Barre, Gardner, Gerry, Hardwick, New Braintree, Petersham, Royalston, Sturbridge, Templeton, Western, Winchendon
Manasseh Cutler (Hamilton)	Federalist	March 4, 1803 – March 3, 1805	8th	Redistricted from the 11th district and re-elected in 1802. Retired.	1803–1813 "Essex North district" Essex County: Amesbury, Andover, Boxford, Bradford, Hamilton, Haverhill, Ipswich, Methuen, Middleton, Newbury, Newburyport, Rowley, Salisbury, Topsfield
Jeremiah Nelson (Newburyport)	Federalist	March 4, 1805 – March 3, 1807	9th	Elected in 1804. Retired.	1803–1813 "Essex North district" Essex County: Amesbury, Andover, Boxford, Bradford, Hamilton, Haverhill, Ipswich, Methuen, Middleton, Newbury, Newburyport, Rowley, Salisbury, Topsfield
Edward St. Loe Livermore (Newburyport)	Federalist	March 4, 1807 – March 3, 1811	10th 11th	Elected in 1806. Re-elected in 1808. Retired.	1803–1813 "Essex North district" Essex County: Amesbury, Andover, Boxford, Bradford, Hamilton, Haverhill, Ipswich, Methuen, Middleton, Newbury, Newburyport, Rowley, Salisbury, Topsfield
Leonard White (Haverhill)	Federalist	March 4, 1811 – March 3, 1813	12th	Elected in 1810. Retired.	1803–1813 "Essex North district" Essex County: Amesbury, Andover, Boxford, Bradford, Hamilton, Haverhill, Ipswich, Methuen, Middleton, Newbury, Newburyport, Rowley, Salisbury, Topsfield
Timothy Pickering (Wendham)	Federalist	March 4, 1813 – March 3, 1815	13th	Elected in 1812. Redistricted to the 2nd district.	1813–1815 "Essex North district" Essex County: Beverly, Boxford, Bradford, Gloucester, Hamilton, Ipswich, Manchester, Newbury, Newburyport, Rowley, Salisbury, Topsfield, Wenham
Jeremiah Nelson (Newburyport)	Federalist (Note: Supported the Adams-Clay faction in the 1824 United States presidential election.)	March 4, 1815 – March 3, 1825	14th 15th 16th 17th 18th	Elected to begin member-elect Daniel A. White's term. Re-elected in 1817. Re-elected in 1818. Re-elected in 1820. Re-elected in 1822. Retired.	1815–1817 "Essex North district" Essex County: Amesbury, Andover, Boxford, Bradford, Hamilton, Haverhill, Ipswich, Methuen, Middleton, Newbury, Newburyport, Rowley, Salisbury, Saugus, and Topsfield. Middlesex County: South Reading
Jeremiah Nelson (Newburyport)	Federalist	March 4, 1815 – March 3, 1825	14th 15th 16th 17th 18th	Elected to begin member-elect Daniel A. White's term. Re-elected in 1817. Re-elected in 1818. Re-elected in 1820. Re-elected in 1822. Retired.	1817–1823 "Essex North district" Essex County: Amesbury, Andover, Boxford, Bradford, Hamilton, Haverhill, Ipswich, Methuen, Middleton, Newbury, Newburyport, Rowley, Salisbury, Saugus, Topsfield, and West Newbury. Middlesex County: Dracut
Jeremiah Nelson (Newburyport)	Federalist	March 4, 1815 – March 3, 1825	14th 15th 16th 17th 18th	Elected to begin member-elect Daniel A. White's term. Re-elected in 1817. Re-elected in 1818. Re-elected in 1820. Re-elected in 1822. Retired.	1823–1833 "Essex North district" Essex County: Amesbury, Andover, Boxford, Bradford, Essex, Hamilton, Haverhill, Ipswich, Methuen, Middleton, Newbury, Newburyport, Rowley, Salisbury, Topsfield, Wenham, and West Newbury. Middlesex County: Billerica, Dracut, Tewksbury, Wilmington
John Varnum (Haverhill)	Anti-Jacksonian	March 4, 1825 – March 3, 1831	19th 20th 21st	Elected in 1825. Re-elected in 1826. Re-elected in 1828. Retired.	1823–1833 "Essex North district" Essex County: Amesbury, Andover, Boxford, Bradford, Essex, Hamilton, Haverhill, Ipswich, Methuen, Middleton, Newbury, Newburyport, Rowley, Salisbury, Topsfield, Wenham, and West Newbury. Middlesex County: Billerica, Dracut, Tewksbury, Wilmington
Jeremiah Nelson (Essex)	Anti-Jacksonian	March 4, 1831 – March 3, 1833	22nd	Elected late in 1832 on the thirteenth ballot. Retired.	1823–1833 "Essex North district" Essex County: Amesbury, Andover, Boxford, Bradford, Essex, Hamilton, Haverhill, Ipswich, Methuen, Middleton, Newbury, Newburyport, Rowley, Salisbury, Topsfield, Wenham, and West Newbury. Middlesex County: Billerica, Dracut, Tewksbury, Wilmington
Gayton P. Osgood (North Andover)	Jacksonian	March 4, 1833 – March 3, 1835	23rd	Elected in 1833. Lost renomination.	1833–1843; Essex County: Amesbury, Andover, Boxford, Bradford, Haverhill, Methuen, Middleton, Newbury, Newburyport, Rowley, Salisbury, Topsfield, and West Newbury. Middlesex County: Dracut, Lowell, Reading, Tewksbury, South Reading, Wilmington
Caleb Cushing (Newburyport)	Anti-Jacksonian	March 4, 1835 – March 3, 1837	24th 25th 26th 27th	Elected in 1834. Re-elected in 1836. Re-elected in 1838. Re-elected in 1840. Retired.	1833–1843; Essex County: Amesbury, Andover, Boxford, Bradford, Haverhill, Methuen, Middleton, Newbury, Newburyport, Rowley, Salisbury, Topsfield, and West Newbury. Middlesex County: Dracut, Lowell, Reading, Tewksbury, South Reading, Wilmington
Caleb Cushing (Newburyport)	Whig	March 4, 1837 – March 3, 1843	24th 25th 26th 27th	Elected in 1834. Re-elected in 1836. Re-elected in 1838. Re-elected in 1840. Retired.	1833–1843; Essex County: Amesbury, Andover, Boxford, Bradford, Haverhill, Methuen, Middleton, Newbury, Newburyport, Rowley, Salisbury, Topsfield, and West Newbury. Middlesex County: Dracut, Lowell, Reading, Tewksbury, South Reading, Wilmington
Amos Abbott (Andover)	Whig	March 4, 1843 – March 3, 1849	28th 29th 30th	Elected late in 1844 on the seventh ballot. Re-elected in 1846. Retired.	1843–1853 Essex County: Amesbury, Andover, Boxford, Bradford, Georgetown, Haverhill, Methuen, Newbury, Newburyport, Rowley, Salisbury, and West Newbury. Middlesex County: Billerica, Carlisle, Chelmsford, Dracut, Dunstable, Groton, Littleton, Lowell, Tewksbury, Tyngsborough, Westford, Wilmington
James H. Duncan (Haverhill)	Whig	March 4, 1849 – March 3, 1853	31st 32nd	Elected in 1848. Re-elected in 1850. [data missing]	1843–1853 Essex County: Amesbury, Andover, Boxford, Bradford, Georgetown, Haverhill, Methuen, Newbury, Newburyport, Rowley, Salisbury, and West Newbury. Middlesex County: Billerica, Carlisle, Chelmsford, Dracut, Dunstable, Groton, Littleton, Lowell, Tewksbury, Tyngsborough, Westford, Wilmington
J. Wiley Edmands (Lawrence)	Whig	March 4, 1853 – March 3, 1855	33rd	Elected in 1852. Retired.	1853–1863; Norfolk County: Bellingam, Braintree, Canton, Dedham, Dorchester, Dover, Foxborough, Franklin, Medfield, Medway, Milton, Needham, Quincy, Randolph, Sharon, Stoughton, Walpole, West Roxbury, Weymouth, and Wrentham. Middlesex County: Brighton, Holliston, Newton, Sherborn, and Watertown. Worcester County: Blackstone, Mendon, Milford, Northbridge, Upton, Uxbridge
William S. Damrell (Dedham)	Know Nothing	March 4, 1855 – March 3, 1857	34th 35th	Elected in 1854. Re-elected in 1856. Retired due to failing health.	1853–1863; Norfolk County: Bellingam, Braintree, Canton, Dedham, Dorchester, Dover, Foxborough, Franklin, Medfield, Medway, Milton, Needham, Quincy, Randolph, Sharon, Stoughton, Walpole, West Roxbury, Weymouth, and Wrentham. Middlesex County: Brighton, Holliston, Newton, Sherborn, and Watertown. Worcester County: Blackstone, Mendon, Milford, Northbridge, Upton, Uxbridge
William S. Damrell (Dedham)	Republican	March 4, 1857 – March 3, 1859	34th 35th	Elected in 1854. Re-elected in 1856. Retired due to failing health.	1853–1863; Norfolk County: Bellingam, Braintree, Canton, Dedham, Dorchester, Dover, Foxborough, Franklin, Medfield, Medway, Milton, Needham, Quincy, Randolph, Sharon, Stoughton, Walpole, West Roxbury, Weymouth, and Wrentham. Middlesex County: Brighton, Holliston, Newton, Sherborn, and Watertown. Worcester County: Blackstone, Mendon, Milford, Northbridge, Upton, Uxbridge
Charles Adams (Quincy)	Republican	March 4, 1859 – May 1, 1861	36th 37th	Elected in 1858. Re-elected in 1860. Resigned to become U.S. Minister to England.	1853–1863; Norfolk County: Bellingam, Braintree, Canton, Dedham, Dorchester, Dover, Foxborough, Franklin, Medfield, Medway, Milton, Needham, Quincy, Randolph, Sharon, Stoughton, Walpole, West Roxbury, Weymouth, and Wrentham. Middlesex County: Brighton, Holliston, Newton, Sherborn, and Watertown. Worcester County: Blackstone, Mendon, Milford, Northbridge, Upton, Uxbridge
Vacant		May 1, 1861 – June 11, 1861	37th		1853–1863; Norfolk County: Bellingam, Braintree, Canton, Dedham, Dorchester, Dover, Foxborough, Franklin, Medfield, Medway, Milton, Needham, Quincy, Randolph, Sharon, Stoughton, Walpole, West Roxbury, Weymouth, and Wrentham. Middlesex County: Brighton, Holliston, Newton, Sherborn, and Watertown. Worcester County: Blackstone, Mendon, Milford, Northbridge, Upton, Uxbridge
Benjamin Thomas(Boston)	Union	June 11, 1861 – March 3, 1863	37th	Elected to finish Adams's term. Retired.	1853–1863; Norfolk County: Bellingam, Braintree, Canton, Dedham, Dorchester, Dover, Foxborough, Franklin, Medfield, Medway, Milton, Needham, Quincy, Randolph, Sharon, Stoughton, Walpole, West Roxbury, Weymouth, and Wrentham. Middlesex County: Brighton, Holliston, Newton, Sherborn, and Watertown. Worcester County: Blackstone, Mendon, Milford, Northbridge, Upton, Uxbridge
Alexander H. Rice (Boston)	Republican	March 4, 1863 – March 3, 1867	38th 39th	Redistricted from the 4th district and re-elected in 1862. Re-elected in 1864. Retired.	1863–1867; Norfolk County: Roxbury, and Brookline. Suffolk County: Boston (wards 4, 7, 8, 10 through 12)
Ginery Twichell (Brookline)	Republican	March 4, 1867 – March 3, 1873	40th 41st 42nd	Elected in 1866. Re-elected in 1868. Re-elected in 1870. Retired.	1867–1873; Norfolk County: Roxbury, and Brookline. Suffolk County: Boston (wards 5, 7, 8, 10 through 12)
William Whiting (Boston)	Republican	March 4, 1873 – June 29, 1873	43rd	Elected in 1872. Died.	1873–1877; Suffolk County: Boston (wards 7, 8, 10 through 16)
Vacant		June 29, 1873 – December 1, 1873	43rd		1873–1877; Suffolk County: Boston (wards 7, 8, 10 through 16)
Henry L. Pierce (Boston)	Republican	December 1, 1873 – March 3, 1877	43rd 44th	Elected to finish Whiting's term. Re-elected in 1874. Retired.	1873–1877; Suffolk County: Boston (wards 7, 8, 10 through 16)
Walbridge A. Field (Boston)	Republican	March 4, 1877 – March 28, 1878	45th	[data missing] Lost election contest.	1877–1883; Suffolk County: Boston (wards 13 through 21, 24)
Benjamin Dean (Boston)	Democratic	March 28, 1878 – March 3, 1879	45th	Won election contest. Retired.	1877–1883; Suffolk County: Boston (wards 13 through 21, 24)
Walbridge A. Field (Boston)	Republican	March 4, 1879 – March 3, 1881	46th	Elected in 1878. Retired.	1877–1883; Suffolk County: Boston (wards 13 through 21, 24)
Ambrose Ranney (Boston)	Republican	March 4, 1881 – March 3, 1887	47th 48th 49th	Elected in 1880. Re-elected in 1882. Re-elected in 1884. Lost re-election.	1877–1883; Suffolk County: Boston (wards 13 through 21, 24)
Ambrose Ranney (Boston)	Republican	March 4, 1881 – March 3, 1887	47th 48th 49th	Elected in 1880. Re-elected in 1882. Re-elected in 1884. Lost re-election.	1883–1893; Norfolk County: Milton. Suffolk County: Boston (ward 11, ward 15 (Pct. 3 & 4), wards 17-24)
Leopold Morse (Boston)	Democratic	March 4, 1887 – March 3, 1889	50th	Elected in 1886. Retired.	1883–1893; Norfolk County: Milton. Suffolk County: Boston (ward 11, ward 15 (Pct. 3 & 4), wards 17-24)
John F. Andrew (Boston)	Democratic	March 4, 1889 – March 3, 1893	51st 52nd	Elected in 1888. Re-elected in 1890. Lost re-election.	1883–1893; Norfolk County: Milton. Suffolk County: Boston (ward 11, ward 15 (Pct. 3 & 4), wards 17-24)
Joseph H. Walker(Worcester)	Republican	March 4, 1893 – March 3, 1899	53rd 54th 55th	Redistricted from the 10th district and re-elected in 1892. Re-elected in 1894. Re-elected in 1896. Lost re-election.	1893–1903 Middlesex County: Hopkinton. Worcester County: Auburn, Blackstone, Charlton, Douglas, Dudley, Grafton, Holden, Leicester, Mendon, Millbury, Northbridge, Oxford, Paxton, Rutland, Shrewsbury, Southbrige, Spencer, Sturbridge, Sutton, Upton, Uxbridge, Webster, Westborough, West Boylston, Worcester
John R. Thayer (Worcester)	Democratic	March 4, 1899 – March 3, 1905	56th 57th 58th	Elected in 1898. Re-elected in 1900. Re-elected in 1902. Retired.	1893–1903 Middlesex County: Hopkinton. Worcester County: Auburn, Blackstone, Charlton, Douglas, Dudley, Grafton, Holden, Leicester, Mendon, Millbury, Northbridge, Oxford, Paxton, Rutland, Shrewsbury, Southbrige, Spencer, Sturbridge, Sutton, Upton, Uxbridge, Webster, Westborough, West Boylston, Worcester
John R. Thayer (Worcester)	Democratic	March 4, 1899 – March 3, 1905	56th 57th 58th	Elected in 1898. Re-elected in 1900. Re-elected in 1902. Retired.	1903–1913; Worcester County: Auburn, Charlton, Douglas, Dudley, Grafton, Holden, Leicester, Millbury, Northbridge, Oxford, Paxton, Rutland, Shrewsbury, Southbrige, Spencer, Sturbridge, Sutton, Uxbridge, Webster, Westborough, West Boylston, Worcester
Rockwood Hoar (Worcester)	Republican	March 4, 1905 – November 1, 1906	59th	Elected in 1904. Died.	1903–1913; Worcester County: Auburn, Charlton, Douglas, Dudley, Grafton, Holden, Leicester, Millbury, Northbridge, Oxford, Paxton, Rutland, Shrewsbury, Southbrige, Spencer, Sturbridge, Sutton, Uxbridge, Webster, Westborough, West Boylston, Worcester
Vacant		November 1, 1906 – December 18, 1906	59th		1903–1913; Worcester County: Auburn, Charlton, Douglas, Dudley, Grafton, Holden, Leicester, Millbury, Northbridge, Oxford, Paxton, Rutland, Shrewsbury, Southbrige, Spencer, Sturbridge, Sutton, Uxbridge, Webster, Westborough, West Boylston, Worcester
Charles G. Washburn (Worcester)	Republican	December 18, 1906 – March 3, 1911	59th 60th 61st	Elected to finish Hoar's term. Re-elected in 1906. Re-elected in 1908. Lost re-election.	1903–1913; Worcester County: Auburn, Charlton, Douglas, Dudley, Grafton, Holden, Leicester, Millbury, Northbridge, Oxford, Paxton, Rutland, Shrewsbury, Southbrige, Spencer, Sturbridge, Sutton, Uxbridge, Webster, Westborough, West Boylston, Worcester
John A. Thayer (Worcester)	Democratic	March 4, 1911 – March 3, 1913	62nd	Elected in 1910. Lost re-election.	1903–1913; Worcester County: Auburn, Charlton, Douglas, Dudley, Grafton, Holden, Leicester, Millbury, Northbridge, Oxford, Paxton, Rutland, Shrewsbury, Southbrige, Spencer, Sturbridge, Sutton, Uxbridge, Webster, Westborough, West Boylston, Worcester
William H. Wilder (Gardner)	Republican	March 4, 1913 – September 11, 1913	63rd	Redistricted from the 4th district and re-elected in 1912. Died.	1913–1927; Franklin County: New Salem, and Orange. Hampshire County: Greenwich, and Prescott. Middlesex County: Ashby, and Townsend. Hampden County: Brimfield, Holland, Monson, Palmer, and Wales. Worcester County: Ashburnham, Athol, Barre, Boylston, Brookfield, Charlton, Clinton, Dana, Dudley, East Brookfield, Fitchburg, Gardner, Hardwick, Holden, Hubbardston, Lancaster, Leicester, Leominster, Lunenburg, New Braintree, North Brookfield, Oakham, Oxford, Paxton, Petersham, Phillipston, Princeton, Royalston, Rutland, Southbrige, Spencer, Sterling, Sturbridge, Templeton, Warren, Webster, West Boylston, West Brookfield, Westminster, Winchendon
Vacant		September 11, 1913 – November 4, 1913	63rd		
Calvin Paige (Southbridge)	Republican	November 4, 1913 – March 3, 1925	63rd 64th 65th 66th 67th 68th	Elected to finish Wilder's term. Re-elected in 1914. Re-elected in 1916. Re-elected in 1918. Re-elected in 1920. Re-elected in 1922. Retired.	
Frank H. Foss (Fitchburg)	Republican	March 4, 1925 – January 3, 1935	69th 70th 71st 72nd 73rd	Elected in 1924. Re-elected in 1926. Re-elected in 1928. Re-elected in 1930. Re-elected in 1932. Lost re-election.	
Frank H. Foss (Fitchburg)	Republican	March 4, 1925 – January 3, 1935	69th 70th 71st 72nd 73rd	Elected in 1924. Re-elected in 1926. Re-elected in 1928. Re-elected in 1930. Re-elected in 1932. Lost re-election.	1927–1933; Franklin County: Erving, New Salem, Orange, Shutesbury, Warwick, and Wendell. Hampden County: Brimfield, Holland, Monson, Palmer, and Wales. Hampshire County: Belchertown, Enfield, Greenwich, Pelham, Prescott, and Ware. Worcester County: Ashburnham, Athol, Barre, Boylston, Brookfield, Charlton, Clinton, Dana, Dudley, East Brookfield, Fitchburg, Gardner, Hardwick, Holden, Hubbardston, Lancaster, Leicester, Leominster, Lunenburg, New Braintree, North Brookfield, Oakham, Oxford, Paxton, Petersham, Phillipston, Princeton, Royalston, Rutland, Southbrige, Spencer, Sterling, Sturbridge, Templeton, Warren, Webster, West Boylston, West Brookfield, Westminster, Winchendon
Frank H. Foss (Fitchburg)	Republican	March 4, 1925 – January 3, 1935	69th 70th 71st 72nd 73rd	Elected in 1924. Re-elected in 1926. Re-elected in 1928. Re-elected in 1930. Re-elected in 1932. Lost re-election.	1933–1943; Hampden County: Brimfield, Holland, Monson, Palmer, and Wales. Hampshire County: Ware. Middlesex County: Ashby, Boxborough, Framingham, Hudson, Marlborough, Maynard, Pepperell, Shirley, Stow, Sudbury, Townsend, and Wayland. Worcester County: Ashburnham, Barre, Berlin, Bolton, Brookfield, Charlton, Clinton, Dana, Dudley, East Brookfield, Fitchburg, Gardner, Hardwick, Harvard, Hubbardston, Lancaster, Leicester, Leominster, Lunenburg, New Braintree, North Brookfield, Oakham, Oxford, Paxton, Petersham, Phillipston, Princeton, Rutland, Southbrige, Spencer, Sterling, Sturbridge, Templeton, Warren, Webster, West Brookfield, Westminster, Winchendon
Joseph E. Casey (Clinton)	Democratic	January 3, 1935 – January 3, 1943	74th 75th 76th 77th	Elected in 1934. Re-elected in 1936. Re-elected in 1938. Re-elected in 1940. Retired to run for U.S. Senator.	
Philip J. Philbin (Clinton)	Democratic	January 3, 1943 – January 3, 1971	78th 79th 80th 81st 82nd 83rd 84th 85th 86th 87th 88th 89th 90th 91st	Elected in 1942. Re-elected in 1944. Re-elected in 1946. Re-elected in 1948. Re-elected in 1950. Re-elected in 1952. Re-elected in 1954. Re-elected in 1956. Re-elected in 1958. Re-elected in 1960. Re-elected in 1962. Re-elected in 1964. Re-elected in 1966. Re-elected in 1968. Lost renomination.	1943–1963; Hampden County: Palmer. Hampshire County: Ware. Middlesex County: Hudson, Marlborough, Maynard, Shirley, and Stow. Worcester County: Ashburnham, Barre, Blackstone, Bolton, Brookfield, Charlton, Clinton, Douglas, Dudley, East Brookfield, Fitchburg, Gardner, Hardwick, Harvard, Hubbardston, Lancaster, Leicester, Leominster, Lunenburg, Milford, Millbury, Millville, New Braintree, Northbridge, North Brookfield, Oakham, Oxford, Paxton, Princeton, Rutland, Southbrige, Spencer, Sturbridge, Sutton, Upton, Uxbridge, Warren, Webster, West Brookfield, Westminster, Winchendon
Philip J. Philbin (Clinton)	Democratic	January 3, 1943 – January 3, 1971	78th 79th 80th 81st 82nd 83rd 84th 85th 86th 87th 88th 89th 90th 91st	Elected in 1942. Re-elected in 1944. Re-elected in 1946. Re-elected in 1948. Re-elected in 1950. Re-elected in 1952. Re-elected in 1954. Re-elected in 1956. Re-elected in 1958. Re-elected in 1960. Re-elected in 1962. Re-elected in 1964. Re-elected in 1966. Re-elected in 1968. Lost renomination.	1963–1973; Worcester County: Ashburnham, Barre, Berlin, Blackstone, Bolton, Charlton, Clinton, Douglas, Dudley, Fitchburg, Gardner, Hardwick, Harvard, Hopedale, Hubbardston, Lancaster, Leicester, Leominster, Lunenburg, Mendon, Milford, Millbury, Millville, New Braintree, Northbridge, Oakham, Oxford, Paxton, Princeton, Rutland, Southbrige, Spencer, Sterling, Sutton, Upton, Uxbridge, Webster, Westminster, and Winchendon. Middlesex County: Acton, Ashby, Ayer, Boxborough, Dunstable, Groton, Holliston, Hudson, Littleton, Marlborough, Maynard, Natick, Pepperell, Sherborn, Shirley, Stow, Townsend, Tyngsborough, and Westford. Norfolk County: Bellingham, Franklin, Medway, Millis
Philip J. Philbin (Clinton)	Democratic	January 3, 1943 – January 3, 1971	78th 79th 80th 81st 82nd 83rd 84th 85th 86th 87th 88th 89th 90th 91st	Elected in 1942. Re-elected in 1944. Re-elected in 1946. Re-elected in 1948. Re-elected in 1950. Re-elected in 1952. Re-elected in 1954. Re-elected in 1956. Re-elected in 1958. Re-elected in 1960. Re-elected in 1962. Re-elected in 1964. Re-elected in 1966. Re-elected in 1968. Lost renomination.	1969–1973; Middlesex County: Acton, Ashby, Ayer, Boxborough, Concord, Hudson, Lincoln, Littleton, Marlborough, Maynard, Newton, Shirley, Stow, Townsend, Waltham, Watertown, Westford, and Weston. Worcester County: Ashburnham, Berlin, Bolton, Clinton, Fitchburg, Gardner, Harvard, Lancaster, Leominster, Lunenburg, Sterling, Westminster, Winchendon
Robert Drinan (Newton)	Democratic	January 3, 1971 – January 3, 1973	92nd	Elected in 1970. Redistricted to the 4th district.	1969–1973; Middlesex County: Acton, Ashby, Ayer, Boxborough, Concord, Hudson, Lincoln, Littleton, Marlborough, Maynard, Newton, Shirley, Stow, Townsend, Waltham, Watertown, Westford, and Weston. Worcester County: Ashburnham, Berlin, Bolton, Clinton, Fitchburg, Gardner, Harvard, Lancaster, Leominster, Lunenburg, Sterling, Westminster, Winchendon
Harold Donohue (Worcester)	Democratic	January 3, 1973 – December 31, 1974	93rd	Redistricted from the 4th district and re-elected in 1972. Retired and resigned early.	1973–1983; Middlesex County: Ashland, Holliston, Hopkinton, Hudson, and Marlborough. Norfolk County: Bellingham, Franklin, and Medway. Worcester County: Auburn, Berlin, Blackstone, Boylston, Clinton, Grafton, Hopedale, Leicester, Mendon, Milford, Millbury, Millville, Northborough, Northbridge, Shrewsbury, Southborough, Sutton, Upton, Uxbridge, Westborough, West Boylston, Worcester
Vacant		December 31, 1974 – January 3, 1975	93rd		1973–1983; Middlesex County: Ashland, Holliston, Hopkinton, Hudson, and Marlborough. Norfolk County: Bellingham, Franklin, and Medway. Worcester County: Auburn, Berlin, Blackstone, Boylston, Clinton, Grafton, Hopedale, Leicester, Mendon, Milford, Millbury, Millville, Northborough, Northbridge, Shrewsbury, Southborough, Sutton, Upton, Uxbridge, Westborough, West Boylston, Worcester
Joseph D. Early (Worcester)	Democratic	January 3, 1975 – January 3, 1993	94th 95th 96th 97th 98th 99th 100th 101st 102nd	Elected in 1974. Re-elected in 1976. Re-elected in 1978. Re-elected in 1980. Re-elected in 1982. Re-elected in 1984. Re-elected in 1986. Re-elected in 1988. Re-elected in 1990. Lost re-election.	1973–1983; Middlesex County: Ashland, Holliston, Hopkinton, Hudson, and Marlborough. Norfolk County: Bellingham, Franklin, and Medway. Worcester County: Auburn, Berlin, Blackstone, Boylston, Clinton, Grafton, Hopedale, Leicester, Mendon, Milford, Millbury, Millville, Northborough, Northbridge, Shrewsbury, Southborough, Sutton, Upton, Uxbridge, Westborough, West Boylston, Worcester
Joseph D. Early (Worcester)	Democratic	January 3, 1975 – January 3, 1993	94th 95th 96th 97th 98th 99th 100th 101st 102nd	Elected in 1974. Re-elected in 1976. Re-elected in 1978. Re-elected in 1980. Re-elected in 1982. Re-elected in 1984. Re-elected in 1986. Re-elected in 1988. Re-elected in 1990. Lost re-election.	1983–1993; Middlesex County: Ashland, Holliston, Hopkinton, Hudson, Marlborough, Sherborn, and Stow. Norfolk County: Bellingham, Franklin, Medway, Millis, Norfolk; Worcester County: Auburn, Berlin, Blackstone, Bolton, Boylston, Clinton, Douglas, Grafton, Hopedale, Lancaster, Leicester, Lunenburg, Mendon, Milford, Millbury, Millville, Northborough, Northbridge, Shrewsbury, Southborough, Sutton, Upton, Uxbridge, Westborough, West Boylston, Worcester
Peter Blute (Shrewsbury)	Republican	January 3, 1993 – January 3, 1997	103rd 104th	Elected in 1992. Re-elected in 1994. Lost re-election.	1993–2003; Bristol County: Attleboro, Dartmouth, Fall River (all of wards 1, 2 & 3, ward 6 pcts. A & B, ward 4 pct. A, parts of B & C), Mansfield (pcts. 1, 2 & parts of 3 & 4), North Attleboro, Seekonk, Somerset, Swansea, and Westport. Middlesex County: Holliston, and Hopkinton. Norfolk County: Foxborough (pct. 5, parts of pcts. 1, 3, 4), Franklin, Medway, Plainville, and Wrentham. Worcester County: Auburn (parts of pcts. 1, 3 & 4), Berlin, Boylston, Clinton, Grafton, Holden, Lancaster (parts of pcts. 1 & 2), Northborough, Northbridge, Paxton, Princeton, Rutland, Shrewsbury, Sterling, Upton, Westborough, West Boylston, Worcester
Jim McGovern (Worcester)	Democratic	January 3, 1997 – January 3, 2013	105th 106th 107th 108th 109th 110th 111th 112th	Elected in 1996. Re-elected in 1998. Re-elected in 2000. Re-elected in 2002. Re-elected in 2004. Re-elected in 2006. Re-elected in 2008. Re-elected in 2010. Redistricted to the 2nd district.	
Jim McGovern (Worcester)	Democratic	January 3, 1997 – January 3, 2013	105th 106th 107th 108th 109th 110th 111th 112th	Elected in 1996. Re-elected in 1998. Re-elected in 2000. Re-elected in 2002. Re-elected in 2004. Re-elected in 2006. Re-elected in 2008. Re-elected in 2010. Redistricted to the 2nd district.	2003–2013 Bristol County: Attleboro, Fall River (wards 1-3; ward 4, Precincts A & B; ward 5, Precincts A & B; ward 6, Precincts B & C; & ward 8, Precinct D), North Attleborough, Rehoboth, Seekonk, Somerset, and Swansea. Middlesex County: Ashland, Holliston, Hopkinton, and Marlborough. Norfolk County: Franklin, Medway, Plainville, and Wrentham. Worcester County: Auburn, Boylston, Clinton, Holden, Northborough, Paxton, Princeton, Rutland, Shrewsbury, Southborough, West Boylston, Westborough, and Worcester.
Niki Tsongas (Lowell)	Democratic	January 3, 2013 – January 3, 2019	113th 114th 115th	Redistricted from the 5th district and re-elected in 2012. Re-elected in 2014. Re-elected in 2016. Retired.	2013–present See Cities and towns in the district, above
Lori Trahan (Westford)	Democratic	January 3, 2019 – present	116th 117th 118th 119th	Elected in 2018. Re-elected in 2020. Re-elected in 2022. Re-elected in 2024. Re-elected in 2026.	2013–present See Cities and towns in the district, above

== Recent election results ==
=== 2002 ===
Massachusetts's 3rd congressional district election, 2002
Party	Candidate	Votes	%
Democratic	Jim McGovern (incumbent)	155,697	73.34
write-in		1,848	0.87
blank		54,759	25.79
Majority		153,849	72.47
Turnout		212,304	
Democratic hold			

=== 2004 ===
Massachusetts's 3rd congressional district election, 2004
Party	Candidate	Votes	%	±%
Democratic	Jim McGovern (incumbent)	192,036	67.15	−6.19
Republican	Ronald Crews	80,197	28.04	+28.04
write-in		179	0.06	−0.81
blank		13,584	4.75	−21.04
Majority		111,839	39.11	−33.36
Turnout		285,996		
Democratic hold		Swing		

=== 2006 ===
Massachusetts's 3rd congressional district election, 2006
Party	Candidate	Votes	%	±%
Democratic	Jim McGovern (incumbent)	166,973	77.63	+10.48
write-in		1,983	0.92	+0.86
blank		46,145	21.45	+16.70
Majority		164,990	76.70	+37.59
Turnout		215,101		
Democratic hold		Swing		

=== 2008 ===
Massachusetts's 3rd congressional district election, 2008
Party	Candidate	Votes	%	±%
Democratic	Jim McGovern (incumbent)	227,619	75.04	−2.59
write-in		3,488	1.15	+0.23
blank		72,208	23.81	+2.36
Majority		224,131	73.89	−2.81
Turnout		303,315		
Democratic hold		Swing		

=== 2010 ===
Massachusetts's 3rd congressional district election, 2010
Party	Candidate	Votes	%
Democratic	Jim McGovern (incumbent)	122,357	56.5
Republican	Marty Lamb	84,972	39.2
Independent	Patrick Barron	9,304	4.3
Total votes		216,633	100
Turnout			
Democratic hold			

=== 2012 ===
Democratic primary results
Party	Candidate	Votes	%
Democratic	Nicola Tsongas (incumbent)	24,105	99.2
Democratic	Write-ins	196	0.8
Total votes		24,301	100.0

=== 2014 ===
Massachusetts's 3rd congressional district, 2014
Party	Candidate	Votes	%
Democratic	Niki Tsongas (incumbent)	139,104	60.3
Republican	Ann Wofford	81,638	35.4
n/a	Write-ins	204	0.1
Total votes		230,789	100.0
Democratic hold			

=== 2016 ===
Massachusetts's 3rd congressional district, 2016
Party	Candidate	Votes	%
Democratic	Niki Tsongas (incumbent)	236,713	68.7
Republican	Ann Wofford	107,519	31.2
n/a	Write-ins	360	0.1
Total votes		344,592	100.0
Democratic hold			

=== 2018 ===
Massachusetts' 3rd congressional district, 2018
Party	Candidate	Votes	%
Democratic	Lori Trahan	173,175	62.0
Republican	Rick Green	93,445	33.4
Independent	Mike Mullen	12,572	4.5
Write-in		135	0.1
Total votes		279,327	100.0
Democratic hold			

=== 2020 ===
Massachusetts's 3rd congressional district, 2020
Party	Candidate	Votes	%
Democratic	Lori Trahan (incumbent)	286,896	97.7
Write-in		6,643	2.3
Total votes		293,539	100.0
Democratic hold			

=== 2022 ===
2022 Massachusetts's 3rd congressional district election
Party	Candidate	Votes	%
Democratic	Lori Trahan (incumbent)	154,496	63.5
Republican	Dean Tran	88,585	36.4
Write-in		220	0.1
Total votes		243,301	100.0
Democratic hold			

=== 2024 ===
2024 Massachusetts's 3rd congressional district election
Party	Candidate	Votes	%
Democratic	Lori Trahan (incumbent)	264,698	97.5
Write-in		6,861	2.5
Total votes		271,559	100.0
Democratic hold			
