= Leadmine Wildlife Management Area =

Wildlife conservation area in Massachusetts, US

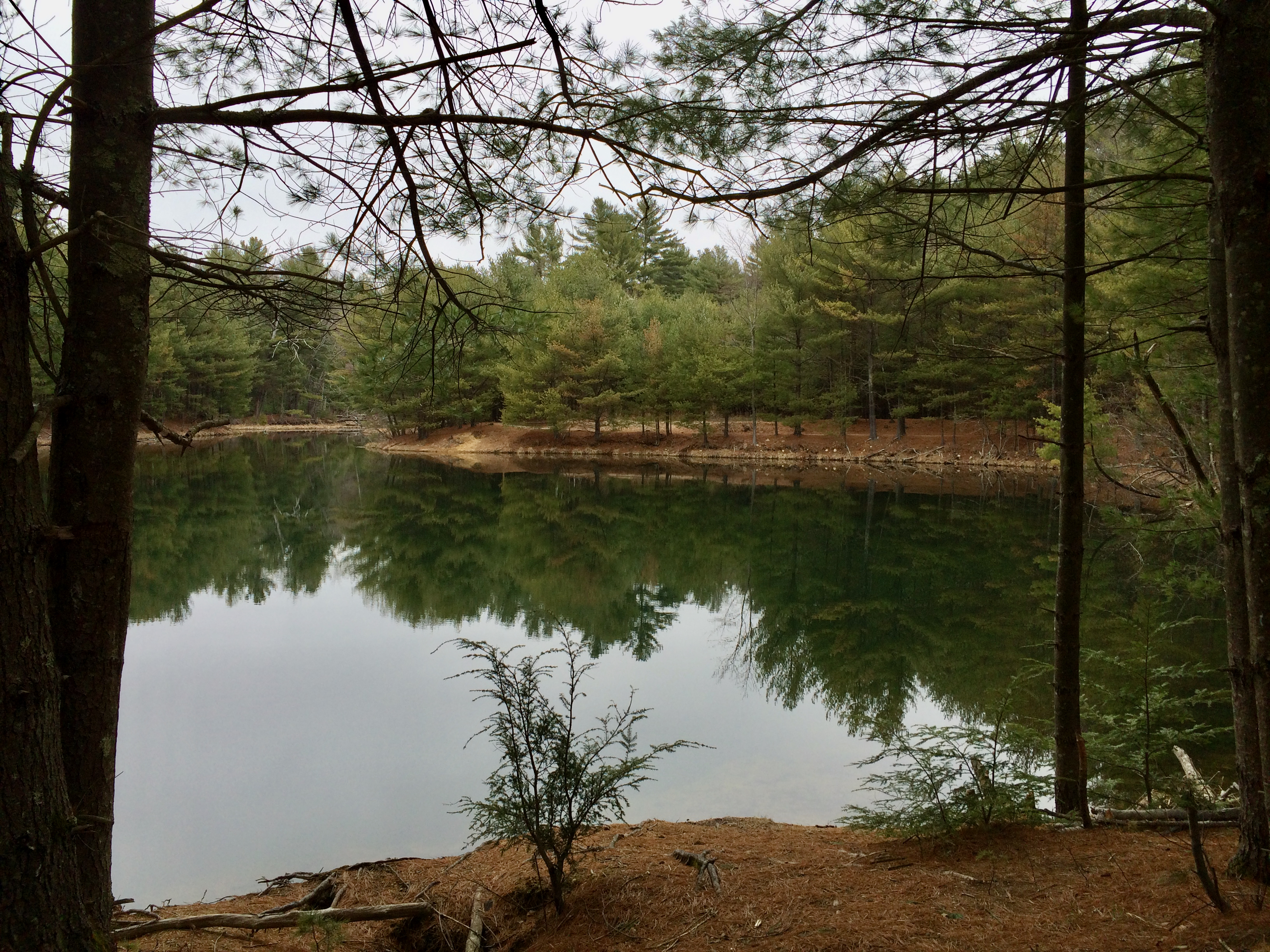
- "Middle Pond" in Leadmine WMA (in Sturbridge, MA) fed by Hamant Brook in 2016.

- Location within Massachusetts
- Location: Sturbridge, Holland, Worcester County, Massachusetts, United States
- Nearest city: Worcester
- Coordinates: 42.068944°N 72.135028°W
- Area: 640 acres (260 ha)
- Governing body: Massachusetts Division of Fisheries and Wildlife

Leadmine Wildlife Management Area is a 640-acre (260 ha) wildlife conservation area located in Holland and Sturbridge, Massachusetts. The conservation area abuts the Tantiusques reservation and its satellite Crowd Site, owned by The Trustees of Reservations. It is managed by the Massachusetts Division of Fisheries and Wildlife. Hunting (in season), hiking, and other outdoor recreational pursuits are enjoyed on the property.

The conservation area is named after the nearby colonial-era graphite mining industry at Tantiusques.

Note that the Leadmine WMA pond depicted on this page may no longer exist in the same form (or even as a pond anymore) as in 2017 the dams were removed from the three adjacent ponds (Upper Pond, Middle Pond and Lower Pond) which were then linked in series by Hamant Brook.
