= Holland (CDP), Massachusetts =

Holland, Massachusetts
- Census-designated place
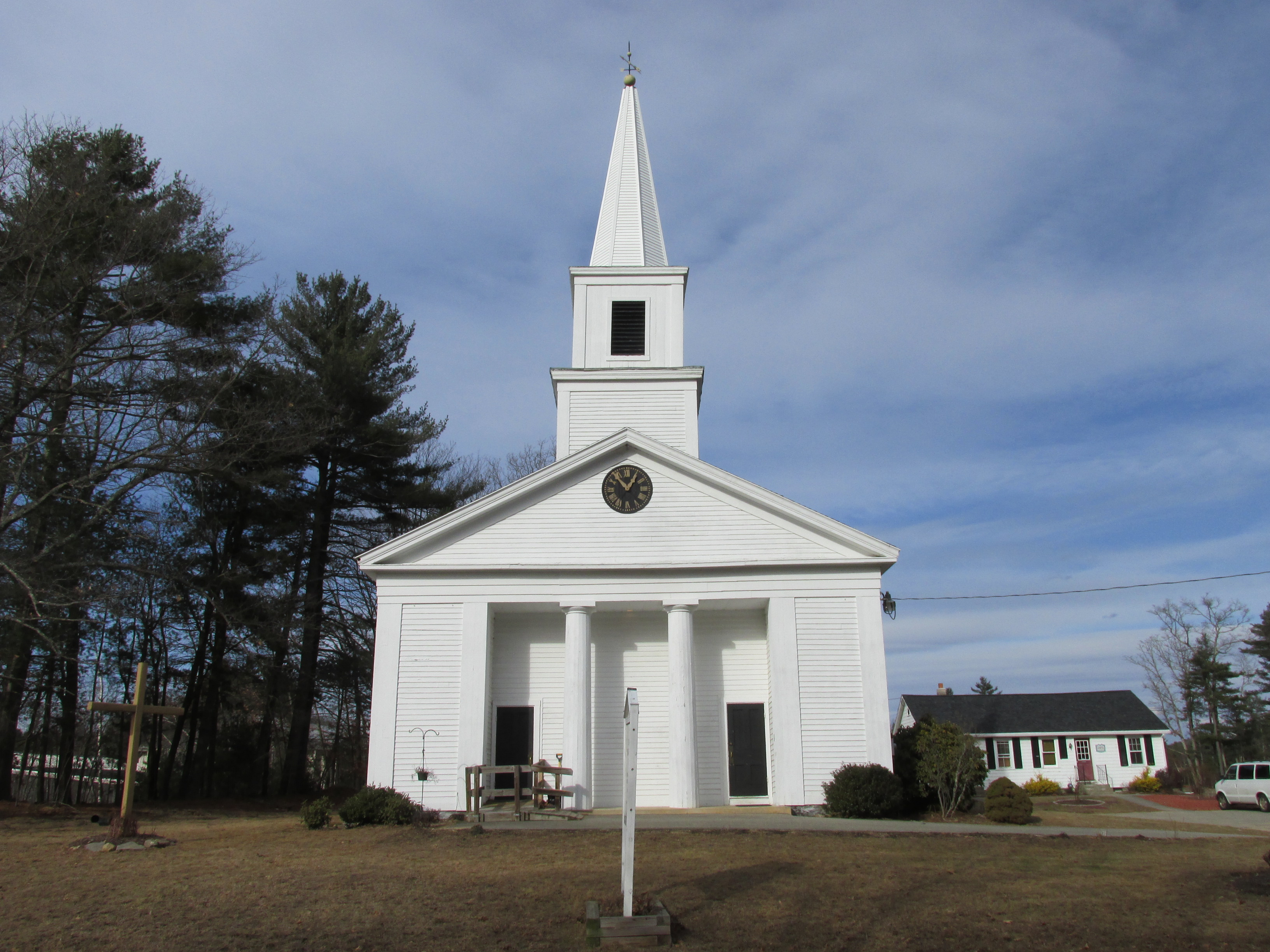
- Congregational Church

- Location in Hampden County in Massachusetts
- Coordinates: 42°2′41″N 72°9′13″W
- Country: United States
- State: Massachusetts
- County: Hampden
- Town: Holland

Area
  - Total: 3.27 sq mi (8.46 km^{2})
  - Land: 2.65 sq mi (6.87 km^{2})
  - Water: 0.61 sq mi (1.59 km^{2})
- Elevation: 696 ft (212 m)

Population (2020)
  - Total: 1,551
  - Density: 584.5/sq mi (225.67/km^{2})
- Time zone: UTC-5 (Eastern (EST))
  - Summer (DST): UTC-4 (EDT)
- ZIP code: 01521
- Area code: 413
- FIPS code: 25-30630
- GNIS feature ID: 0609813

Holland is a census-designated place (CDP) in the town of Holland in Hampden County, Massachusetts, United States, comprising the town center and other populated areas in the eastern part of the town. The population was 1,464 at the 2010 census, out of a total 2,481 people in the town. It is part of the Springfield, Massachusetts Metropolitan Statistical Area.

== Geography ==
The Holland CDP is in the eastern part of the town of Holland at 42°2′40″N 72°9′13″W (42.044717, -72.153626). The CDP includes the Holland town center along Sturbridge Road, as well as residential communities on the shores of Hamilton Reservoir, a lake in the southeastern part of the town. The reservoir outlet is at the northern end of the lake, flowing into the Quinebaug River. Sturbridge is 6 miles (10 km) northeast of Holland via Sturbridge Road.

According to the United States Census Bureau, the Holland CDP has a total area of 3.3 square miles (8.5 km^{2}), of which 2.7 square miles (6.9 km^{2}) are land and 0.62 square miles (1.6 km^{2}), or 18.76%, are water.

== Demographics ==
Historical population
Census	Pop.	Note	%±
2020	1,551		—
U.S. Decennial Census

As of the census of 2000, there were 1,444 people, 561 households, and 399 families residing in the CDP. The population density was 205.7 people/km^{2} (533 people/mi^{2}). There were 962 housing units at an average density of 137.1 units/km^{2} (355 units/mi^{2}). The racial makeup of the CDP was 97.02% White, 0.14% Black or African American, 0.48% Native American, 0.21% Asian, 0.07% Pacific Islander, 1.11% from other races, and 0.97% from two or more races. Hispanic or Latino of any race were 1.39% of the population.

There were 561 households, out of which 34.8% had children under the age of 18 living with them, 58.8% were married couples living together, 7.3% had a female householder with no husband present, and 28.7% were non-families. 20.3% of all households were made up of individuals, and 5.7% had someone living alone who was 65 years of age or older. The average household size was 2.57 and the average family size was 2.97.

In the CDP, the population was spread out, with 26.8% under the age of 18, 5.5% from 18 to 24, 34.1% from 25 to 44, 24.3% from 45 to 64, and 9.3% who were 65 years of age or older. The median age was 37 years. For every 100 females, there were 103.7 males. For every 100 females age 18 and over, there were 105.2 males.

The median income for a household in the CDP was $50,163, and the median income for a family was $54,318. Males had a median income of $39,509 versus $28,125 for females. The per capita income for the CDP was $21,732. About 6.3% of families and 7.4% of the population were below the poverty line, including 10.2% of those under age 18 and 7.9% of those age 65 or over.
