= Tantiusques =

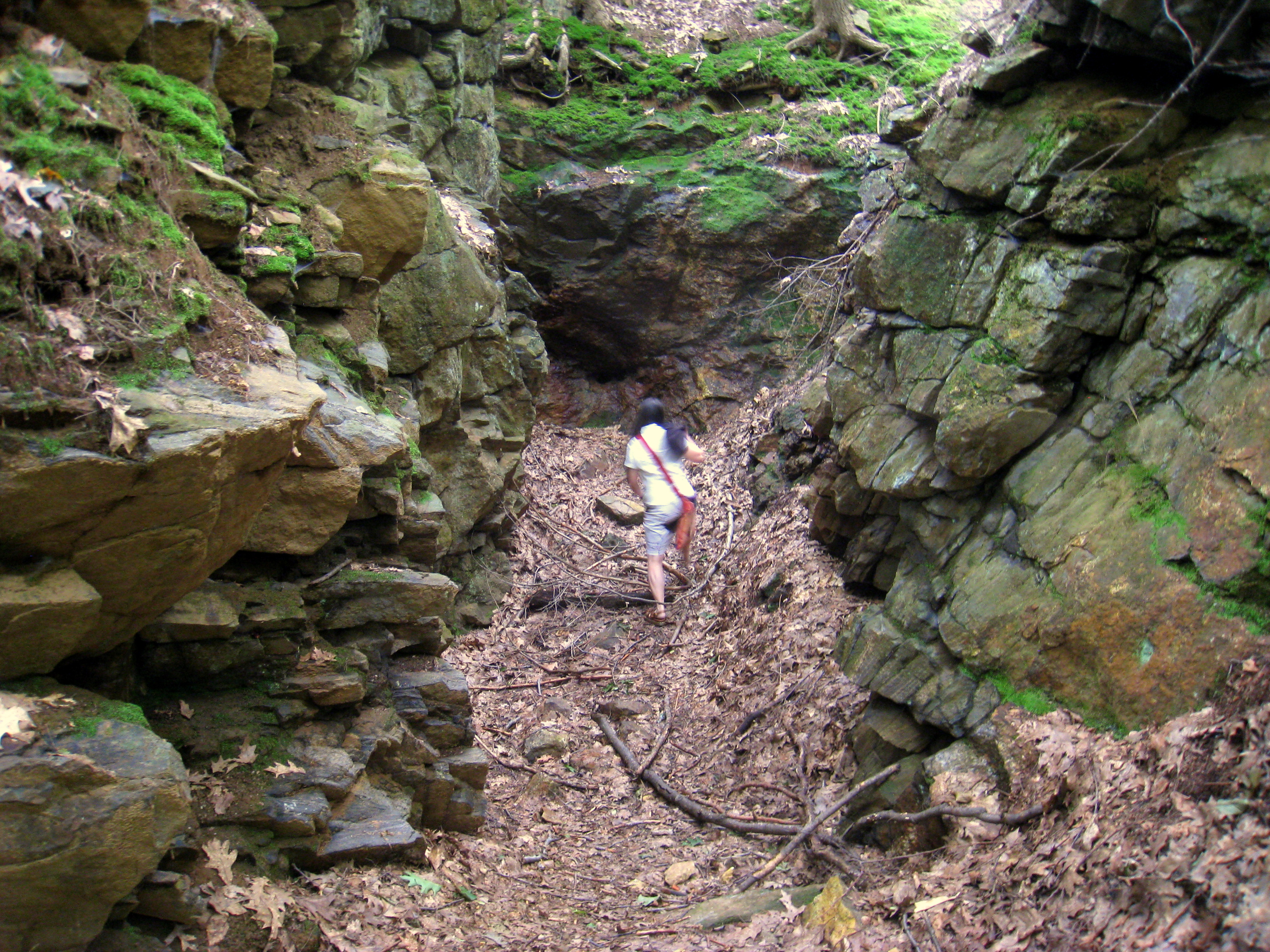
- Tantiusques
- Interactive map of Tantiusques
- Location: Massachusetts, United States
- Coordinates: 42°3′26″N 72°7′52″W
- Established: 1962
- Operator: The Trustees of Reservations
- Website: Tantiusques

- Tantiusques Reservation
- U.S. National Register of Historic Places
- Location within Massachusetts Location within the United States
- Location: Leadmine Rd., Sturbridge, Massachusetts
- Area: 15 acres (6.1 ha)
- Built: 1643
- NRHP reference No.: 83004141
- Added to NRHP: October 6, 1983

Tantiusques ("Tant-E-oos-kwiss") is a 57-acre (230,000 m^{2}) open space reservation and historic site registered with the National Register of Historic Places. The reservation is located in Sturbridge, Massachusetts, and is owned and managed by The Trustees of Reservations; it is notable for its historic, defunct graphite mines. This is a rural area with much of the adjacent and surrounding area undeveloped and forested. The reservation is entirely forested with oak-hickory forest and red maple in the wet areas and mountain laurel abundant throughout the understory. The name Tantiusques comes from a Nipmuc word meaning “the place between two low hills." The Nipmuc used the graphite to make ceremonial paints. The property also contains the ruins of a 19th-century period house that belonged to a mine worker of mixed African American and Native American ancestry.

== History ==
In 1644, John Winthrop the Younger, son of the first leader of the Massachusetts Bay Colony, purchased the area now occupied by the reservation from the Nipmuc and began a commercial mining operation. Besides graphite, the mine yielded modest amounts of lead and iron. The mine stayed in the hands of the Winthrop family until 1784 despite difficulties extracting minerals and its poor financial return.

In 1828, Frederic Tudor, a Boston merchant, purchased the property. He successfully mined the graphite for over a quarter of a century until his death in 1864 when the mining operation ceased with his death. He had employed Captain Joseph Dixon and his son, who would later found the J.D. Crucible Company of New Jersey. This company eventually evolved into Dixon Ticonderoga, the famous manufacturer of pencils.

By 1910 all mining operations at Tantiusques had ceased. Although forest has since reclaimed the area, mine cuts, ditches, tailings piles and several shafts are still visible. The mineshaft that tunnels into the face of the low ridge is the most recent of the excavations, dating to 1902. Most of the mining at Tantiusques was of the open trench variety. A cut along a ridge top on the property is the partially filled-in remainder of what was once a trench 1,000 feet (300 m) long, 20 to 50 feet (6.1 to 15.2 m) deep, and roughly 6 feet (1.8 m) wide.

Tantiusques was acquired by The Trustees of Reservations in 1962 through land donated by Roger Chaffee, given in memory of his professor, George H. Haynes, of Worcester Polytechnic Institute. Professor Haynes, a Sturbridge native, published The Tale of Tantiusques - An Early Mining Venture in Massachusetts in 1902. In 1983, through the efforts of the Sturbridge Historical Commission, the mine was placed on the National Register of Historic Places.

== The Crowd Site ==
The Crowd Site, a satellite parcel belonging to the Tantiusques reservation and purchased in 2002, contains the foundations of a house and barn belonging to Robert Crowd, of mixed African American and Native American ancestry, who worked in the mine in the 1850s. Among the customers of the mine during the time it was operated by Crowd was the pencil factory of Henry David Thoreau better known as author of Walden; or, Life in the Woods.

Crowd's house measured 20 by 25 feet (6.1 by 7.6 m) and was constructed circa 1815 by a newlywed couple, John Davis and Rhoda Vinton. They built their home on land owned by Rhoda's father, Jabez Vinton. With the death of John Davis in 1820, Rhoda moved back into her father's home and the house she and her husband built became a rental property. For the next 22 years it remained so and in 1830 its occupants included men who worked in the nearby graphite mine. In 1842 the house and property were purchased by Robert Crowd and his wife Diantha Scott.

Town records show that the Crowds continued to increase the size of their land holdings, but seem to have made few improvements to the house itself. Illness and changing fortunes eventually led the family to move away around 1860. After that, others lived in the house until it burned down circa 1924

In 1994 and 1995, staff of Old Sturbridge Village (an 1830s-themed village) conducted archaeological excavations at the site, which along with documentary research indicated that the Davis/Crowd house was very similar to other period small houses, of a housing form that is now almost completely vanished from the New England landscape. These houses had chimneys located in their northwest corners or along the north wall and unfinished attics. Most of the downstairs space was taken up by one single room.

== Current conditions ==
Currently, the remains of the graphite mine consist of several trenches, debris piles, mine cuts, and remnants of cart paths made from various mining operations. The main rock-cut is a trench about 400 feet long along the side of a ledge. The mine shaft that tunnels into the face of the low ridge is the most recent of all the excavations, dating to 1902. Most of the mining at Tantiusques was of the open trench variety. The cut along the top of the ridge is the partially filled-in remainder of what was once a several thousand foot-long trench, 20 to 50 feet in depth and roughly 6 feet in width, which followed the vein of graphite. Today this trench is separated from the main rock-cut by Lead Mine Road. At one time these two trenches connected, forming most of the mine. Over the years many sections of the mine have collapsed and filled in with material.

The best preserved feature on the property is a mine shaft entrance about 150 feet south of the parking area. This shaft runs about 50 yards into the side of the ledge. The shaft entrance suffers from bad drainage, filling with ankle-deep water during wet periods.

The Crowd Site consists of the remains of two foundations, a deep cellar hole where the house was, and shallower one for the barn. There is also an old well which has been capped. These features are on an otherwise wooded 2 acre lot on the corner of Leadmine and Goodrich Roads.

== Archeological artifacts ==
Archaeological evidence on the layout of the Davis/Crowd farm, and from the artifacts found at the site, is scheduled to be used in Old Sturbridge Village's Small House Exhibit, a departure from the larger houses typical of the period village museum. The interpretation of the superstructure of the Crowd house is based in part on the examination of a couple of comparable sized and organized houses in Sturbridge and Brookfield, Massachusetts, and on the probate inventories of two occupants of the house prior to the Crowds.

In a multi-occupant site it is almost impossible to differentiate the artifacts of one family from another except. There is one deposit of artifacts that has been attributed to the Crowd family occupation and dates to the period from 1842 to 1860. This is the lower portion of a post hole located between the house and the well, part of whose contents seem to be sandwiched into the occupation years of the Crowd family.

Most artifacts from the Crowd family associated feature include a piece of raw graphite, a couple of black glass buttons, a fragment of brass jewelry, a sawn beef bone, a pigs tooth, fragments of tinware and a glass inkwell. The ceramics include a shard of yellow-ware with blue dendritic decoration, three shards from a blue transfer printed teacup bearing an oriental landscape motif, two shards of polychrome handpainted ware with slightly different design styles and probably from two different teacups, and a couple of shards of redware.

== Natural resources ==
The entire reservation is designated by Massachusetts BioMap as Supporting Natural Landscape for Core Habitat. The Tantiusques is a densely forested landscape mostly dominated by oak and hickory trees with the occasional hemlock. Mountain laurel is patchy but forms a dense understory throughout the site. This forest serves as an interior habitat for wildlife, including more than 25 species of birds.

A total of 25 species of birds were observed at the Tantiusques during the a breeding bird survey which was conducted in 2008. Of the species observed, six are listed as priority species. The most common species reflect the common habitat at the reservation which is forest, including areas of dense understory. No state-listed rare species were observed on the property. Few wide-ranging, or area-sensitive species were observed. These include raptors and larger birds such as turkeys and pileated woodpecker which roam over hundreds of acres as well as smaller species, which only nest in large blocks of habitat.

The size of the reservation may have affected the survey since many of these species are not well detected using the point count method. Neotropical migrant species that typically require large patches of forest to support viable populations are well represented and include ovenbird, black-throated blue warbler, eastern wood pewee, red-eyed vireo, scarlet tanager, eastern wood pewee and veery. Neotropical migrants represent more than half of the species observed and four out of the five most abundant species recorded.

== Threats to natural resources ==
Invasive plants currently occur at very low densities within this site. The non-native insect hemlock woolly adelgid (HWA) has the potential to severely alter forest species competition and structure. Although hemlock is not common the Tantiusques, nearly half of the trees samples were infested with HWA in 2008.

== Recreation ==
The property is open year-round, sunrise to sunset, for hiking, mountain biking, horseback riding, cross country skiing, and hunting (in season). A 1.5-mile (2 km) loop trail leads through forests filled with mountain laurel to the former mine. This trail connects to a spur trail that passes through the adjacent Leadmine Wildlife Management Area and ends at the ruins of the Robert Crowd Site. Visitors can view the foundations of the house and barn of the African-American and Native American man who worked at the mine in the 1850s

A trailhead is located on Leadmine Road in Sturbridge.

== See also ==
- National Register of Historic Places listings in Worcester County, Massachusetts
