= Fiskdale, Massachusetts =

CDP in Sturbridge, Massachusetts, United States

- Census-designated place
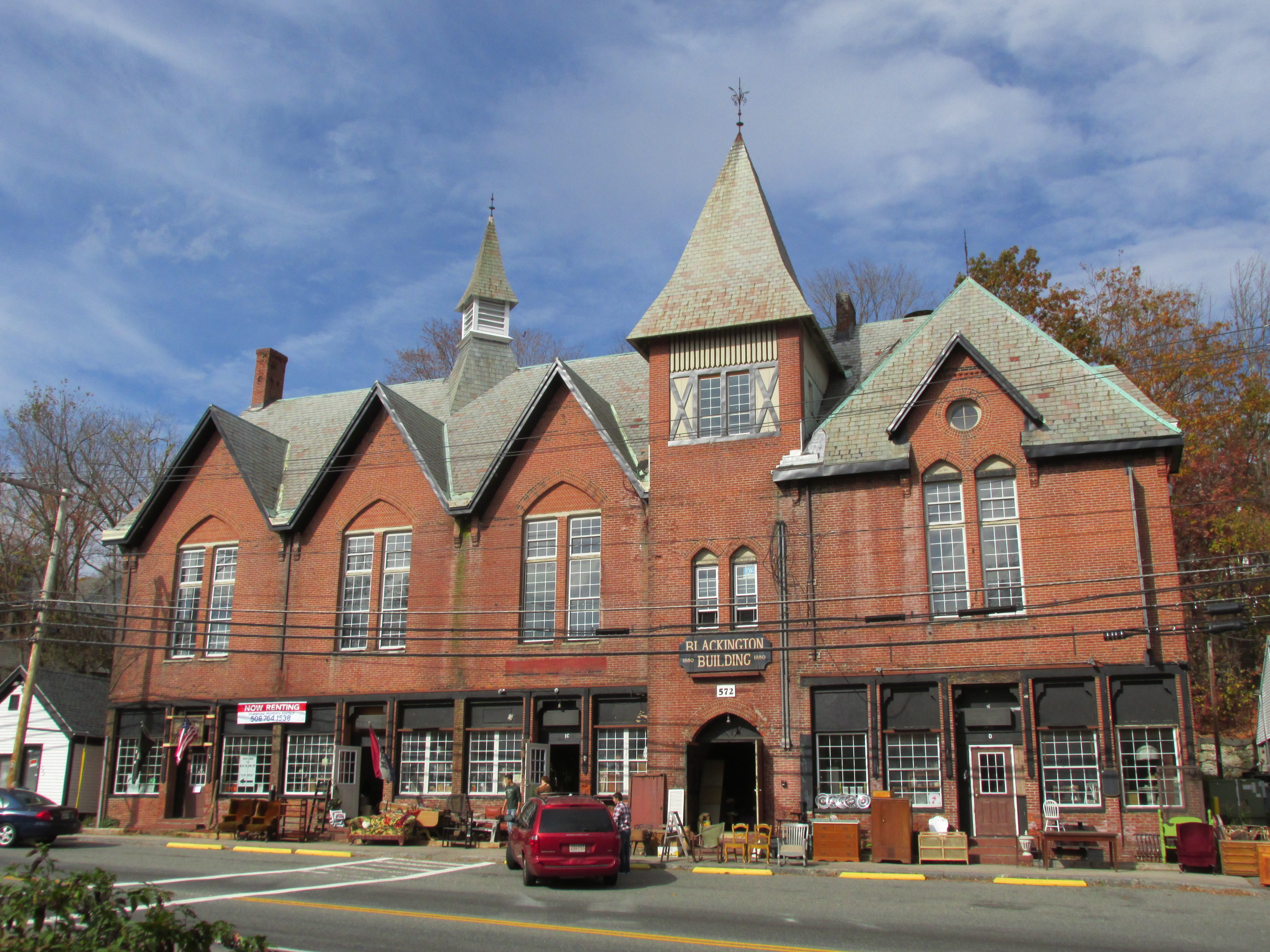
- Blackington Building

- Location in Worcester County and the state of Massachusetts.
- Coordinates: 42°6′54″N 72°6′42″W
- Country: United States
- State: Massachusetts
- County: Worcester

Area
  - Total: 3.31 sq mi (8.58 km^{2})
  - Land: 3.17 sq mi (8.21 km^{2})
  - Water: 0.14 sq mi (0.37 km^{2})
- Elevation: 627 ft (191 m)

Population (2020)
  - Total: 2,797
  - Density: 882.8/sq mi (340.87/km^{2})
- Time zone: UTC−5 (Eastern (EST))
  - Summer (DST): UTC−4 (EDT)
- ZIP Codes: 01518 (Fiskdale); 01566 (Sturbridge)
- Area code: 508
- FIPS code: 25-23840
- GNIS feature ID: 0610057

Fiskdale (or Fiskedale) is a census-designated place (CDP) in the town of Sturbridge in Worcester County, Massachusetts, United States. As of the 2020 census, Fiskdale had a population of 2,797.

== Geography ==
Fiskdale is located at 42°6′54″N 72°6′42″W (42.114994, -72.111547).

According to the United States Census Bureau, the CDP has a total area of 8.5 km^{2} (3.3 sq mi), of which 8.3 km^{2} (3.2 sq mi) is land and 0.3 km^{2} (0.12 sq mi) (3.04%) is water.

Fiskdale is generally regarded by residents of Sturbridge to include the northwestern corner of the town, containing Tantasqua Regional High School, the densely populated areas around Route 148 (Brookfield Road), Holland Road area, as well as much of Route 20 to the west of Interstate 84. Big Alum Pond, Long Pond, and part of East Brimfield Lake are located in Fiskdale.

== Demographics ==
Historical population
Census	Pop.	Note	%±
2020	2,797		—
U.S. Decennial Census

=== 2020 census ===
As of the 2020 census, Fiskdale had a population of 2,797. The median age was 40.7 years. 25.1% of residents were under the age of 18 and 17.1% of residents were 65 years of age or older. For every 100 females there were 92.8 males, and for every 100 females age 18 and over there were 87.2 males age 18 and over.

96.8% of residents lived in urban areas, while 3.2% lived in rural areas.

There were 1,116 households in Fiskdale, of which 32.3% had children under the age of 18 living in them. Of all households, 51.5% were married-couple households, 15.9% were households with a male householder and no spouse or partner present, and 27.8% were households with a female householder and no spouse or partner present. About 26.9% of all households were made up of individuals and 15.6% had someone living alone who was 65 years of age or older.

There were 1,206 housing units, of which 7.5% were vacant. The homeowner vacancy rate was 1.3% and the rental vacancy rate was 4.0%.

Racial composition as of the 2020 census
Race	Number	Percent
White	2,453	87.7%
Black or African American	47	1.7%
American Indian and Alaska Native	9	0.3%
Asian	71	2.5%
Native Hawaiian and Other Pacific Islander	1	0.0%
Some other race	42	1.5%
Two or more races	174	6.2%
Hispanic or Latino (of any race)	135	4.8%

=== 2000 census ===
As of the census of 2000, there were 2,156 people, 873 households, and 568 families residing in the CDP. The population density was 261.0 people /km^{2} (676 people/mi^{2}). There were 914 housing units at an average density of 110.6 units /km^{2} (286 units/mi^{2}). The racial makeup of the CDP was 95.87% White, 0.60% African American, 0.60% Native American, 0.42% Asian, 0.09% Pacific Islander, 0.93% from other races, and 1.48% from two or more races. Hispanic or Latino of any race were 2.23% of the population.

There were 873 households, out of which 34.8% had children under the age of 18 living with them, 50.7% were married couples living together, 11.7% had a female householder with no husband present, and 34.9% were non-families. Of all households, 30.2% were made up of individuals, and 14.7% had someone living alone who was 65 years of age or older. The average household size was 2.46 and the average family size was 3.09.

In the CDP, the population was spread out, with 27.2% under the age of 18, 5.7% from 18 to 24, 29.3% from 25 to 44, 23.9% from 45 to 64, and 13.9% who were 65 years of age or older. The median age was 37 years. For every 100 females, there were 90.3 males. For every 100 females age 18 and over, there were 88.0 males.

The median income for a household in the CDP was $48,924, and the median income for a family was $60,032. Males had a median income of $47,609 versus $26,496 for females. The per capita income for the CDP was $24,118. About 8.6% of families and 11.4% of the population were below the poverty line, including 16.5% of those under age 18 and 20.3% of those age 65 or over.
