= Brimfield Antique Show =

American antique show

The Brimfield Antique Show is an antique show held in Brimfield, Massachusetts. It is the largest outdoor antiques show in New England. It takes place three times each year, for six days in May, July, and September.

All 2020 shows were cancelled due to the COVID-19 pandemic. Events were held online.

The May 2021 show occurred, but with just Brimfield Auction Acres open.
