= Tantasqua Regional High School =

Coordinates: 42.160°N 72.131°W

- School seal

Location
- 319 Brookfield Rd; Fiskdale, Massachusetts 01518; United States

Information
- Type: Public; Open enrollment
- Established: 1953
- Principal: Peter Dufresne
- Teaching staff: 82.50 (FTE)
- Grades: 9–12
- Enrollment: 632 (2024-2025)
- Student to teacher ratio: 7.66
- Colors: Green and gold
- Song: Men Of Harlech
- Athletics conference: Central Massachusetts Athletic Conference
- Mascot: Warrior
- Publication: Passages
- Newspaper: The Tomahawk
- Yearbook: Tantasquan
- Budget: $24,578,121 total $13,480 per pupil (2016)
- Communities served: Brimfield, Brookfield, Holland, Sturbridge, Wales
- Website: ths.tantasqua.org
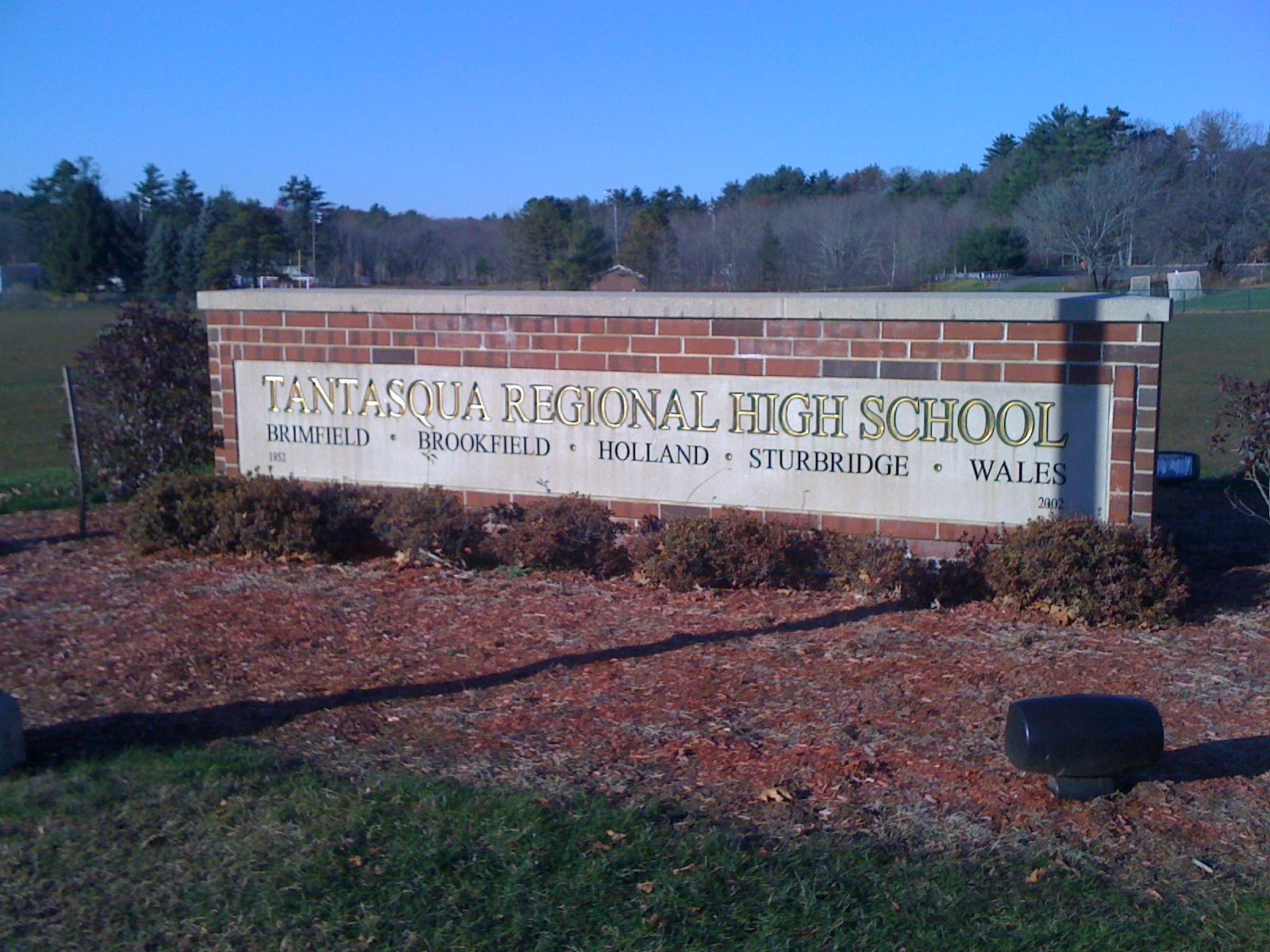
- Route-148 entrance to Tantasqua Regional High School, listing the five towns in the region

Tantasqua Regional High School is located in Fiskdale, Massachusetts. It serves the towns of Brimfield, Brookfield, Holland, Sturbridge, and Wales. The school colors are green and gold and the school song is "Hail, Tantasqua", set to the music of "Men of Harlech."

== History ==
Tantasqua Regional High School was founded in 1953, and an initial addition to the building was approved in 1962. A 1995 plan for renovation was rejected, but a new building was completed in 2002.

== Format ==
Tantasqua is divided into an academic division and a technical division.

== Athletics ==
TRHS athletic teams are nicknamed the Warriors. The baseball team won the 1977 Massachusetts Division 2 state championship, and the boys basketball team won the 2007 Division 2 state championship.

== Performing arts ==
Tantasqua has two competitive show choirs, the mixed-gender "ENCORE!" and the all-female "Applause" (formerly Radiance). The program also hosts an annual competition.

== Notable alumni ==
- Joel Crouse, singer
- Tim Hagen, artist
