= Brookfield, Massachusetts =

Town in Massachusetts

- Town
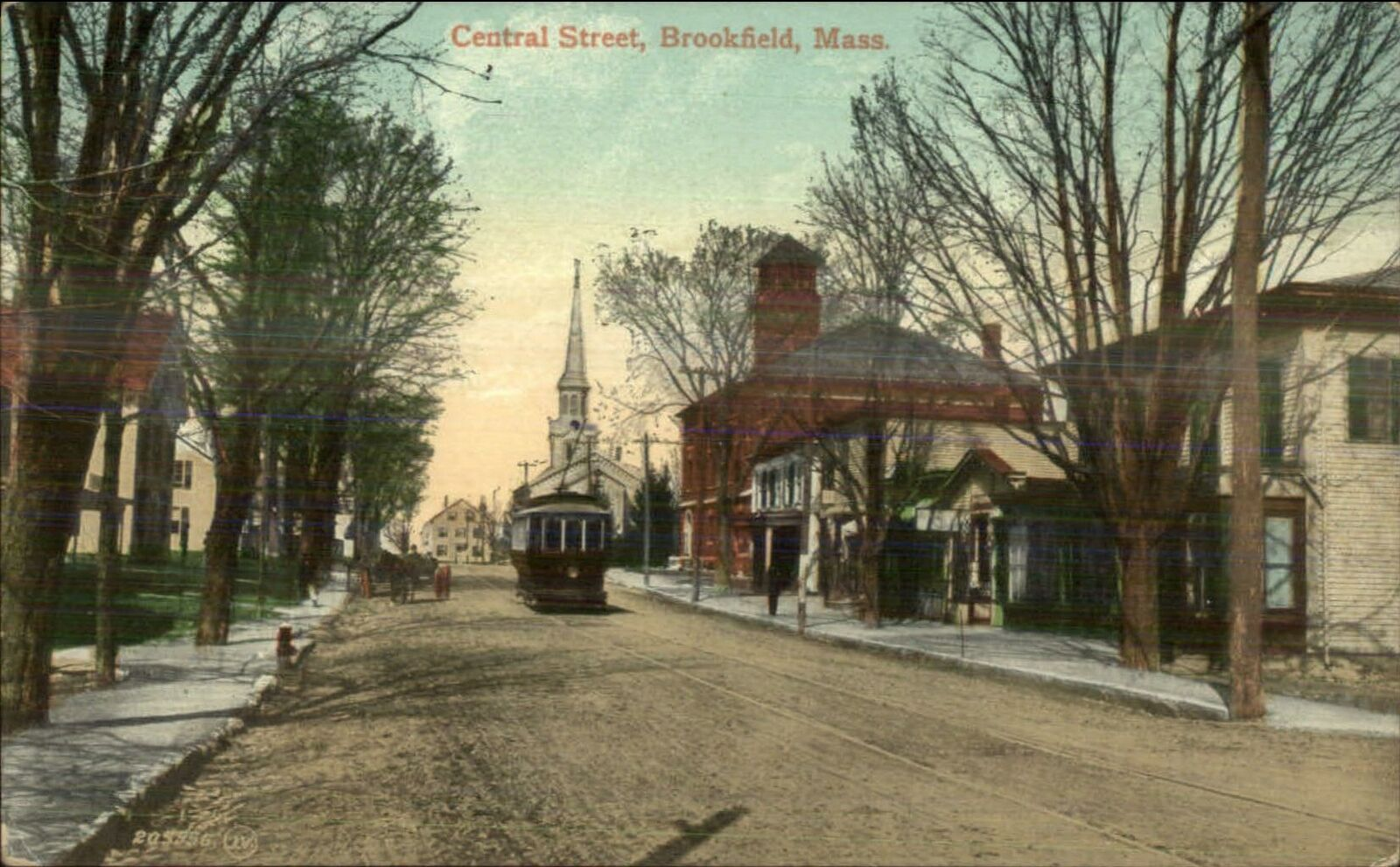
- Central Street in 1908

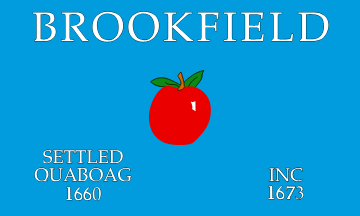
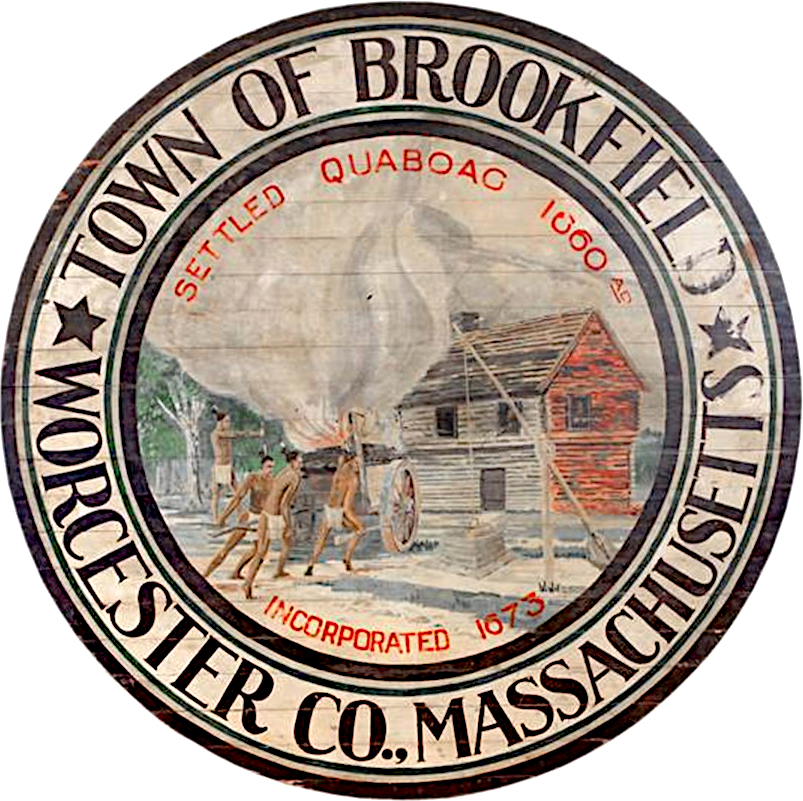
- Flag Seal

- Location in Worcester County and the state of Massachusetts.
- Coordinates: 42°12′50″N 72°06′10″W
- Country: United States
- State: Massachusetts
- County: Worcester
- Settled: 1660
- Incorporated: 1718

Government
  - Type: Open town meeting
  - Board of Selectmen: Richard A. Chaffee; Beth L. Coughlin; Sarah E. Campbell
  - Town Administrator: Ronald Aponte
  - Administrative Assistant: Karen Trainor Resseguie

Area
  - Total: 16.6 sq mi (42.9 km^{2})
  - Land: 15.5 sq mi (40.2 km^{2})
  - Water: 1.0 sq mi (2.7 km^{2})
- Elevation: 715 ft (218 m)

Population (2020)
  - Total: 3,439
  - Density: 222/sq mi (85.5/km^{2})
- Time zone: UTC−5 (Eastern)
  - Summer (DST): UTC−4 (Eastern)
- ZIP Code: 01506
- Area code: 508/774
- FIPS code: 25-09105
- GNIS feature ID: 0618358
- Website: brookfieldma.us

Brookfield is a town in Worcester County, Massachusetts, United States. Brookfield was first settled by Europeans in 1660. The population was 3,439 at the 2020 census.

== History ==
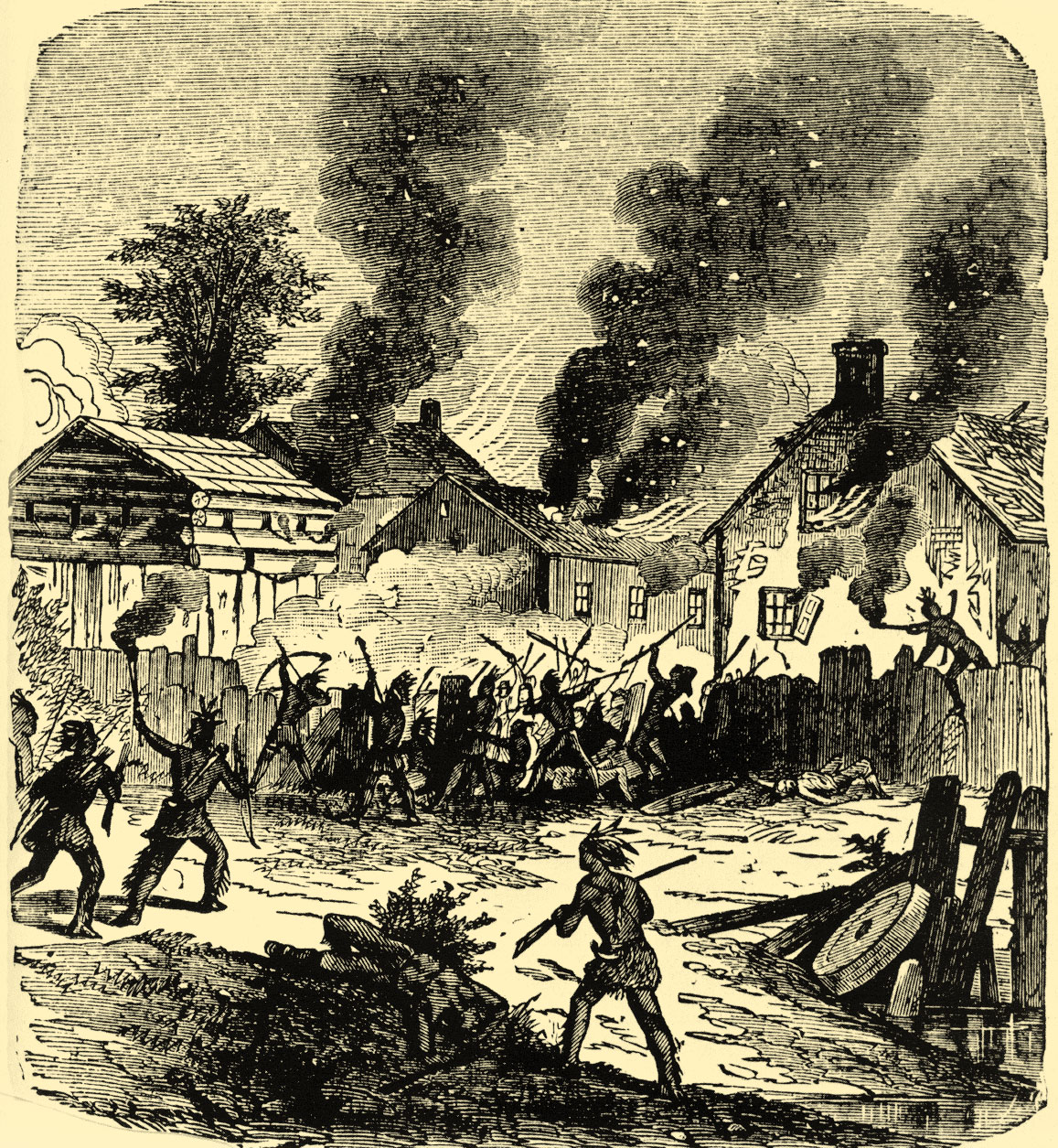
Capture of Brookfield by Nipmucks in 1675

Brookfield was first settled by Europeans in 1660 and was officially incorporated in 1718. The town was settled by men from Ipswich as part of the Quaboag Plantation lands.

In August 1675, King Philip's War reached central Massachusetts. Brookfield, one of the most isolated settlements in the colony, was attacked by Nipmuck forces. After an ambush, the town was besieged. For two days the townsfolk, consisting of 80 people, sought shelter in the garrison house while the rest of the town was completely destroyed. The settlement lay abandoned for twelve years.

During the winter of 1776, General Henry Knox passed through the town with cannon from Fort Ticonderoga to end the Siege of Boston. A marker along Route 9 commemorates his route.

=== Bathsheba Spooner ===
In March 1778, Joshua Spooner, a wealthy farmer in Brookfield, was beaten to death and his body stuffed down a well. Four people were hanged for the crime: two British soldiers, a young Continental soldier, and Spooner's wife, Bathsheba, who was charged with instigating the murder. She was 32 years old and five months pregnant when executed. Newspapers described the case as "the most extraordinary crime ever perpetrated in New England."

Bathsheba was the mother of three young children, and in her own words felt "an utter aversion" for her husband, who was known to be an abusive drunk.

A year before the murder, she took in and nursed a sixteen-year-old Continental soldier who was returning from a year's enlistment under George Washington. The two became lovers and conceived a child.

Divorces were all but impossible for women at that time, and adulteresses were stripped to the waist and publicly whipped. Bathsheba's pregnancy occasioned a series of desperate plots to murder her husband, finally brought to fruition with the aid of two British deserters from General John Burgoyne's defeated army.

As the daughter of the state's most prominent and despised Loyalist, Bathsheba bore the brunt of the political, cultural, and gender prejudices of her day. When she sought a stay of execution to deliver her baby, the Massachusetts Council rejected her petition, and she was promptly hanged before a crowd of 5,000 spectators.

=== Washington's visit ===
Across from the former Brookfield Inn on West Main Street (Route 9) is a memorial that designates this part of the road as the George Washington Memorial Highway. In 1789, the first president of the United States traveled through five of the New England states. This tour has become the basis for all of the "George Washington slept here" claims—and although Washington watered his horses here, he never slept in Brookfield. It seems his party would have spent the night in Brookfield except that the innkeeper, Mrs. Bannister, was in bed with a terrible headache. When awakened, she mistook him for a college president and sent him on to the neighboring town of Spencer. On learning of her mistake, she supposedly said: "Bless me! One look at that good man would have cured my aching head."

=== Other Brookfields ===
Lands of the town have given rise to three others—North Brookfield in 1812, West Brookfield in 1848, and East Brookfield in 1920.

== Geography ==
According to the United States Census Bureau, the town has a total area of 16.6 square miles (43 km^{2}), of which 15.5 square miles (40 km^{2}) is land and 1.0 square mile (2.6 km^{2}), or 6.34%, is water. Brookfield is bounded on the northwest, north and east by towns that were formerly part of it: West Brookfield, North Brookfield, and East Brookfield, respectively; on the south by Sturbridge and a short, 0.33-mile (0.5 km) stretch of Brimfield; and on the southwest by Warren. Brookfield is 18 miles (29 km) west of Worcester, 30 miles (48 km) east-northeast of Springfield, and 57 miles (92 km) west of Boston.

The town is located in the southwestern part of Worcester County, along the Quaboag River. The river is bordered by swampy lands, and several areas around it are protected as wildlife management areas. Along the East Brookfield border lie two large ponds which are part of the river, Quaboag Pond to the north and Quacumquasit Pond to the south, extending into Sturbridge. There are also several small brooks running into these waterways, and the land around the town is mostly flat, with some small hills in the southern half of town.

The town center lies at the intersection of Route 9 and Route 148. The town also lies along the former Boston and Albany Railroad (now owned/operated by CSX). This line is also the Lake Shore Limited route of Amtrak's rail service between Worcester and Springfield, though there is no stop between the two cities. The town lies just north of Interstate 90 (the Massachusetts Turnpike) near its junction with Interstate 84 at Exit 9. This intersection is the closest exit along the Pike to town, 10 miles (16 km) away to the south, with Palmer's exit being 15 miles (24 km) to the west, and Auburn's exit (at Interstate 395) being 22 miles (35 km) to the east. The nearest municipal airport is located in Southbridge, and the nearest national air service via Jet Blue can be reached at Worcester Regional Airport (ORH), located in Worcester.

== Demographics ==
Historical population
Year	Pop.	±%
1790	3,100	—
1850	1,674	−46.0%
1860	2,276	+36.0%
1870	2,527	+11.0%
1880	2,823	+11.7%
1890	3,352	+18.7%
1900	3,062	−8.7%
1910	2,204	−28.0%
1920	2,216	+0.5%
1930	1,352	−39.0%
1940	1,393	+3.0%
1950	1,567	+12.5%
1960	1,751	+11.7%
1970	2,063	+17.8%
1980	2,397	+16.2%
1990	2,968	+23.8%
2000	3,051	+2.8%
2010	3,390	+11.1%
2020	3,439	+1.4%
2022	3,450	+0.3%
Source: United States census records and Population Estimates Program data.

State government
State Representative(s):	Donnie Berthiaume (R)
State Senator(s):	Anne M. Gobi (D)
Governor's Councilor(s):	Jen Caissie (R)
Federal government
U.S. Representative(s):	1st District
U.S. Senators:	Elizabeth Warren (D), Ed Markey (D)

By the 2010 census, the population had reached 3,390.

As of the census of 2000, there were 3,051 people, 1,204 households, and 857 families residing in the town. The population density was 196.5 inhabitants per square mile (75.9/km^{2}). There were 1,302 housing units at an average density of 83.9 per square mile (32.4/km^{2}). The racial makeup of the town was 98.10% White, 0.20% African American, 0.52% Native American, 0.29% Asian, 0.03% from other races, and 0.85% from two or more races. Hispanic or Latino of any race were 0.59% of the population.

There were 1,204 households, out of which 32.4% had children under the age of 18 living with them, 57.6% were married couples living together, 9.1% had a female householder with no husband present, and 28.8% were non-families. Of all households 23.8% were made up of individuals, and 8.8% had someone living alone who was 65 years of age or older. The average household size was 2.53 and the average family size was 2.98.

In the town, the population was spread out, with 25.9% under the age of 18, 5.8% from 18 to 24, 29.2% from 25 to 44, 25.6% from 45 to 64, and 13.5% who were 65 years of age or older. The median age was 39 years. For every 100 females, there were 96.6 males. For every 100 females age 18 and over, there were 93.8 males.

The median income for a household in the town was $45,655, and the median income for a family was $54,519. Males had a median income of $38,806 versus $29,155 for females. The per capita income for the town was $20,144. About 3.8% of families and 6.1% of the population were below the poverty line, including 4.9% of those under age 18 and 13.7% of those age 65 or over.

== Library ==
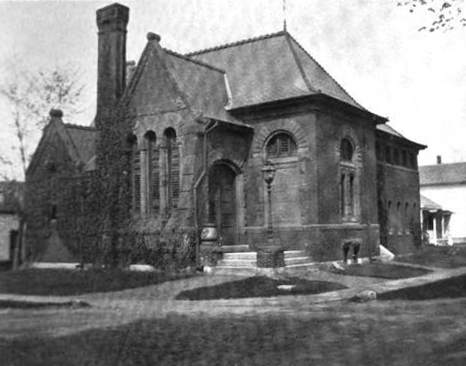
Brookfield public library, 1899

The public library in Brookfield began in the 1860s. In fiscal year 2008, the town of Brookfield spent 1.49% ($106,066) of its budget on its public library—approximately $35 per person.

== Education ==
Brookfield Elementary School, serving grades K–6, has its own school committee, part of School Union 61. Brookfield students attend Tantasqua Regional Junior High School (grades 7–8) and Tantasqua Regional High School in Sturbridge. Union 61 and the Tantasqua district share administrators, including the superintendent, and both include Brimfield, Brookfield, Holland, Sturbridge and Wales.

== Notable people ==
Tip Top Country Store in Brookfield Center

- William Appleton, congressman
- John Brooks, Jr., military officer during the War of 1812
- Asa Danforth, highway engineer
- Arthur Louis Day, geological physicist
- William B. Draper, importer and bank president
- Theodore Foster, politician
- Mary Jane Hawes, author
- Albert R. Howe, congressman
- Harrison Hunter, actor
- Jennifer Lafleur, actor
- Pliny T. Merrick, attorney and judge
- Joseph Read, soldier
- Bathsheba Spooner, criminal
- George B. Upham, congressman
- Jabez Upham, congressman
