= Wales, Massachusetts =

- Town
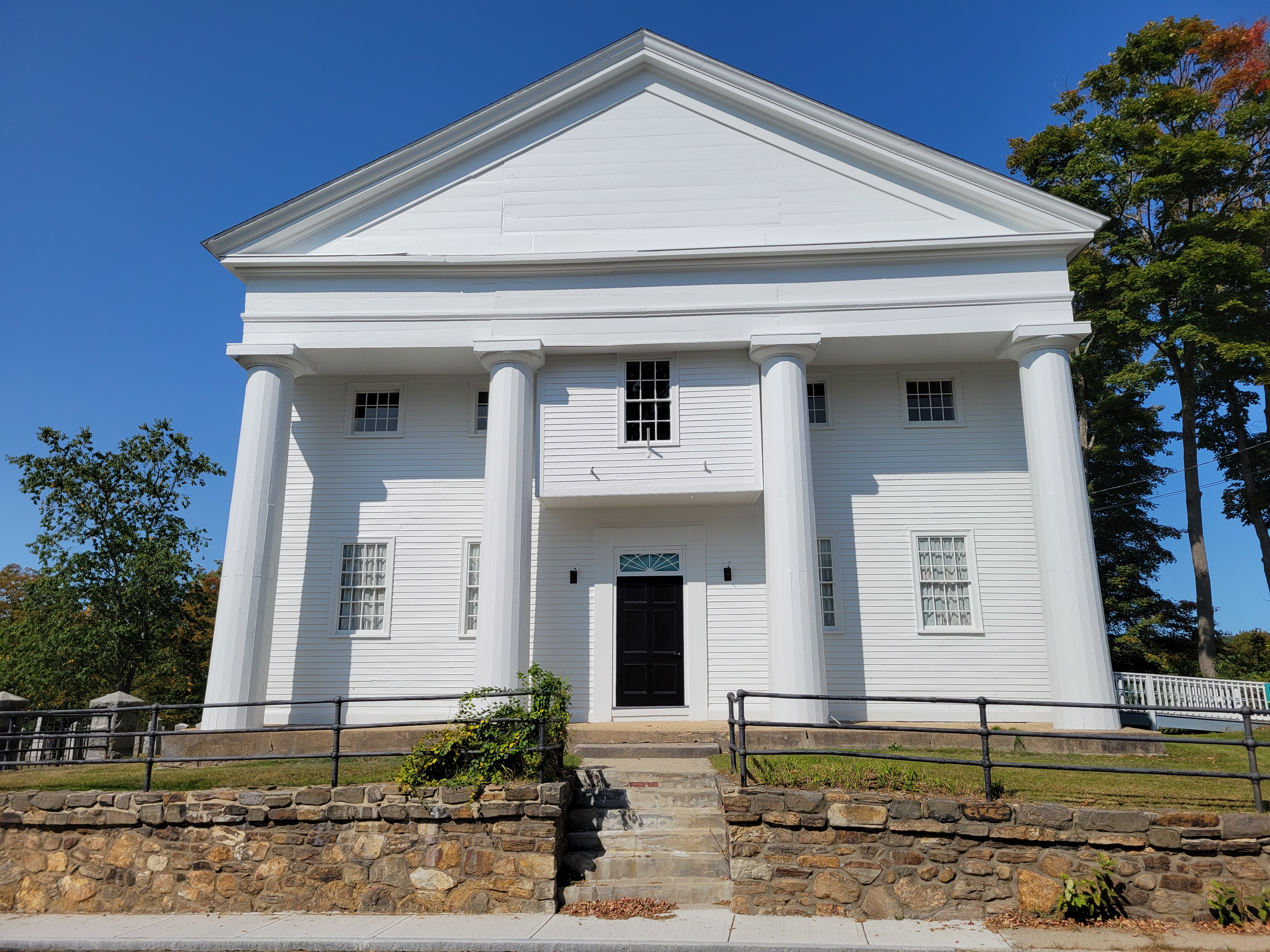
- The Old Town Hall

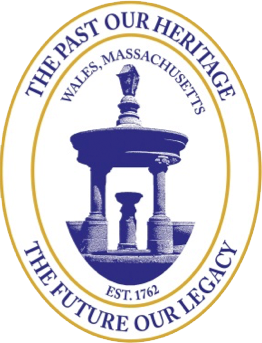
- Seal
- Motto: The Past Our Heritage, The Future Our Legacy
- Location in Hampden County in Massachusetts
- Coordinates: 42°04′10″N 72°13′22″W
- Country: United States
- State: Massachusetts
- County: Hampden
- Settled: 1726
- Incorporated: 1775

Government
  - Type: Open town meeting

Area
  - Total: 15.9 sq mi (41.3 km^{2})
  - Land: 15.7 sq mi (40.7 km^{2})
  - Water: 0.23 sq mi (0.6 km^{2})
- Elevation: 948 ft (289 m)

Population (2020)
  - Total: 1,832
  - Density: 117/sq mi (45.0/km^{2})
- Time zone: UTC−5 (Eastern)
  - Summer (DST): UTC−4 (Eastern)
- ZIP Codes: 01081 (Wales); 01057 (Monson)
- Area code: 413
- FIPS code: 25-72390
- GNIS feature ID: 0619389
- Website: www.townofwales.net

Wales is a town in Hampden County, Massachusetts, United States. The population was 1,838 at the 2020 census. It is part of the Springfield, Massachusetts Metropolitan Statistical Area.

== History ==
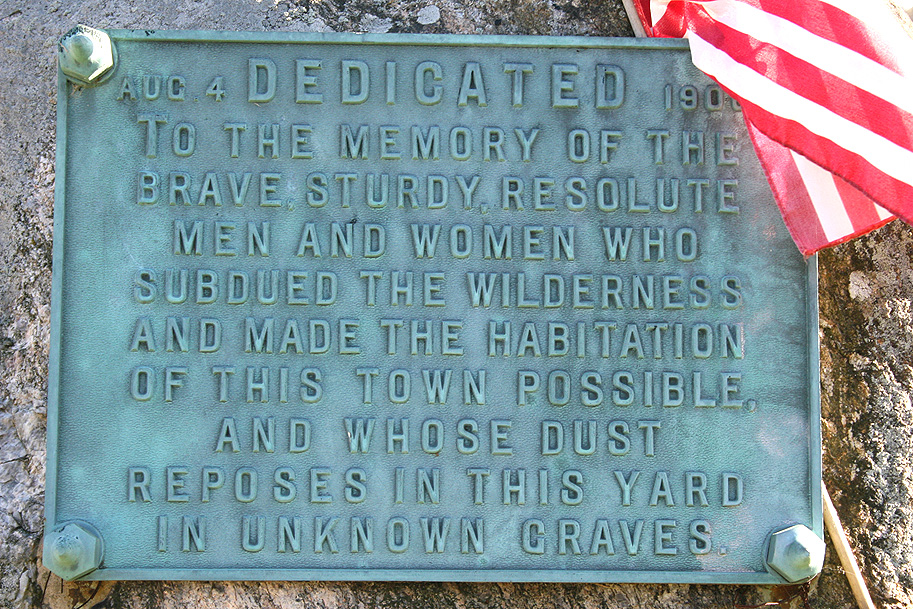
Stone marker at Wales historical cemetery commemorating the pioneers who founded the Town of Wales

Wales was first settled by Europeans in 1726 and was officially incorporated on August 23, 1775, as "South Brimfield," a name it kept until February 20, 1828. The town was renamed after James Lawrence Wales, a local benefactor. Initial settlers included Anthony Needham, John Bullen, and Samuel and Dorothy Munger. The next generation of Mungers became prominent in the town. Samuel (Jr.) served as a selectman and was deacon of the Baptist Church for many years. Nathaniel was one of 12 men of the district appointed as a "court of Justice and Honor to determine all controversies that may hereafter arise in said District," and was also a deacon of the Baptist Church. The "Meadow District" of Wales was originally known as "Munger's Meadow" and includes graves of early pioneers.

== Geography ==
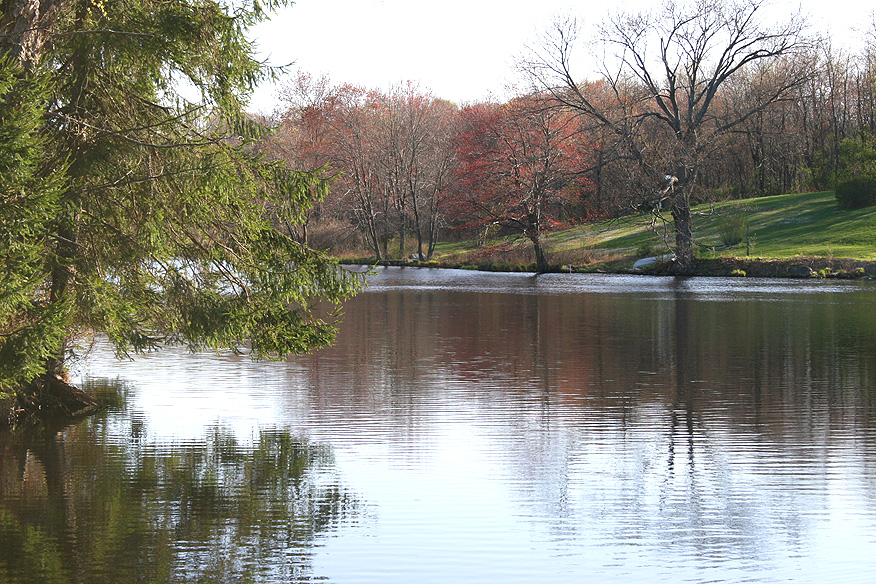
Pond at Wales, Massachusetts

By the 2010 census, the population had reached 1,838.

According to the United States Census Bureau, the town has a total area of 15.9 square miles (41.3 km^{2}), of which 15.7 square miles (40.7 km^{2}) are land and 0.2 square miles (0.6 km^{2}), or 1.46%, are water. Wales is in southeastern Hampden County and is bounded on the west by Monson; on the south by Stafford and Union, Connecticut; on the east by Holland; and on the north by Brimfield.

Massachusetts Route 19 crosses the town, leading north 4 miles (6 km) to the center of Brimfield and south 10 miles (16 km) (via Connecticut Route 19) to Stafford Springs, Connecticut.

== Education ==
Wales Elementary School, serving grades K–6, has its own school committee, part of School Union 61. Wales students attend Tantasqua Regional Junior High School (grades 7–8) and Tantasqua Regional High School in Sturbridge. Union 61 and the Tantasqua district share administrators, including the superintendent, and both include Brimfield, Brookfield, Holland, Sturbridge and Wales.

== Library ==
The Wales Public Library opened in 1897. In fiscal year 2008, the town of Wales spent 1.28% ($45,480) of its budget on its public library—approximately $24 per person, per year ($31.63 adjusted for inflation to 2022).

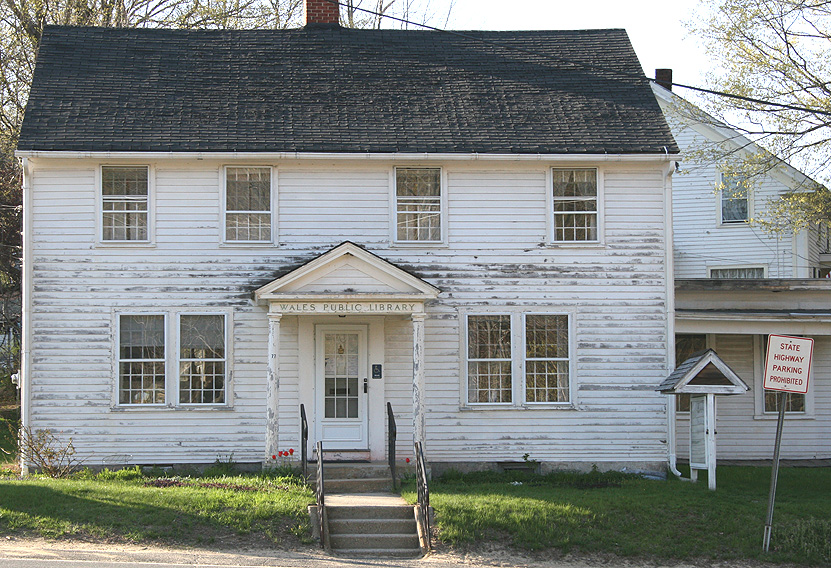
Wales Public Library

== Demographics ==
As of the census of 2000, there had been 1,737 people, 660 households, and 481 families residing in the town. The population density was 110.3 inhabitants per square mile (42.6/km^{2}). There were 796 housing units at an average density of 50.5 per square mile (19.5/km^{2}). The racial makeup of the town was 97.75% White, 0.52% African American, 0.29% Native American, 0.17% Asian, 0.35% from other races, and 0.92% from two or more races. Hispanic or Latino of any race were 0.63% of the population.

Historical population
Year	Pop.	±%
1790	606	—
1850	711	+17.3%
1860	677	−4.8%
1870	831	+22.7%
1880	1,030	+23.9%
1890	700	−32.0%
1900	773	+10.4%
1910	345	−55.4%
1920	419	+21.4%
1930	300	−28.4%
1940	367	+22.3%
1950	497	+35.4%
1960	659	+32.6%
1970	852	+29.3%
1980	1,177	+38.1%
1990	1,566	+33.1%
2000	1,737	+10.9%
2010	1,838	+5.8%
2020	1,832	−0.3%
2022	1,807	−1.4%
Source: United States census records and Population Estimates Program data.

There were 660 households, out of which 33.5% had children under the age of 18 living with them, 57.4% were married couples living together, and 11.1% had a female head of household with no husband present.

The median income for a household in the town was $48,906, and the median income for a family was $51,629. Males had a median income of $39,766 versus $27,557 for females. The per capita income for the town was $21,267. About 1.8% of families and 3.5% of the population were below the poverty line, including 3.2% of those under age 18 and 3.9% of those age 65 or over.
