= Brimfield, Massachusetts =

- Town
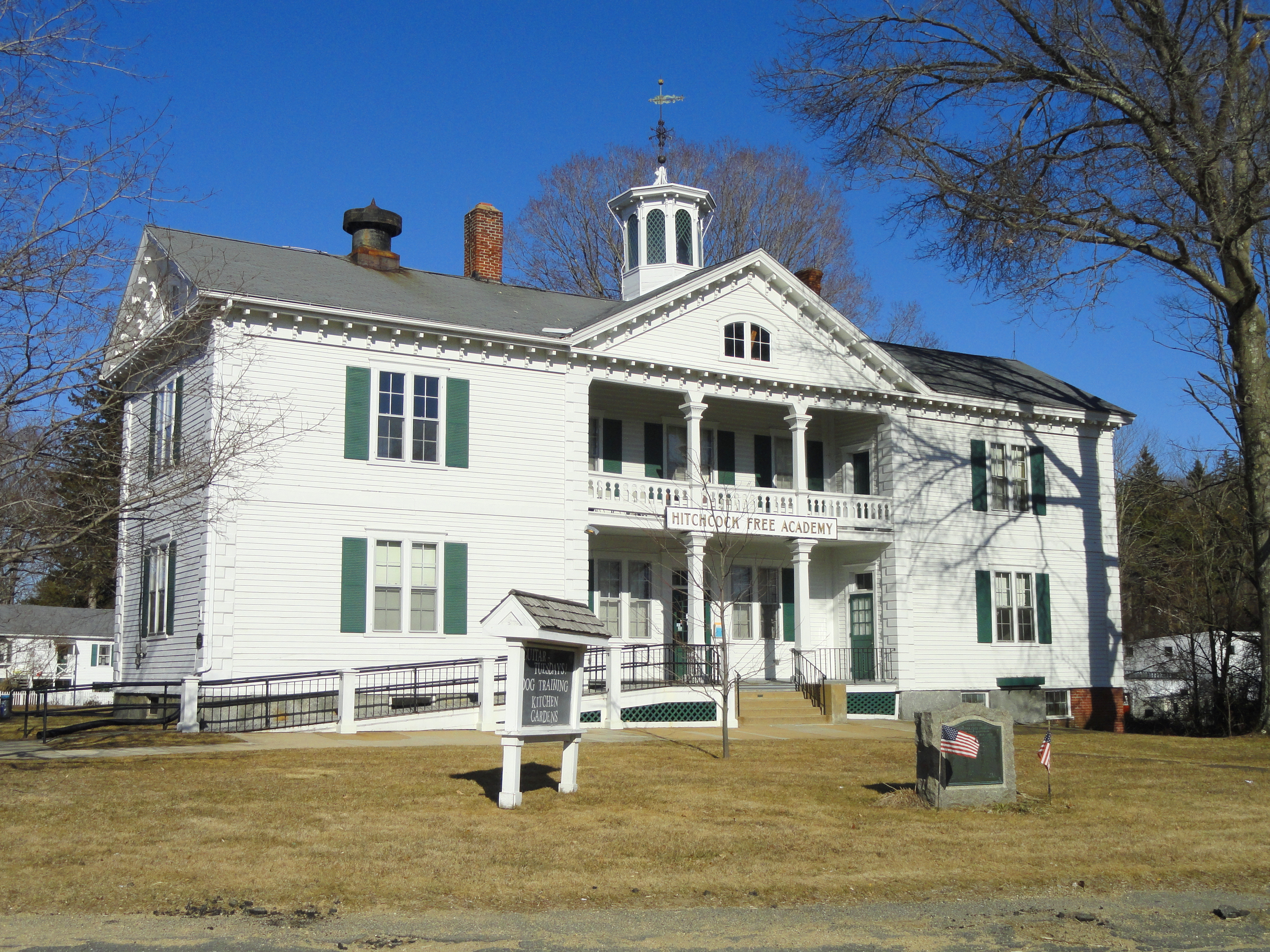
- Hitchcock Free Academy

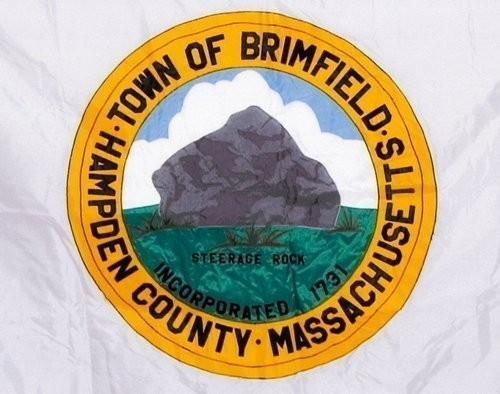
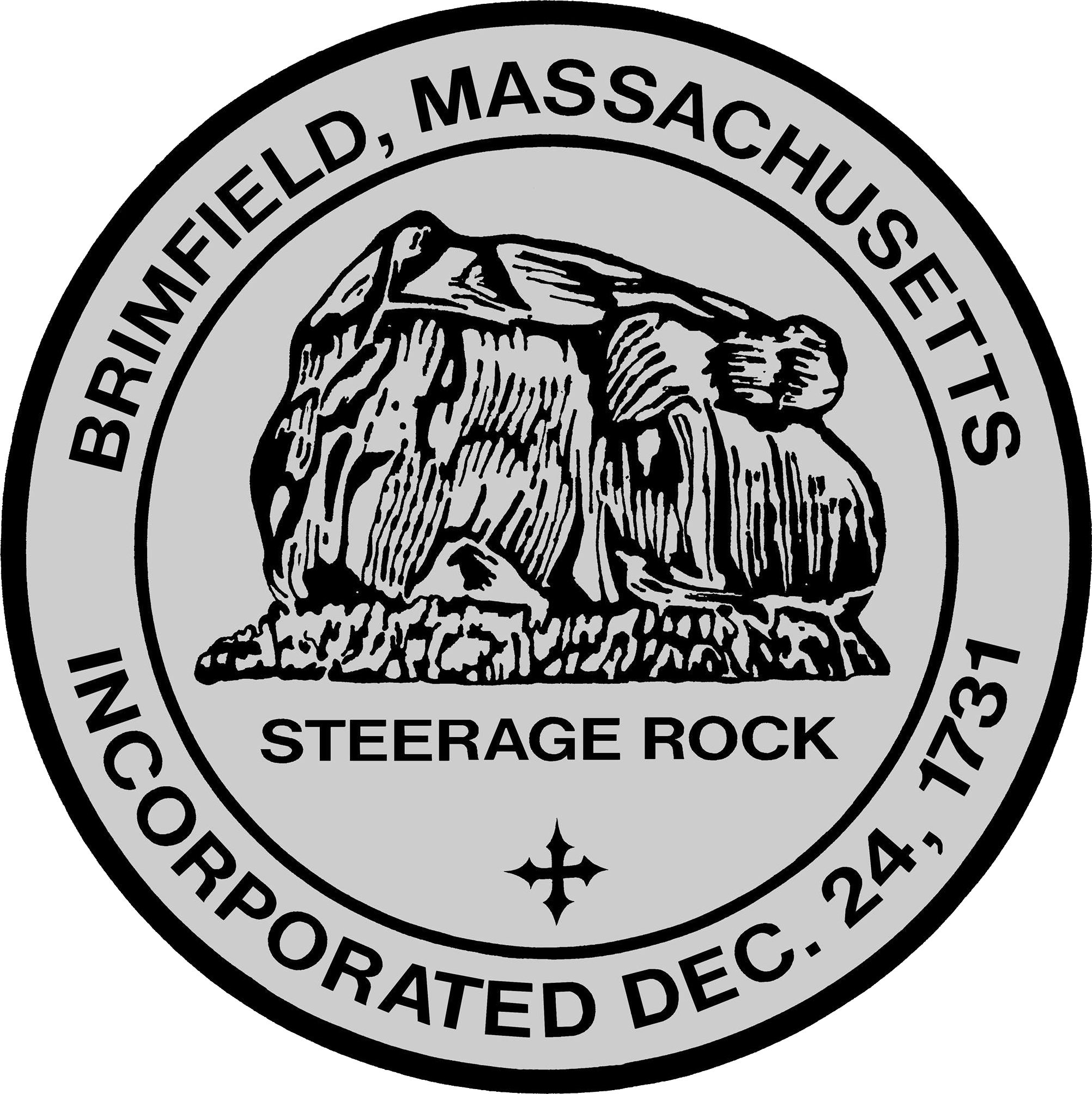
- Flag Seal

- Location in Hampden County in Massachusetts
- Coordinates: 42°7′22″N 72°12′5″W
- Country: United States
- State: Massachusetts
- County: Hampden
- Settled: 1706
- Incorporated: 1731

Government
  - Type: Open town meeting

Area
  - Total: 35.2 sq mi (91.2 km^{2})
  - Land: 34.7 sq mi (89.9 km^{2})
  - Water: 0.50 sq mi (1.3 km^{2})
- Elevation: 669 ft (204 m)

Population (2020)
  - Total: 3,772
  - Density: 109/sq mi (42.0/km^{2})
- Time zone: UTC-5 (Eastern)
  - Summer (DST): UTC-4 (Eastern)
- ZIP code: 01010
- Area code: 413
- FIPS code: 25-08470
- GNIS feature ID: 0619384
- Website: www.brimfieldma.org

Brimfield is a town in Hampden County, Massachusetts, United States. The population was 3,694 at the 2020 census. It is part of the Springfield, Massachusetts Metropolitan Statistical Area.

== History ==
Brimfield was first settled in 1706 and was officially incorporated in 1731. Until 1812, Brimfield was originally part of Hampshire County. The original Hampshire County included territory that is now in modern-day Hampden County, Franklin County, and Berkshire County as well as small parts of modern-day Worcester County.

== Geography ==
According to the United States Census Bureau, the town has a total area of 35.2 square miles (91 km^{2}), of which 34.7 square miles (90 km^{2}) is land and 0.5 square miles (1.3 km^{2}) (1.45%) is water. Brimfield is located in Western Massachusetts. Brimfield is bordered by Sturbridge on the east, Holland and Wales on the south, Monson and Palmer on the west, and Warren on the north. U.S. Route 20 and Route 19 both run through Brimfield. Interstate 90 cuts through the northern portion of the town in two sections.

Brimfield is located 22 miles (35 km) away from Springfield, 25 miles (40 km) away from Worcester, 41 miles (66 km) away from Hartford, 65 miles (105 km) away from Boston, 105 miles (169 km) from Albany, 71 miles (114 km) away from Pittsfield and 153 miles (246 km) from New York City.

== Education ==
Brimfield Elementary School, serving grades K–6, has its own school committee, part of School Union 61. Brimfield students attend Tantasqua Regional Junior High School (grades 7–8) and Tantasqua Regional High School in Sturbridge. Union 61 and the Tantasqua district share administrators, including the superintendent, and both include Brimfield, Brookfield, Holland, Sturbridge, and Wales.

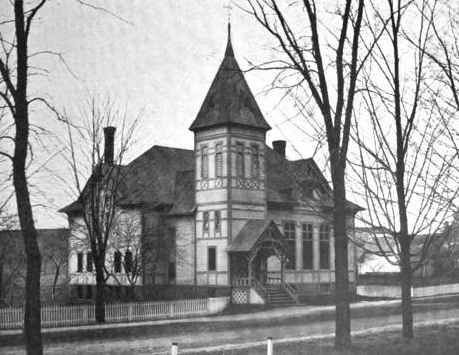
Brimfield Town Hall, 1899

== Library ==
The Brimfield Public Library was established by the dog tax. This had been allowed to accumulate in the town treasury until it amounted to $709.19, when, on April 9, 1877, the town voted to devote it to establishing a free public library; and a room was specially fitted up for it in the new town house, which was built in 1879. In fiscal year 2008, the town of Brimfield spent 0.98% ($79,593) of its budget on its public library—some $21 per person.

== Demographics ==
Historical population
Year	Pop.	±%
1790	1,211	—
1850	1,420	+17.3%
1860	1,363	−4.0%
1870	1,288	−5.5%
1880	1,203	−6.6%
1890	1,288	+7.1%
1900	941	−26.9%
1910	866	−8.0%
1920	778	−10.2%
1930	884	+13.6%
1940	1,012	+14.5%
1950	1,182	+16.8%
1960	1,414	+19.6%
1970	1,907	+34.9%
1980	2,318	+21.6%
1990	3,001	+29.5%
2000	3,339	+11.3%
2010	3,609	+8.1%
2020	3,694	+2.4%
2022*	3,690	−0.1%
* = population estimate. Source: United States census records and Population Estimates Program data.

As of the census of 2000, there were 3,339 people, 1,250 households, and 886 families residing in the town. The population density was 96.2 inhabitants per square mile (37.1/km^{2}). There were 1,396 housing units at an average density of 40.2 per square mile (15.5/km^{2}). The racial makeup of the town was 97.69% White, 0.51% African American, 0.36% Native American, 0.06% Asian, 0.06% Pacific Islander, 0.72% from other races, and 0.60% from two or more races. Hispanic or Latino of any race were 1.29% of the population.

There were 1,250 households, out of which 35.4% had children under the age of 18 living with them, 61.1% were married couples living together, 6.9% had a female householder with no husband present, and 29.1% were non-families. 23.1% of all households were made up of individuals, and 11.2% had someone living alone who was 65 years of age or older. The average household size was 2.67 and the average family size was 3.21.

In the town, the population was spread out, with 27.3% under the age of 18, 5.7% from 18 to 24, 28.9% from 25 to 44, 27.0% from 45 to 64, and 11.0% who were 65 years of age or older. The median age was 39 years. For every 100 females, there were 98.2 males. For every 100 females age 18 and over, there were 97.2 males.

The median income for a household in the town was $50,181, and the median income for a family was $59,943. Males had a median income of $44,000 versus $26,695 for females. The per capita income for the town was $23,711. About 2.2% of families and 4.4% of the population were below the poverty line, including 2.8% of those under age 18 and 3.8% of those age 65 or over.

== Points of interest ==
- Brimfield Antique Show – Brimfield is the site of the largest outdoor antiques show in New England. It takes place three times each year, for six days in May, July, and September.
- The Brimfield Trail is part of a planned trail system running from Palmer to Franklin. Currently a 2-mile section is open for walking and bicycling (fat tire) on the flood control land of the East Brimfield Dam.

== Notable people ==
- Tabitha Moffatt Brown, mother of Oregon and founder of Tualatin Academy
- William Eaton, military adventurer during the Barbary Wars
- Erastus Fairbanks, former governor of Vermont and a founder of the Republican Party
- John Wells Foster, geologist, paleontologist and Massachusetts politician
- Richard Nelson Frye, scholar of Iranian and Central Asian Studies
- Samuel Hitchcock was an attorney and judge in Vermont
- Charles McEwen Hyde, early missionary in Hawaii, originally ordained in Brimfield
- Erasmus D. Keyes, military General who led the Army of the Potomac during the Civil War
- Nathaniel Raymond, human rights investigator and anti-torture advocate
- Fitz Henry Warren, Iowa State Senator and United States Minister to Guatemala
- Matt Shaw, Major League Baseball player for the Chicago Cubs
