= Holland, Massachusetts =

- Town
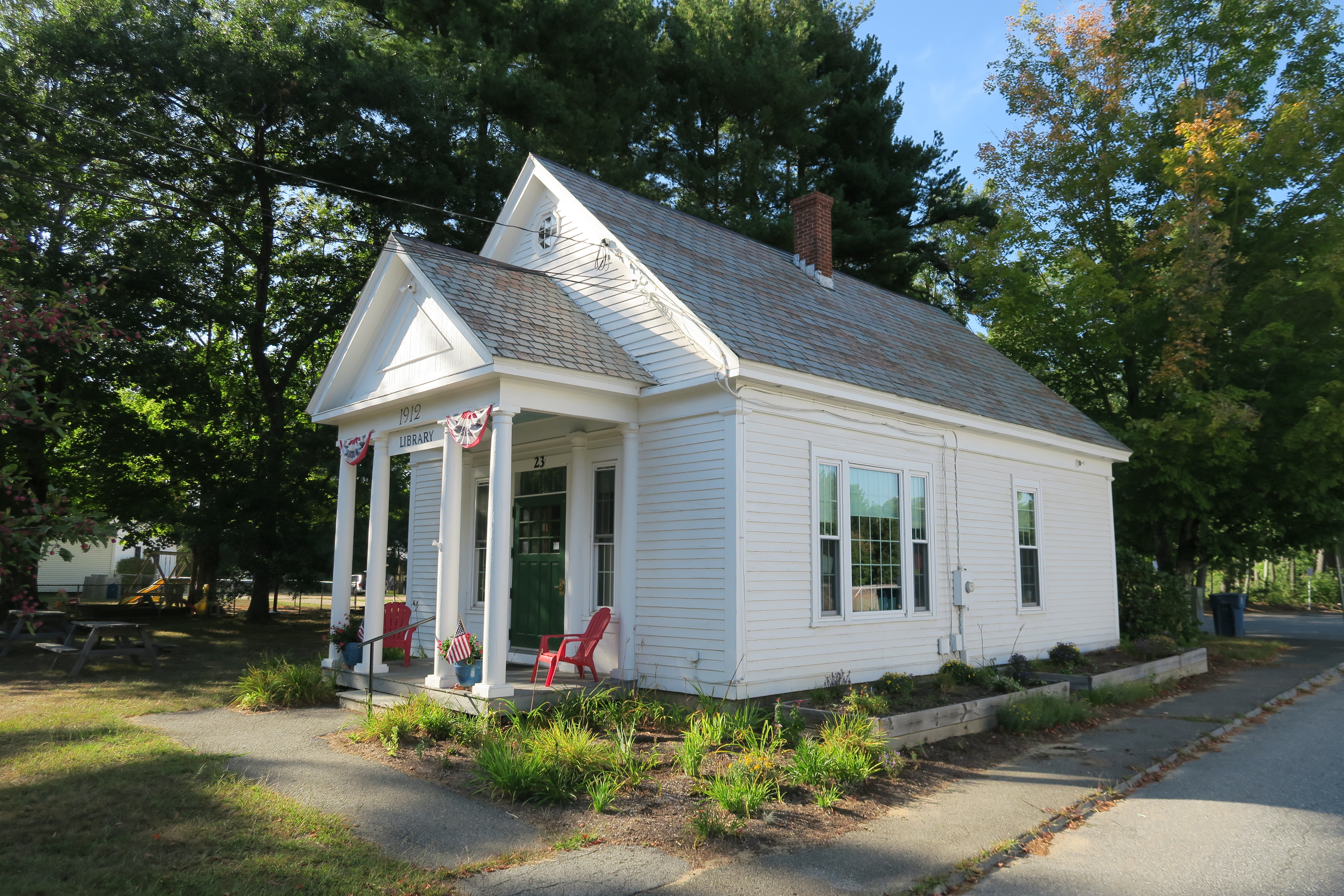
- Holland Public Library

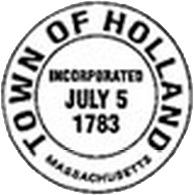
- Seal

- Location in Hampden County in Massachusetts
- Coordinates: 42°03′50″N 72°09′28″W
- Country: United States
- State: Massachusetts
- County: Hampden
- Settled: 1725
- Incorporated: 1783

Government
  - Type: Open town meeting

Area
  - Total: 13.1 sq mi (33.8 km^{2})
  - Land: 12.3 sq mi (31.8 km^{2})
  - Water: 0.77 sq mi (2.0 km^{2})
- Elevation: 741 ft (226 m)

Population (2020)
  - Total: 2,603
  - Density: 212/sq mi (81.9/km^{2})
- Time zone: UTC-5 (Eastern)
  - Summer (DST): UTC-4 (Eastern)
- ZIP Code: 01521
- Area code: 413
- FIPS code: 25-30665
- GNIS feature ID: 0618185
- Website: town.holland.ma.us

Holland is a town in Hampden County, Massachusetts, United States. The population was 2,603 at the 2020 census. It is part of the Springfield, Massachusetts Metropolitan Statistical Area.

The area around the town center comprises the census-designated place of Holland.

== History ==
In 1730, the area that would become the town of Holland was settled by Joseph Blodgett, whose descendants still live in the town today. The town was named after Lord Holland, an English statesman who lobbied for independence for the American colonies. The town was incorporated on July 5, 1783. It separated from the town of Wales, which had in turn separated from Brimfield a few years earlier, in 1775. Holland separated from Wales because the town center of Wales was up through a mountain which made it hard to get through.

Throughout the years, Holland has remained an example of the charm and beauty of the traditional New England village. At different times, it has sustained industries such as farming, the manufacturing of cloth, and brickmaking. Holland is now known most for its recreational opportunities. There are extensive recreational facilities at the Hamilton Reservoir, which is stocked with trout each year by the state of Massachusetts. There is also a park and a swimming area at the picturesque Lake Siog.

The 200-year-old town hall was destroyed in a fire in December 1995. The new town hall was dedicated on July 11, 1998, by Congressman Richard Neal of Springfield, whose congressional district includes Holland.

== Geography ==
Holland is located in the southeastern corner of Hampden County in western Massachusetts. It is drained by the Quinebaug River and contains the Hamilton Reservoir, one of the largest reservoirs in southern New England. The town is nestled amongst two hill ranges, where elevations reach up to greater than 1,100 feet (340 m), for example on Rattlesnake Mountain in the northwest part of town.

According to the United States Census Bureau, the town has a total area of 13.1 square miles (33.8 km^{2}), of which 12.3 square miles (31.8 km^{2}) are land and 0.77 square miles (2.0 km^{2}), or 5.88%, are water. Holland is bounded on the east by Sturbridge in Worcester County, on the south by Union, Connecticut, on the west by Wales, and on the north by Brimfield. Holland is 32 miles (51 km) by road east of Springfield, 26 miles (42 km) southwest of Worcester, and 40 miles (64 km) northeast of Hartford, Connecticut. Interstate 84 touches the southeastern corner of Holland at the Massachusetts–Connecticut border; the closest access is from Exit 74 in Union, Connecticut.

== Demographics ==
Historical population
Year	Pop.	±%
1790	428	—
1850	449	+4.9%
1860	419	−6.7%
1870	344	−17.9%
1880	302	−12.2%
1890	201	−33.4%
1900	169	−15.9%
1910	145	−14.2%
1920	153	+5.5%
1930	137	−10.5%
1940	247	+80.3%
1950	377	+52.6%
1960	561	+48.8%
1970	931	+66.0%
1980	1,589	+70.7%
1990	2,185	+37.5%
2000	2,407	+10.2%
2010	2,481	+3.1%
2020	2,603	+4.9%
2022	2,573	−1.2%
Source: United States census records and Population Estimates Program data.

At the 2010 census, there were 2,481 people, 994 households and 697 families residing in the town. There were 1,365 housing units in the town. The racial makeup of the town was 96.9% White, 0.6% Black or African American, 0.4% Native American, 0.4% Asian, 0.4% some other race, and 1.2% from two or more races. Hispanic or Latino of any race were 2.3% of the population.

Of the 994 households, 31.5% had children under the age of 18 living with them, 56.3% were headed by married couples living together, 8.2% had a female householder with no husband present, and 29.9% were non-families. 22.1% of all households were made up of individuals, and 6.6% were someone living alone who was 65 years of age or older. The average household size was 2.50, and the average family size was 2.90.

21.2% of the population were under the age of 18, 6.9% were from 18 to 24, 25.6% were from 25 to 44, 35.3% were from 45 to 64, and 11.0% were 65 years of age or older. The median age was 42.6 years. For every 100 females, there were 107.4 males. For every 100 females age 18 and over, there were 105.7 males.

For the period 2011-15, the estimated median household income was $75,000, and the median family income was $85,952. Male full-time workers had a median income of $60,915 and females $43,922. The per capita income was $34,188. About 3.2% of families and 7.4% of the population were below the poverty line, including 3.9% of those under age 18 and 2.9% of those age 65 or over.

== Education ==
Holland Elementary School, serving grades Pre-K–6, has its own school committee, part of School Union 61. Holland students attend Tantasqua Regional Junior High School (grades 7–8) and Tantasqua Regional High School in Sturbridge. Union 61 and the Tantasqua district share administrators, including the superintendent, and both include Brimfield, Brookfield, Holland, Sturbridge and Wales.

== Notable people ==
- Carl Beane (1952–2012), announcer at Fenway Park from 2003 until his death
- Joel Crouse (born 1992), country music singer
- Dick and Rick Hoyt (1940–2021 and 1962–2023), father-and-son marathon/triathlon team
- Ephraim Paddock (1780–1859), justice of the Vermont Supreme Court
