= Sturbridge, Massachusetts =

- Town
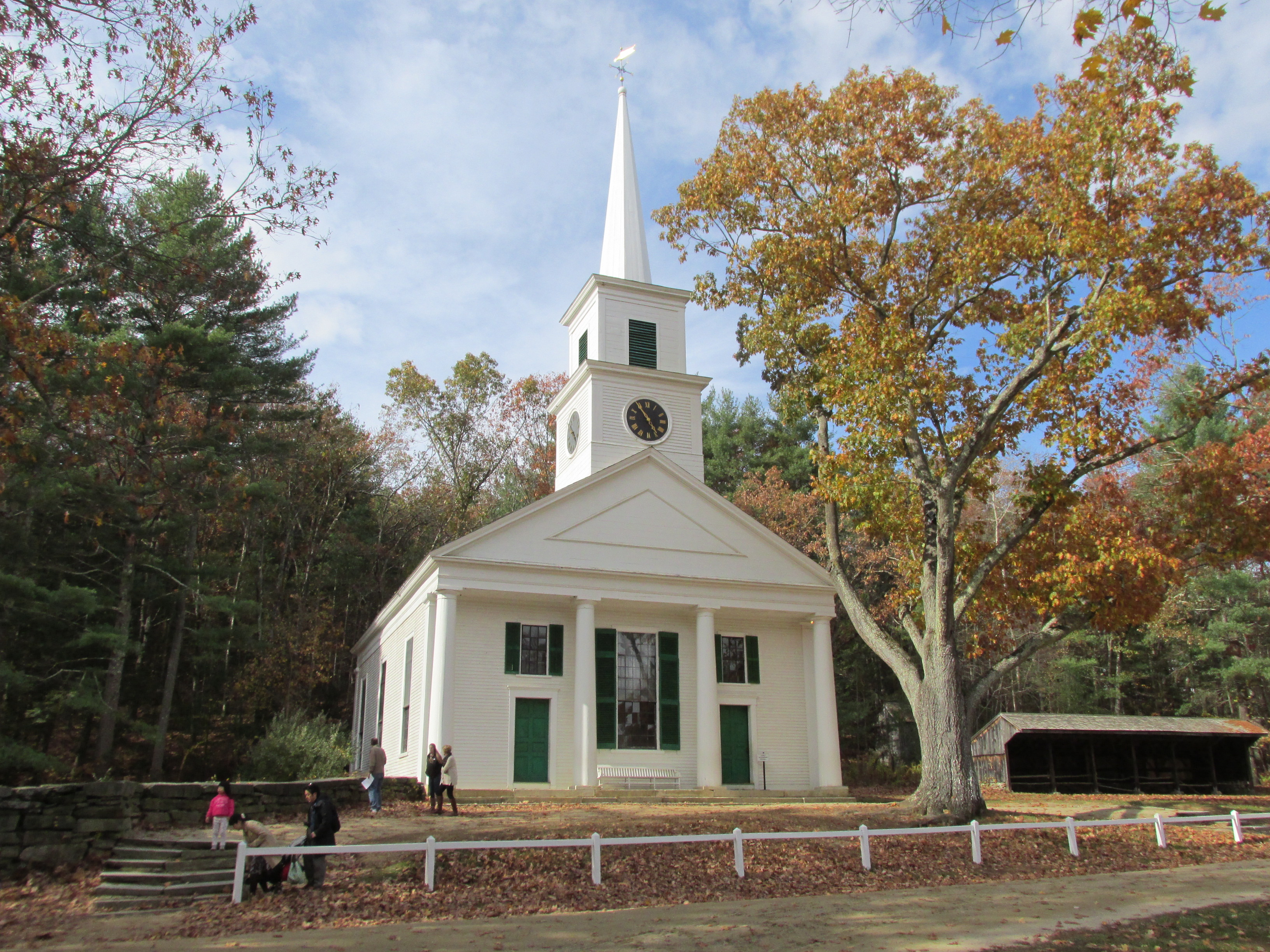
- Center Meetinghouse in Old Sturbridge Village

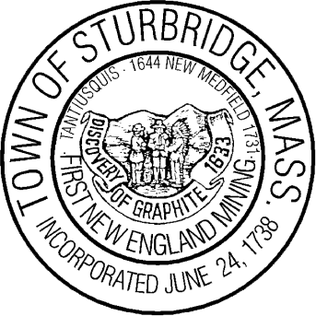
- Seal
- Motto: "First New England Mining"
- Location in Worcester County and the state of Massachusetts.
- Coordinates: 42°06′30″N 72°04′45″W
- Country: United States
- State: Massachusetts
- County: Worcester
- Settled: 1729
- Incorporated: June 24, 1738

Government
  - Type: Open town meeting
  - Town Administrator: Jeff Bridges

Area
  - Total: 39.0 sq mi (100.9 km^{2})
  - Land: 37.4 sq mi (96.9 km^{2})
  - Water: 1.5 sq mi (4.0 km^{2})
- Elevation: 620 ft (189 m)

Population (2020)
  - Total: 9,867
  - Density: 264/sq mi (102/km^{2})
- Time zone: UTC-5 (Eastern)
  - Summer (DST): UTC-4 (Eastern)
- ZIP Codes: 01566 (Sturbridge); 01518 (Fiskdale)
- Area code: 508 / 774
- FIPS code: 25-68155
- GNIS feature ID: 0618384
- Website: www.sturbridge.gov

Sturbridge is a town in Worcester County, Massachusetts, United States. It is home to Old Sturbridge Village living history museum and other sites of historical interest such as Tantiusques.

The population was 9,867 at the 2020 census, with more than 3,600 households. For geographic and demographic information on specific parts of the town of Sturbridge, see: Fiskdale and Sturbridge (CDP).

== History ==
Sturbridge was first visited by the English Puritans in 1644 when John Winthrop the Younger visited the area now known as Tantiusques. Winthrop II bought the land from Tantasqua (local area sachem) and mined graphite, lead, and iron. The mine stayed in the Winthrop family as late as 1784 and was in operation until 1910. Sturbridge was first settled by the English in 1729 by settlers from Medfield, and was officially incorporated in 1738. New Medfield and Dummer (after Governor William Dummer) were considered as town names before the town was named after Stourbridge, England.

== Geography ==
According to the United States Census Bureau, the town has a total area of 39.0 square miles (101 km^{2}), of which 37.4 square miles (97 km^{2}) is land and 1.5 square miles (4 km^{2}), or 3.95%, is water. Sturbridge is bordered by Charlton and Southbridge to the east, Union, Connecticut and Woodstock, Connecticut, to the south, Brimfield and Holland to the west, and Brookfield and East Brookfield to the north. Sturbridge lies approximately 29 miles (47 km) east of Springfield, 16 miles (26 km) southwest of Worcester, and 55 miles (89 km) west of Boston.

U.S. Route 20 runs through Sturbridge, and the junction of Interstate 90 (the Massachusetts Turnpike) and the eastern terminus of Interstate 84 is located there. The Wilbur Cross Highway (Route 15) formerly ended in Sturbridge; locals sometimes call Haynes Street and portions of Mashapaug Road "Old Route 15". Haynes Street ends at Main Street (Massachusetts Route 131), which connects Sturbridge Center with Southbridge; on the west side of town, Massachusetts Route 148 connects Fiskdale with Brookfield. On August 18, 1955, gale-force winds and torrential downpour from Hurricane Diane created floodwaters that broke dams in surrounding towns and flooded the village.

=== Neighborhoods ===
The northwestern portion of the town, Fiskdale, is a census-designated place with its own post office and ZIP Code assignment.

=== Climate ===
Climate data for Sturbridge (East Brimfield Lake), Massachusetts (1991–2020 normals, extremes 1962–present)
Month	Jan	Feb	Mar	Apr	May	Jun	Jul	Aug	Sep	Oct	Nov	Dec	Year
Record high °F (°C)	68 (20)	73 (23)	83 (28)	93 (34)	93 (34)	97 (36)	101 (38)	99 (37)	95 (35)	86 (30)	78 (26)	72 (22)	101 (38)
Mean maximum °F (°C)	56.8 (13.8)	55.6 (13.1)	64.9 (18.3)	79.1 (26.2)	86.1 (30.1)	89.1 (31.7)	91.0 (32.8)	89.1 (31.7)	85.5 (29.7)	77.4 (25.2)	68.7 (20.4)	59.1 (15.1)	93.2 (34.0)
Mean daily maximum °F (°C)	34.2 (1.2)	36.6 (2.6)	44.3 (6.8)	56.9 (13.8)	67.5 (19.7)	75.4 (24.1)	80.5 (26.9)	79.1 (26.2)	72.3 (22.4)	60.8 (16.0)	50.1 (10.1)	39.3 (4.1)	58.1 (14.5)
Daily mean °F (°C)	25.1 (−3.8)	26.7 (−2.9)	34.5 (1.4)	46.2 (7.9)	56.9 (13.8)	65.6 (18.7)	71.0 (21.7)	69.4 (20.8)	62.2 (16.8)	50.4 (10.2)	40.7 (4.8)	31.1 (−0.5)	48.3 (9.1)
Mean daily minimum °F (°C)	16.1 (−8.8)	16.9 (−8.4)	24.7 (−4.1)	35.5 (1.9)	46.2 (7.9)	55.9 (13.3)	61.5 (16.4)	59.7 (15.4)	52.2 (11.2)	39.9 (4.4)	31.3 (−0.4)	22.9 (−5.1)	38.6 (3.7)
Mean minimum °F (°C)	−4.2 (−20.1)	−2.5 (−19.2)	6.2 (−14.3)	23.9 (−4.5)	32.2 (0.1)	41.7 (5.4)	51.1 (10.6)	48.1 (8.9)	36.9 (2.7)	26.6 (−3.0)	16.0 (−8.9)	5.0 (−15.0)	−7.1 (−21.7)
Record low °F (°C)	−27 (−33)	−24 (−31)	−16 (−27)	5 (−15)	26 (−3)	32 (0)	42 (6)	33 (1)	26 (−3)	15 (−9)	−1 (−18)	−14 (−26)	−27 (−33)
Average precipitation inches (mm)	3.67 (93)	3.19 (81)	4.26 (108)	4.32 (110)	3.48 (88)	3.86 (98)	4.04 (103)	4.41 (112)	4.07 (103)	4.85 (123)	3.91 (99)	4.56 (116)	48.62 (1,234)
Average snowfall inches (cm)	13.4 (34)	16.8 (43)	13.6 (35)	3.8 (9.7)	0.0 (0.0)	0.0 (0.0)	0.0 (0.0)	0.0 (0.0)	0.0 (0.0)	0.1 (0.25)	2.0 (5.1)	13.8 (35)	63.5 (162.05)
Average extreme snow depth inches (cm)	10.1 (26)	11.6 (29)	10.5 (27)	2.3 (5.8)	0.0 (0.0)	0.0 (0.0)	0.0 (0.0)	0.0 (0.0)	0.0 (0.0)	0.0 (0.0)	1.9 (4.8)	8.6 (22)	16.8 (43)
Average precipitation days (≥ 0.01 in)	12.8	10.8	11.6	12.4	13.7	11.2	10.9	11.7	9.9	11.2	10.5	12.4	139.1
Average snowy days (≥ 0.1 in)	6.7	6.2	4.6	1.2	0.0	0.0	0.0	0.0	0.0	0.2	1.3	4.7	24.9
Source 1: NOAA
Source 2: National Weather Service

== Demographics ==
Historical population
Year	Pop.	±%
1790	1,704	—
1850	2,119	+24.4%
1860	2,291	+8.1%
1870	2,101	−8.3%
1880	2,062	−1.9%
1890	2,074	+0.6%
1900	2,058	−0.8%
1910	1,957	−4.9%
1920	1,573	−19.6%
1930	1,772	+12.7%
1940	2,227	+25.7%
1950	2,805	+26.0%
1960	3,604	+28.5%
1970	4,878	+35.3%
1980	5,976	+22.5%
1990	7,775	+30.1%
2000	7,837	+0.8%
2010	9,268	+18.3%
2020	9,867	+6.5%
2022	9,882	+0.2%
Source: United States census records and Population Estimates Program data.

By the 2010 census, the population had reached 9,268.

As of the census of 2000, there had been 7,837 people, 3,066 households, and 2,213 families residing in the town. The population density was 209.5 inhabitants per square mile (80.9/km^{2}). There were 3,335 housing units at an average density of 89.1 per square mile (34.4/km^{2}). The racial makeup of the town was 97.14% White, 3.6% Black or African American, 2.7% Native American, 1.14% Asian, 0.09% Pacific Islander, 0.31% from other races, and 0.70% from two or more races. Hispanic or Latino of any race were 1.30% of the population.

There were 3,066 households, out of which 34.2% had children under the age of 18 living with them, 60.7% were married couples living together, 8.7% had a female householder with no husband present, and 27.8% were non-families. 23.4% of all households were made up of individuals, and 9.8% had someone living alone who was 65 years of age or older. The average household size was 2.55 and the average family size was 3.03.

In the town, the population was spread out, with 25.5% under the age of 18, 5.3% from 18 to 24, 29.5% from 25 to 44, 26.4% from 45 to 64, and 13.4% who were 65 years of age or older. The median age was 39 years. For every 100 females, there were 96.9 males. For every 100 females age 18 and over, there were 93.7 males.

The median income for a household in the town was $56,519, and the median income for a family was $64,455. Males had a median income of $50,168 versus $31,940 for females. The per capita income for the town was $25,559. About 4.5% of families and 6.1% of the population were below the poverty line, including 11.3% of those under age 18 and 8.3% of those age 65 or over.

== Government ==
State government
State Representative(s):	Todd M. Smola(R)
State Senator(s):	Anne Gobi (D)
Governor's Councilor(s):	Jen Caissie (R)
Federal government
U.S. Representative(s):	1st District
U.S. Senators:	Elizabeth Warren (D), Ed Markey (D)

== Places of interest ==
Old Sturbridge Village, located on U.S. Route 20, is a living museum that re-creates life in rural New England from 1790s to the 1830s.

Tantiusques is an open-space reservation and historic site.

Wells State Park is a 1,400-acre (570 ha) woodland park and campground located on Route 49. The park includes 10 miles (16 km) of trails and Walker Pond, which offers a setting for fishing, canoeing, and swimming.

Sturbridge is the home of the Sturbridge Worship Center church which impacts wider New England.

== Education ==
Burgess Elementary School, serving grades K–6, is one of three public schools in Sturbridge. It has its own school committee, part of School Union 61. Sturbridge students also attend Tantasqua Regional Junior High School (grades 7–8) and Tantasqua Regional High School, in the Fiskdale section of town. Union 61 and the Tantasqua district share administrators, including the superintendent, and both include Brimfield, Brookfield, Holland, Sturbridge and Wales.

=== Library ===
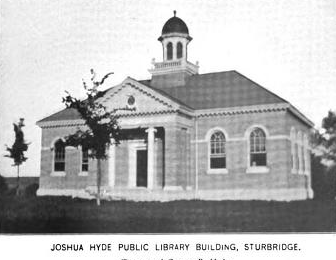
Sturbridge public library, 1899

The Sturbridge Public Library was established in 1873. In fiscal year 2008, the town of Sturbridge spent 1.51% ($332,136) of its budget on its public library, approximately $36 per person, per year ($47.44 adjusted for inflation to 2022).

== Notable people ==
- Katharine Johnson Jackson (1841–1921), physician

== See also ==
- Leadmine Wildlife Management Area
