= District No. 2 School =

District No. 2 School may refer to:

- District No. 2 School (Passadumkeag, Maine), listed on the National Register of Historic Places in Penobscot County, Maine
- District No. 2 School (Georgia, Vermont), listed on the National Register of Historic Places in Franklin County, Vermont
- District No. 2 Schoolhouse (Charlton, Massachusetts), part of Northside Village Historic District
- District No. 2 Schoolhouse, in Wakefield, New Hampshire, listed on the National Register of Historic Places in Carroll County, New Hampshire
- Gaines District No. 2 Cobblestone Schoolhouse, listed on the National Register of Historic Places in Orleans County, New York
- Grafton District Schoolhouse No. 2, in Grafton, Vermont, listed on the National Register of Historic Places in Windham County, Vermont
- District Schoolhouse No. 2, in Charlestown, Rhode Island
