= Lester Ralph =

Lester Ralph (1876 or 1877 – 1927) was an American illustrator for various publications.

== Personal life ==
Ralph was the son of author and journalist Julian Ralph. He married war correspondent Elsie Reasoner in 1904. She became a famous model and sculptor. She died in 1913 of phlebitis in Lloyd, Florida, and was buried at the Ralph family plot in New Jersey.

On September 24, 1913, Lester married Pauline Rohl. Together they had three daughters: Pauline Ralph, born March 30, 1915, Jean Ralph, born April 19, 1917, and Eileen Ralph, born March 1, 1919.

== Work ==
Illustration published in 1899

Ralph painted war scenes of the Greco-Turkish War of 1897 and First and Second Anglo-Boer wars. His classic Girl Scout poster is part of the Pritzker Military Museum & Library collection. The face from the poster was also used for Girl Scout pins.

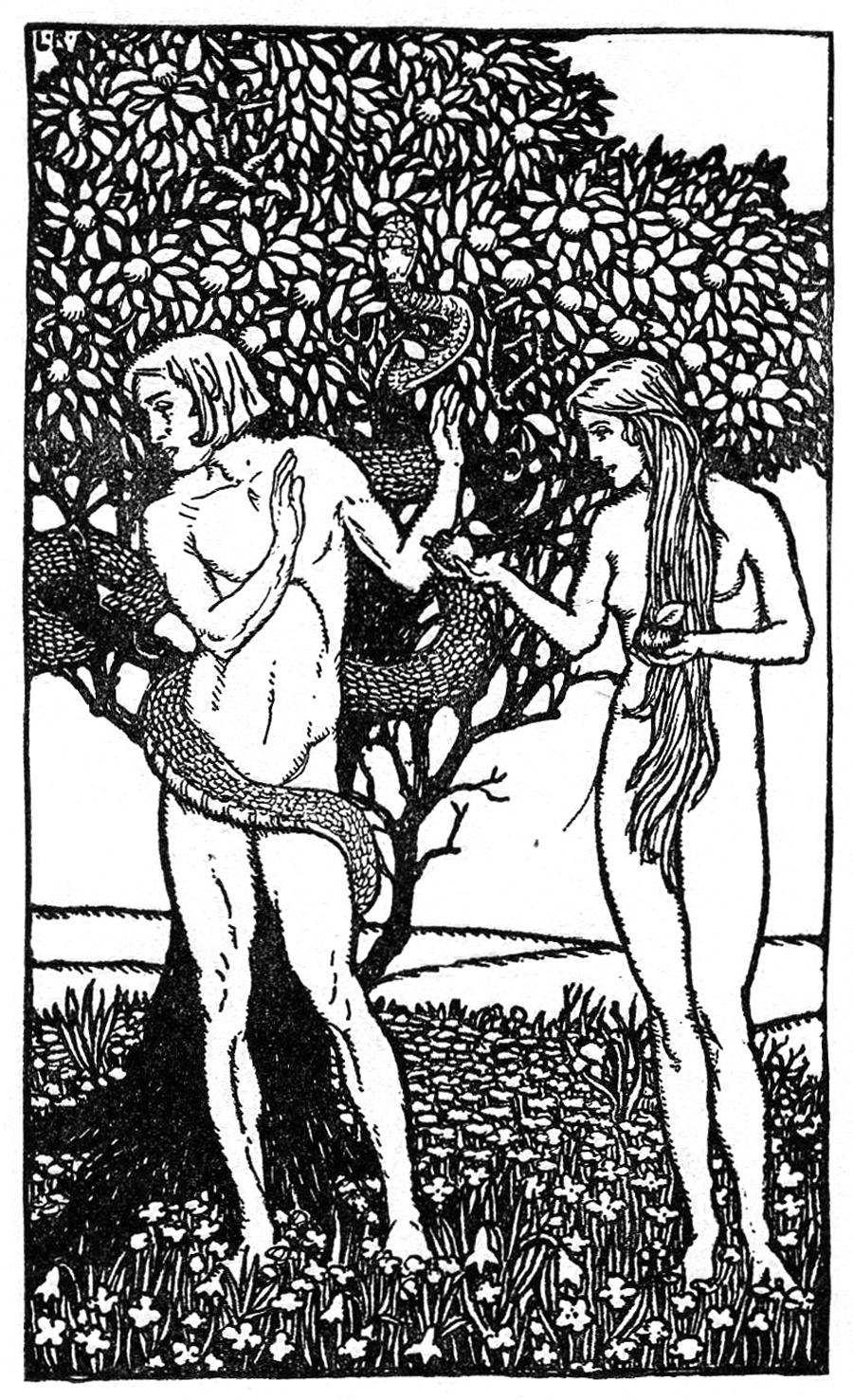
"Eve's Diary" illustration from page 12

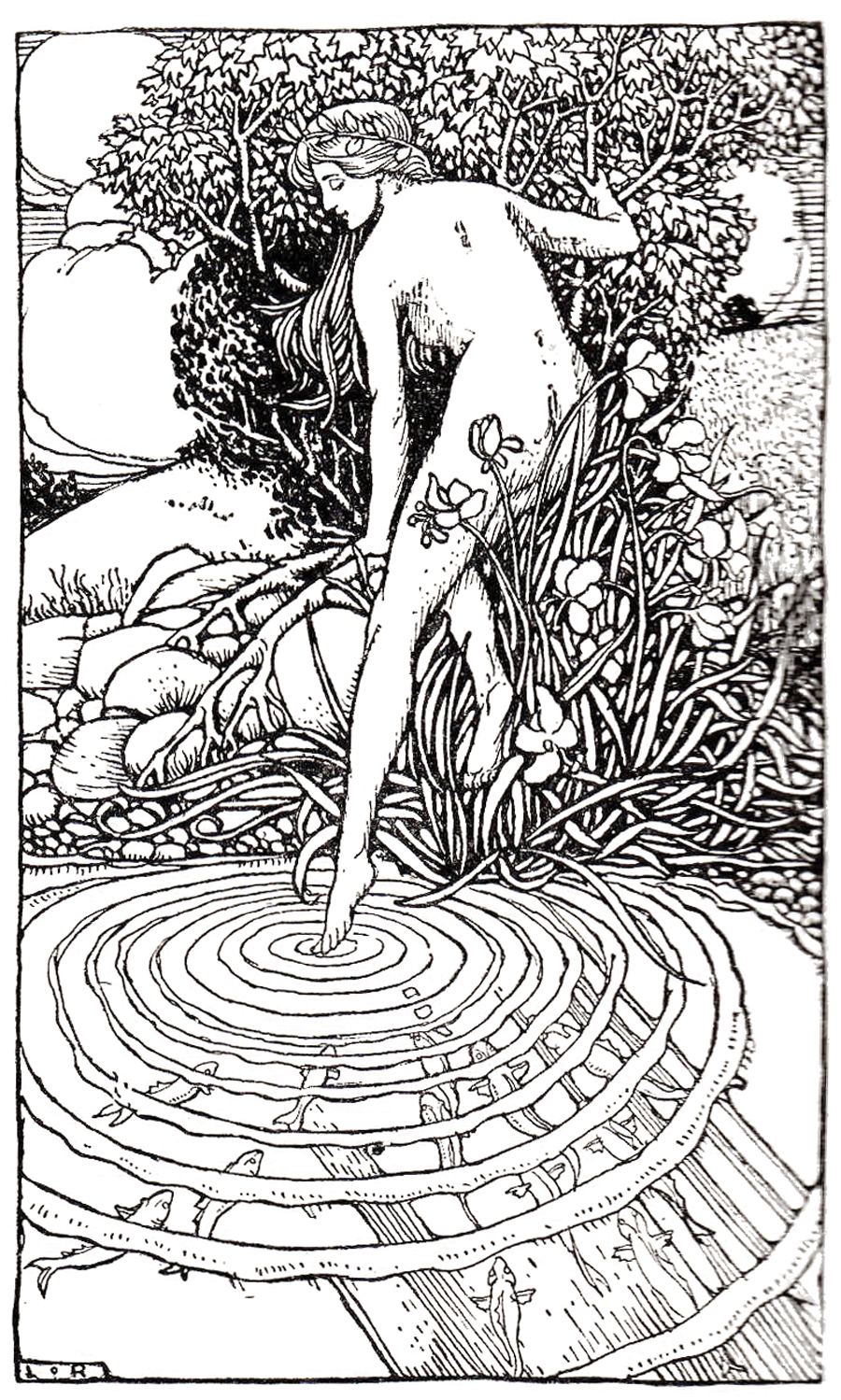
"Eve's Diary" illustration from page 42

He and W. B. Wollen designed special menu cards for a dinner of dignitaries. He illustrated his father's account "In the Wake of the War" from the Turkish side of the war with Greece.

Ralph also covered the Anglo-Boer War.

He illustrated Mark Twain's "Eve's Diary" in Harper's. The Charlton Library a Charlton, Massachusetts expelled the book after a librarian saw its nude depictions by Ralph. Twain commented amusedly on the irony of making the Bible freely available.

Ralph illustrated stories in Scribner's Magazine and Collier's, as well as Owen Wister's 1906 novel Lady Baltimore.

His illustrations of people dancing, including The One Step, featured on postcards and he also illustrated a Walk-Over shoe company catalog in 1916.

Ralph was one of the artists whose illustrations were included in the gift book A Book of Sweethearts marketed as having each picture a "climax of charm and color".

== Death ==
Ralph survived typhoid but died of appendicitis at St. Luke's Hospital in New York on April 5, 1927.

== Bibliography ==
- Lady Baltimore by Owen Wister
- Eve's Diary by Mark Twain
