= Eve's Diary =

1905 short story by Mark Twain

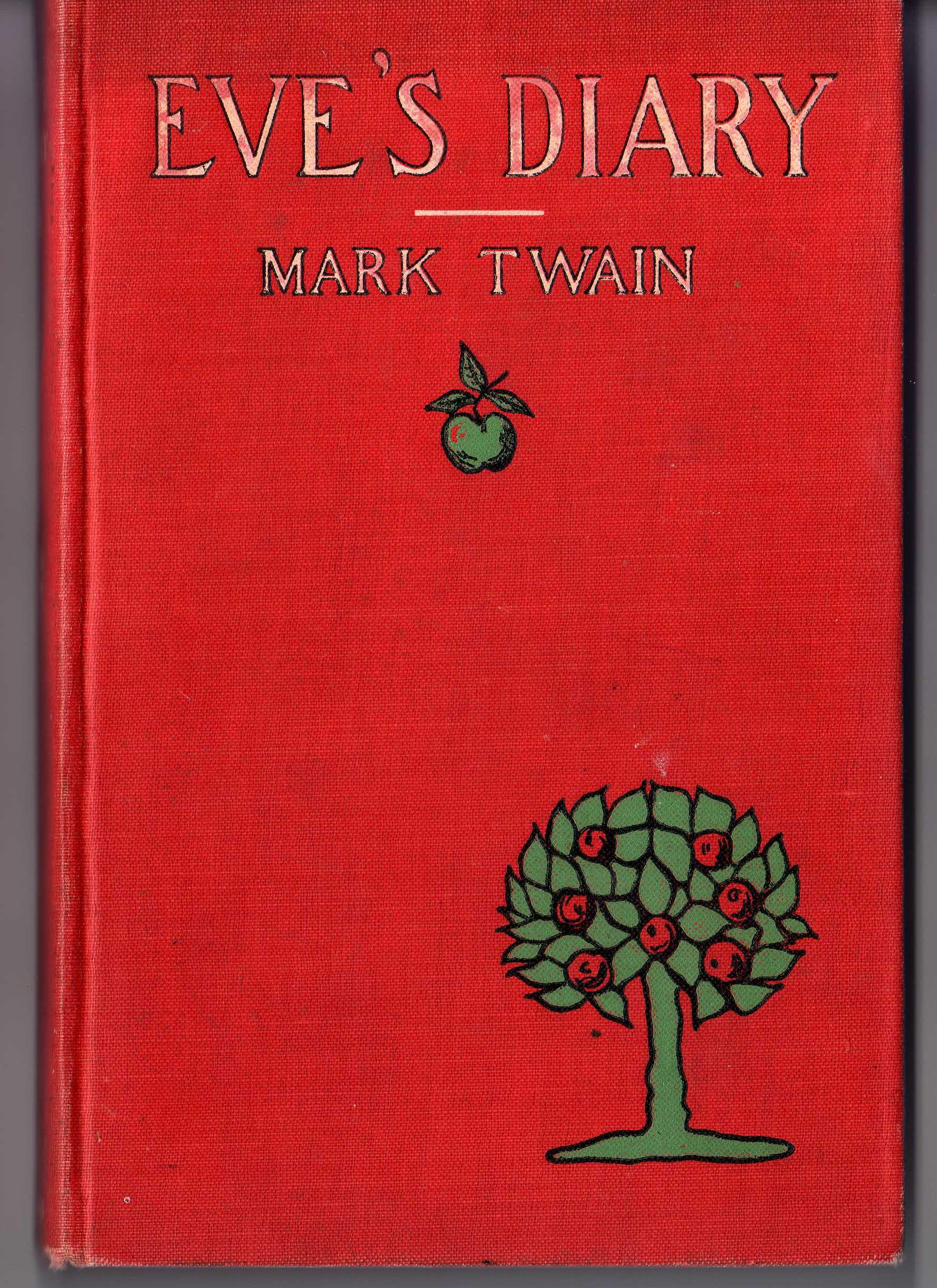
- First edition book cover
- Author: Mark Twain
- Illustrator: Lester Ralph
- Language: English
- Genre: Humor
- Publisher: Harper & Brothers
- Publication date: 1906
- Publication place: United States
- Media type: Print
- Pages: 109 pp
- Preceded by: A Dog's Tale
- Followed by: King Leopold's Soliloquy

"Eve's Diary" is a comic short story by Mark Twain. It was first published in the 1905 Christmas issue of the magazine Harper's Bazaar, in book format as one contribution to a volume entitled "Their Husband's Wives" and then in June 1906 as a standalone book by Harper and Brothers publishing house.

== Summary ==
It is written in the style of a diary kept by the first woman in the biblical creation story, Eve, and is claimed to be "translated from the original MS." The "plot" of this story is the first-person account of Eve from her creation up to her burial by her mate Adam, including meeting and getting to know him, and exploring the world around her, Eden. The story then jumps 40 years into the future after the Fall and expulsion from Eden.

It is one of a series of books Twain wrote concerning the story of Adam and Eve, including Extracts from Adam's Diary, 'That Day In Eden,' 'Eve Speaks,' 'Adam's Soliloquy,' and the 'Autobiography of Eve.' "Eve's Diary" has a lighter tone than the others in the series, as Eve has a strong appreciation for beauty and love.

The book may have been written as a posthumous love-letter to Mark Twain's wife Olivia Langdon Clemens, or Livy, who died in June 1904, just before the story was written. Mark Twain is quoted as saying, "'Eve's Diary' is finished — I've been waiting for her to speak, but she doesn't say anything more." The story ends with Adam lamenting at Eve's grave, "Wheresoever she was, there was Eden."

== Illustrations ==
The book version of the story was published with 55 illustrations by Lester Ralph, on each left hand page. The illustrations depicted Eve and Adam in their natural settings. The depiction of an unclothed woman was considered pornographic when the book was first released in the United States, and created a controversy around the book. The Charlton Public Library in Charlton, Massachusetts banned the book for the depictions of Eve in "summer costume."

When contacted Twain replied:

The action of the Charlton library was not of the slightest interest to me.

Two weeks later, after testifying before Congress, he elaborated as reported in the Washington Herald,

The whole episode has rather amused me. I have no feeling of vindictiveness over the stand of the librarians there — I am only amused. You see they did not object to my book; they objected to Lester Ralph's pictures. I wrote the book; I did not make the pictures. I admire the pictures, and I heartily approve them, but I did not make them.

It seems curious to me — some of the incidents in this case. It appears that the pictures in Eve's Diary were first discovered by a lady librarian. When she made the dreadful find, being very careful, she jumped at no hasty conclusions — not she — she examined the horrid things in detail. It took her some time to examine them all, but she did her hateful duty! I don't blame her for this careful examination; the time she spent was, I am sure, enjoyable, for I found considerable fascination in them myself.

Then she took the book to another librarian, a male this time, and he, also, took a long time to examine the unclothed ladies. He must have found something of the same sort of fascination in them that I found. Now, if the pictures were so good as to occupy their attention so long, it seems to me that they were a little selfish not to permit the rest of the city a chance instead of shutting the volume out.

Seriously, the pictures in the book are graceful and beautiful; they show fine and delicate feeling. So far from being immodest, I thought them chaste and in good taste. To the library that barred them it would, no doubt, have been satisfactory had the ladies in Eden been garbed with a fig-leaf each, but to my mind that sort of thing is only advertising immodesty.

In a handwritten inscription in the front of at least one copy of the book, he wrote:

Clothes make the man, but they do not improve the woman.

Twain commented in a letter to his friend Harriett E. Whitmore:

the truth is, that when a Library expels a book of mine and leaves an unexpurgated Bible lying around where unprotected youth and age can get hold of it, the deep unconscious irony of it delights me and doesn't anger me.

== Gallery ==
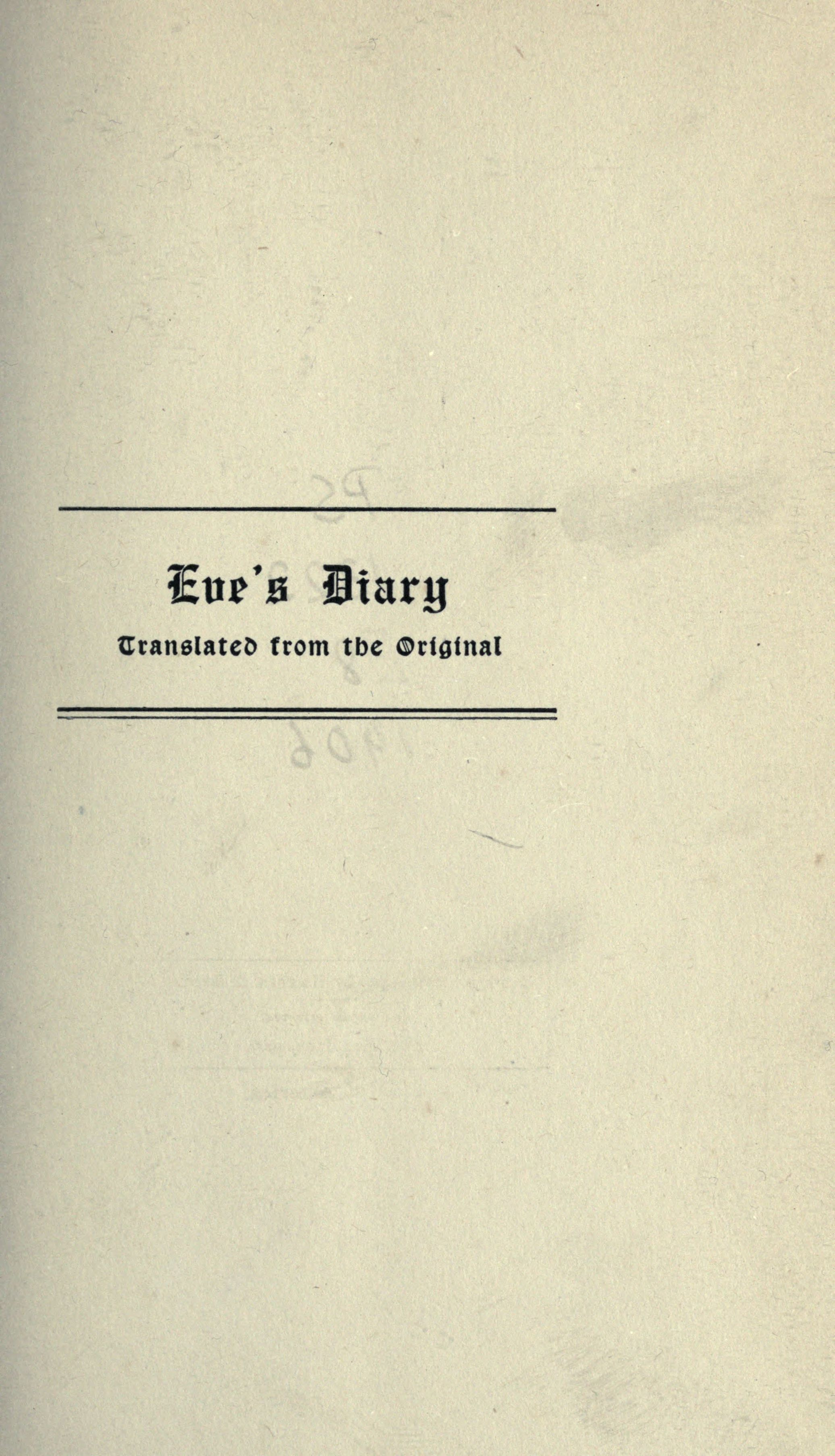
"Eve's Diary", page 1 Harper & Brothers, New York, London, 1906

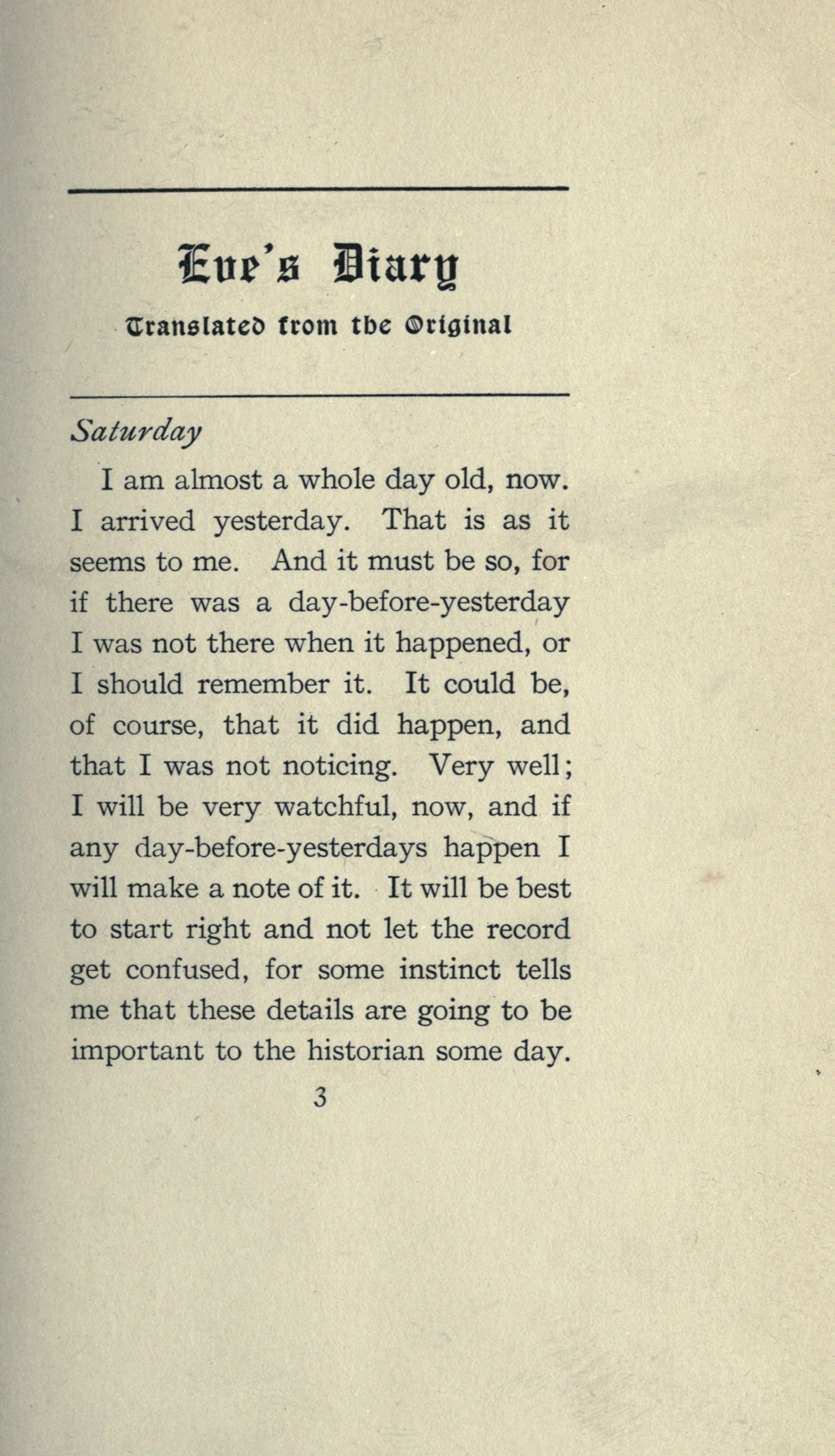
"Eve's Diary", page 3

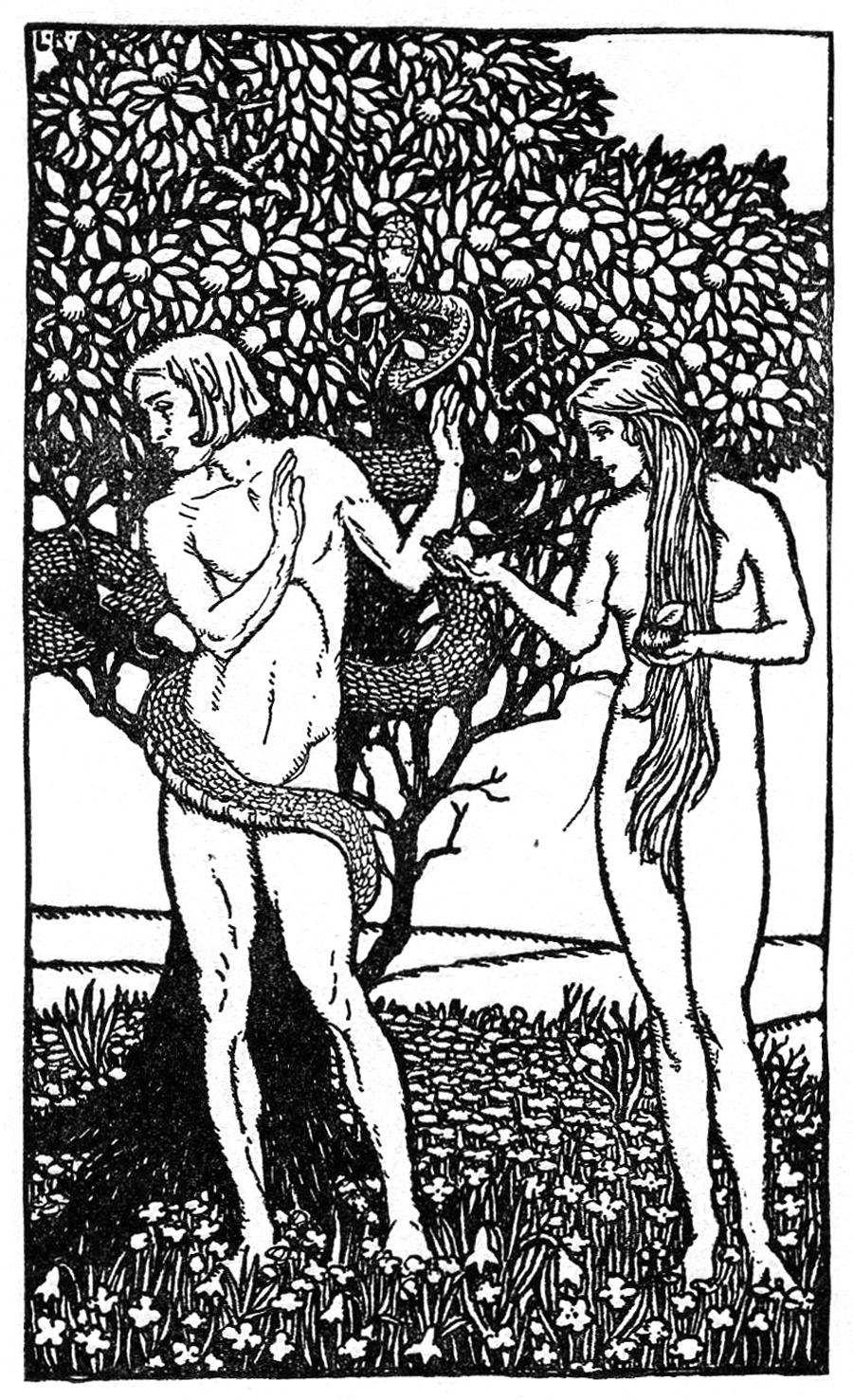
"Eve's Diary", page 12

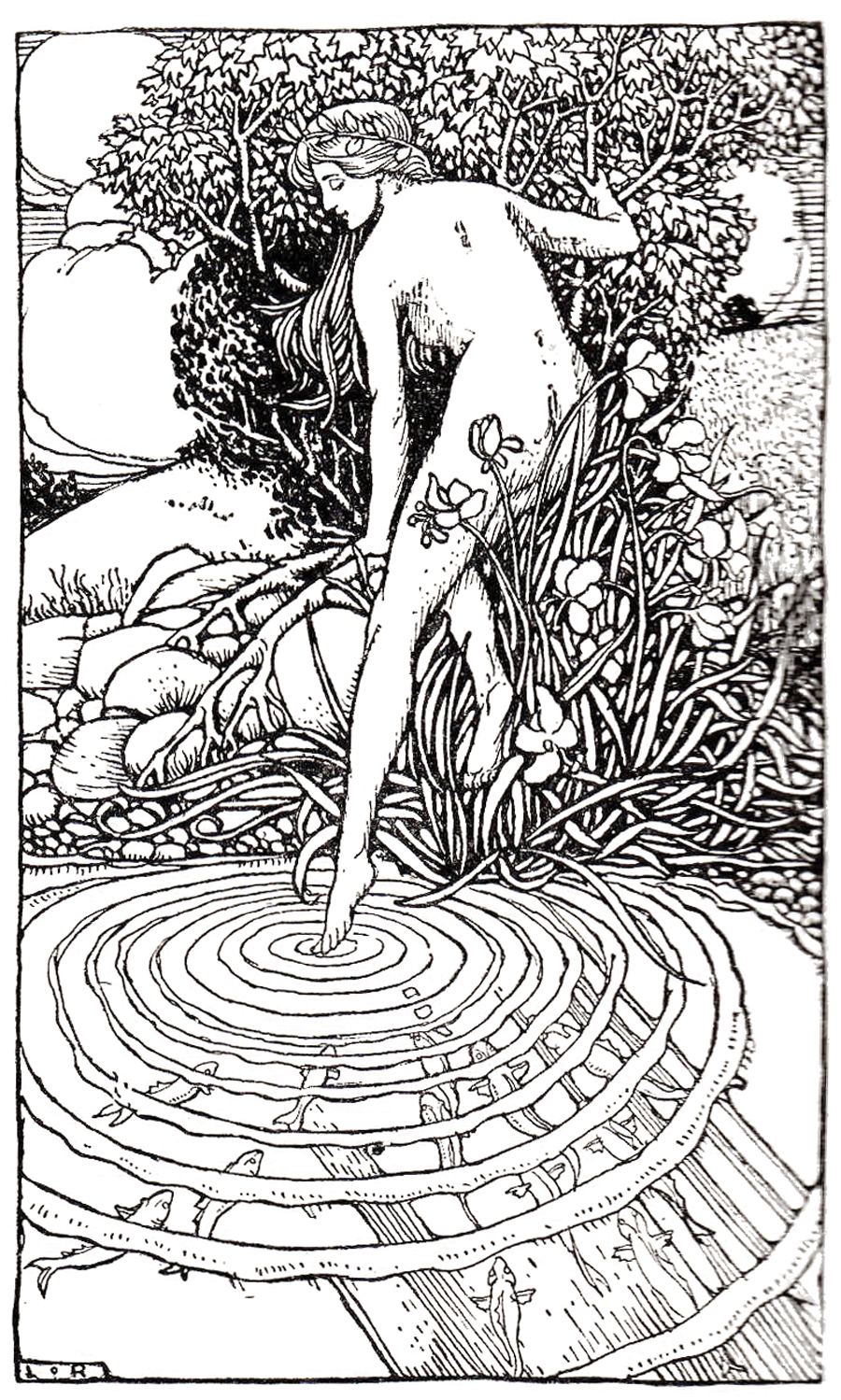
Controversial Illustration, page 42

== Stage adaptations ==
David Birney adapted the novel into a play called Mark Twain's The Diaries of Adam and Eve. Both Eve's Diary and Extracts from Adam's Diary were adapted into the first act of the stage musical The Apple Tree.
