= Elsie Reasoner Ralph =

First American female war correspondent; sculptor

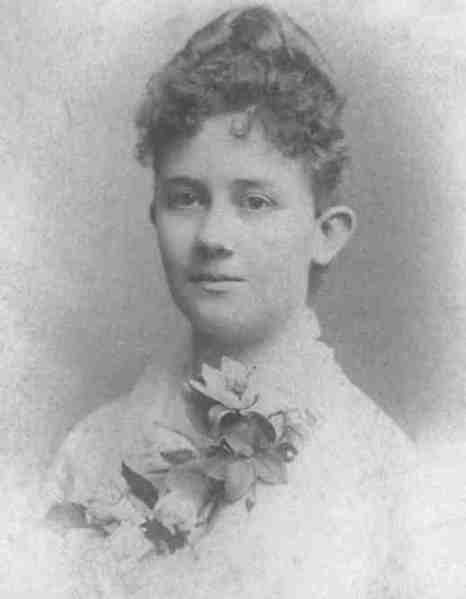
- Born: Elsie Reasoner; April 25, 1878; Osborne, Kansas, US
- Died: April 29, 1913 (aged 35); Lloyd, Florida, US
- Other name: Elsie Ralph
- Occupations: War correspondent, sculptor
- Years active: 1898–1913
- Spouse: Lester Ralph
- Relatives: Julian Ralph (father-in-law)

Elsie Reasoner Ralph (April 25, 1878 – April 29, 1913) was an American journalist from Kansas. She was a war correspondent in Cuba, reporting for McClure's magazine. After marriage she began a career as a sculptor in London.

== Early life and education ==
Reasoner was born in Osborne, Kansas, the daughter of Calvin Reasoner and Venetia Emeret Shearer Reasoner. Her father was a clergyman, judge, and editor, who served in the Kansas legislature. She was educated in Kansas and Washington, D.C.

== Career ==
Reasoner worked at newspapers in Utah, Illinois, and Nebraska. She traveled to Cuba to cover the Spanish–American War for McClure's magazine, under the cover story of being a nursing volunteer with the Red Cross, with papers signed by Clara Barton. She helped in the hospital kitchen and took photos when she could. "I got just as close to the firing line as the commanding officers would permit me to go," she recalled. "I have the satisfaction of knowing that I'm the only woman correspondent that will see this war," she wrote in 1898, from Jamaica. "They call me 'plucky' and 'courageous', but nine-tenths of the American girls would be here if they had the chance." After the war she covered the coronation of Queen Wilhelmina of the Netherlands.

Ralph moved to London and studied sculpture in Paris and Munich. She made a bust of Dillon Ripley that was exhibited in 1910. She sold a sculpted sundial to banker Otto Hermann Kahn in 1911.

== Personal life ==
In 1904, Reasoner married a fellow American, illustrator Lester Ralph, son of journalist Julian Ralph, in New York City. She died in 1913, at the age of 35, while visiting her sister and mother in Florida. Ralph and her father were both inducted into the Osborne County Hall of Fame in 1996.
