= Capen Hill Nature Sanctuary =

Nature reserve in Charlton, Massachusetts

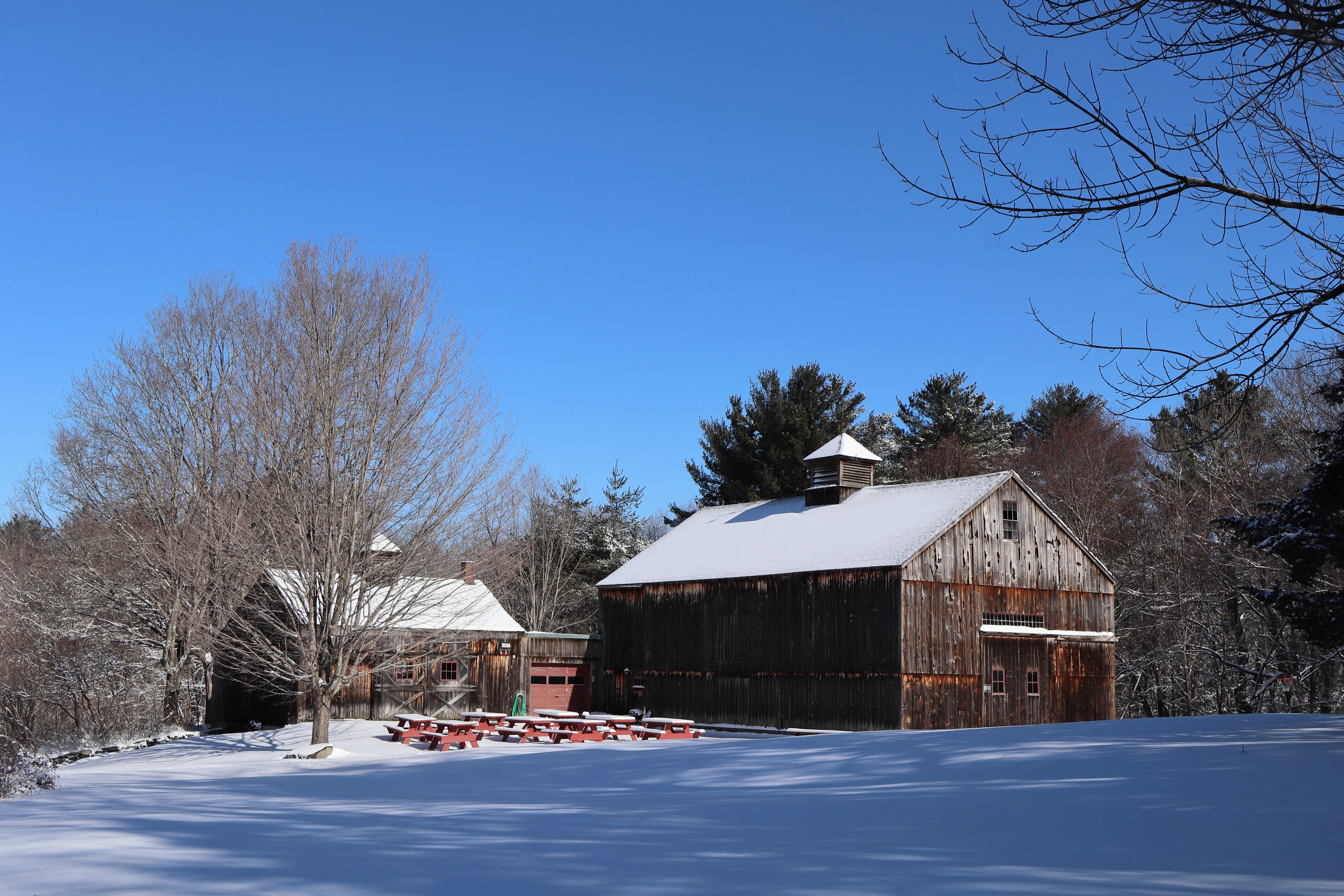
- Interactive map of Capen Hill Nature Sanctuary
- Location: Charlton, Massachusetts, US
- Coordinates: 42°08′14″N 72°00′29″W
- Area: 86 acres (35 ha)
- Created: 1977
- Founder: Ruth Dyer Wells
- Owner: Capen Hill Nature Association, Inc.
- Open: Trails open dawn to dusk. Visitor center open during business hours.
- Website: capenhill.org

Capen Hill Nature Sanctuary is an 86-acre (35 ha) non-profit nature reserve in Charlton, Massachusetts, United States. It is free and open to the public year-round, offering a series of walking trails and an educational visitor's center.

== History ==
Ruth Dyer Wells founded Capen Hill Nature Sanctuary in 1977 with a 72-acre (29 ha) parcel as a public place for animal care, nature trails, conservation, and environmental education. In addition to Wells being a philanthropist who founded Old Sturbridge Village, she had lived for several years in Charlton at Gaeville Farms, but afterward donated the land to the town. After the government of the Town of Charlton was not able to cover the costs of running it, it was turned over to a separate non-profit organization (Capen Hill Nature Association, Inc.) on March 11, 1986. In 2009, it acquired another adjacent 14 acres (5.7 ha) of land for $25,000 which expanded the property to a total of 86 acres (35 ha). Upkeep and maintenance is provided by community donations, including work from Bay Path Regional Vocational Technical High School students, Eagle Scout service projects, and donations and grants from others.

== Nature trails ==
Throughout the property are a series of short interconnected walking trails that showcase the variety of natural plants and geography in the area, including many species of common and endangered plants and animals. There is no charge to visit the sanctuary. Trails are marked with blazes made of colored shapes.

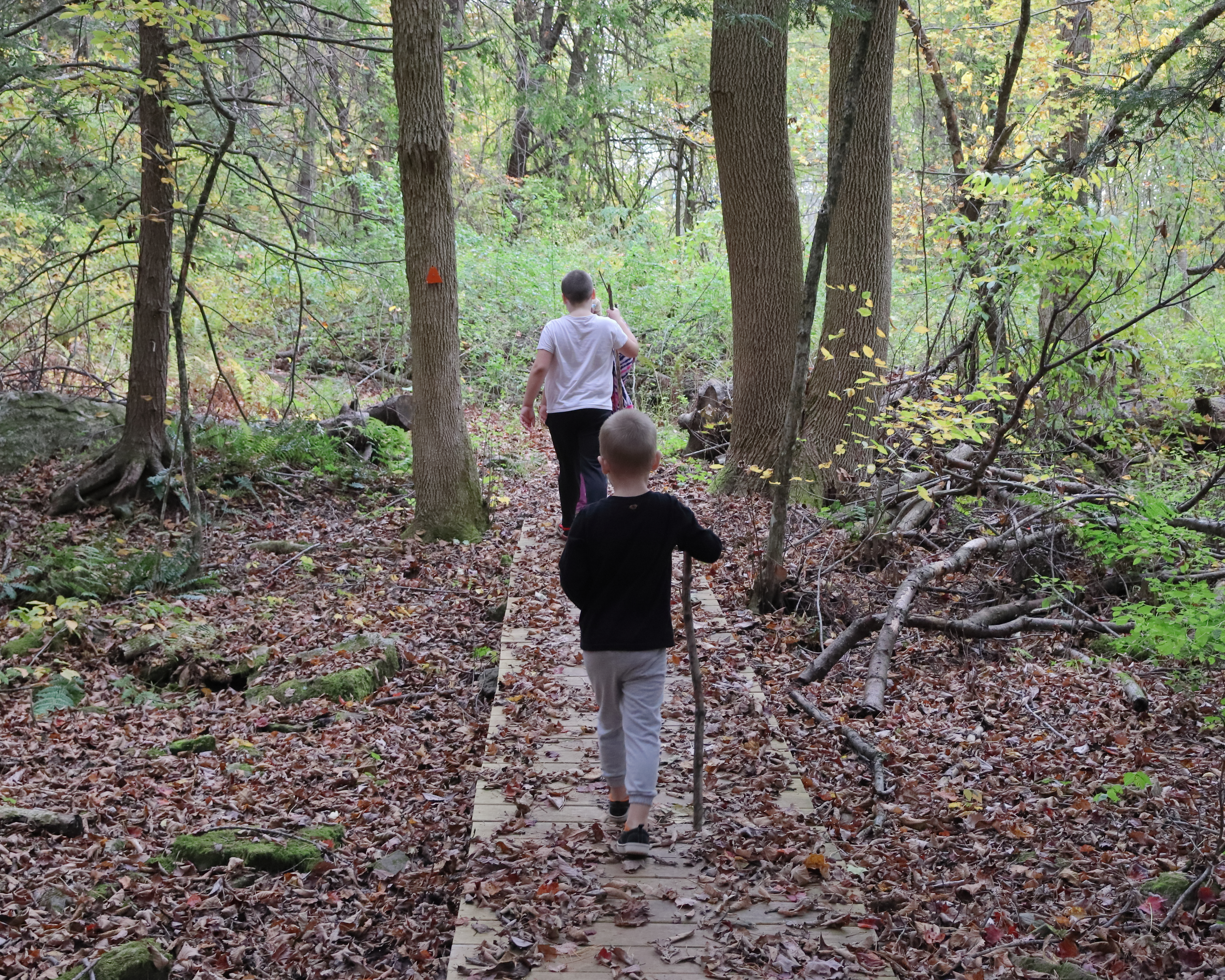
Children on Evergreen Trail's boardwalk

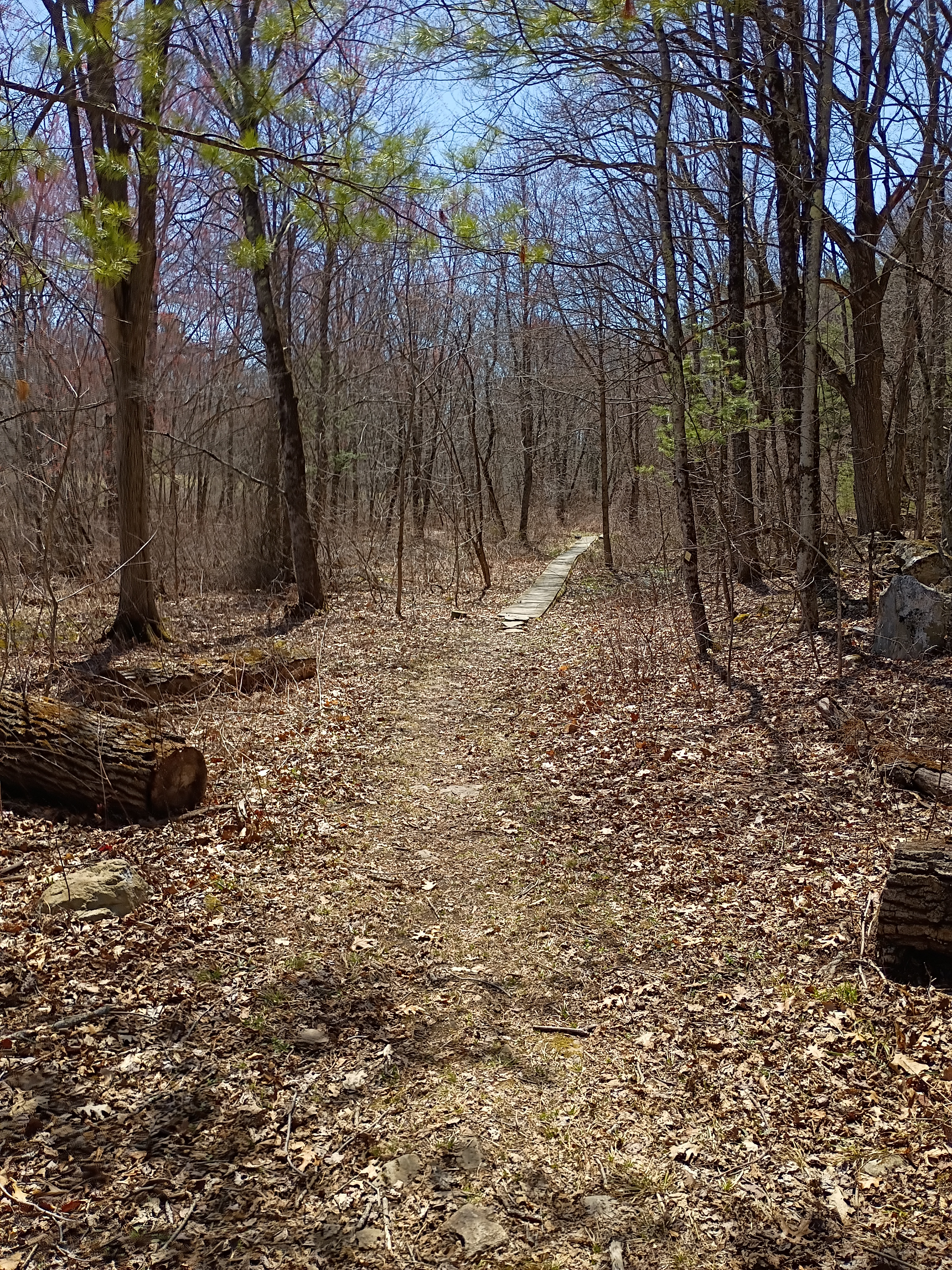
Farr Trail

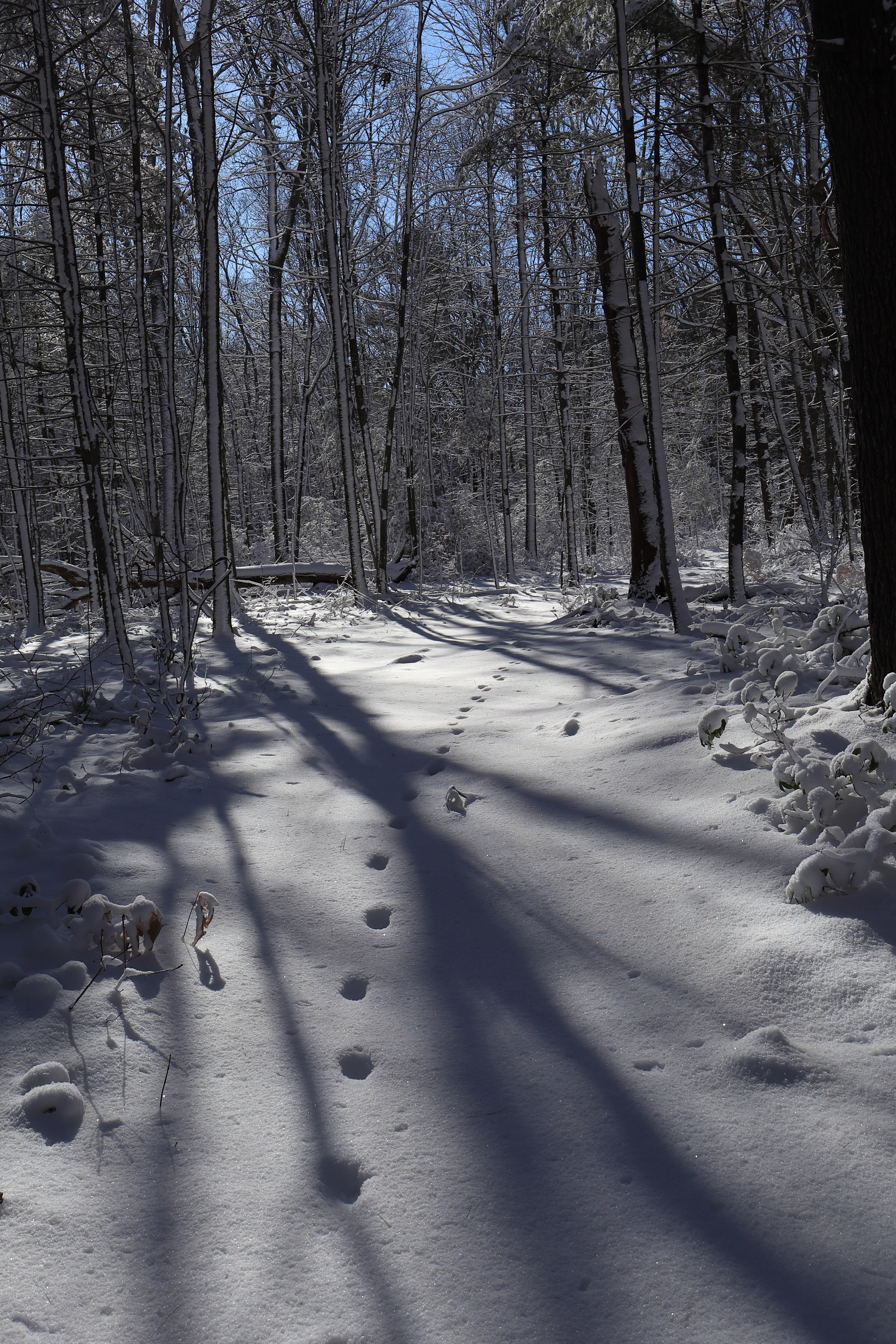
Animal tracks in the snow on Oak Ridge Trail

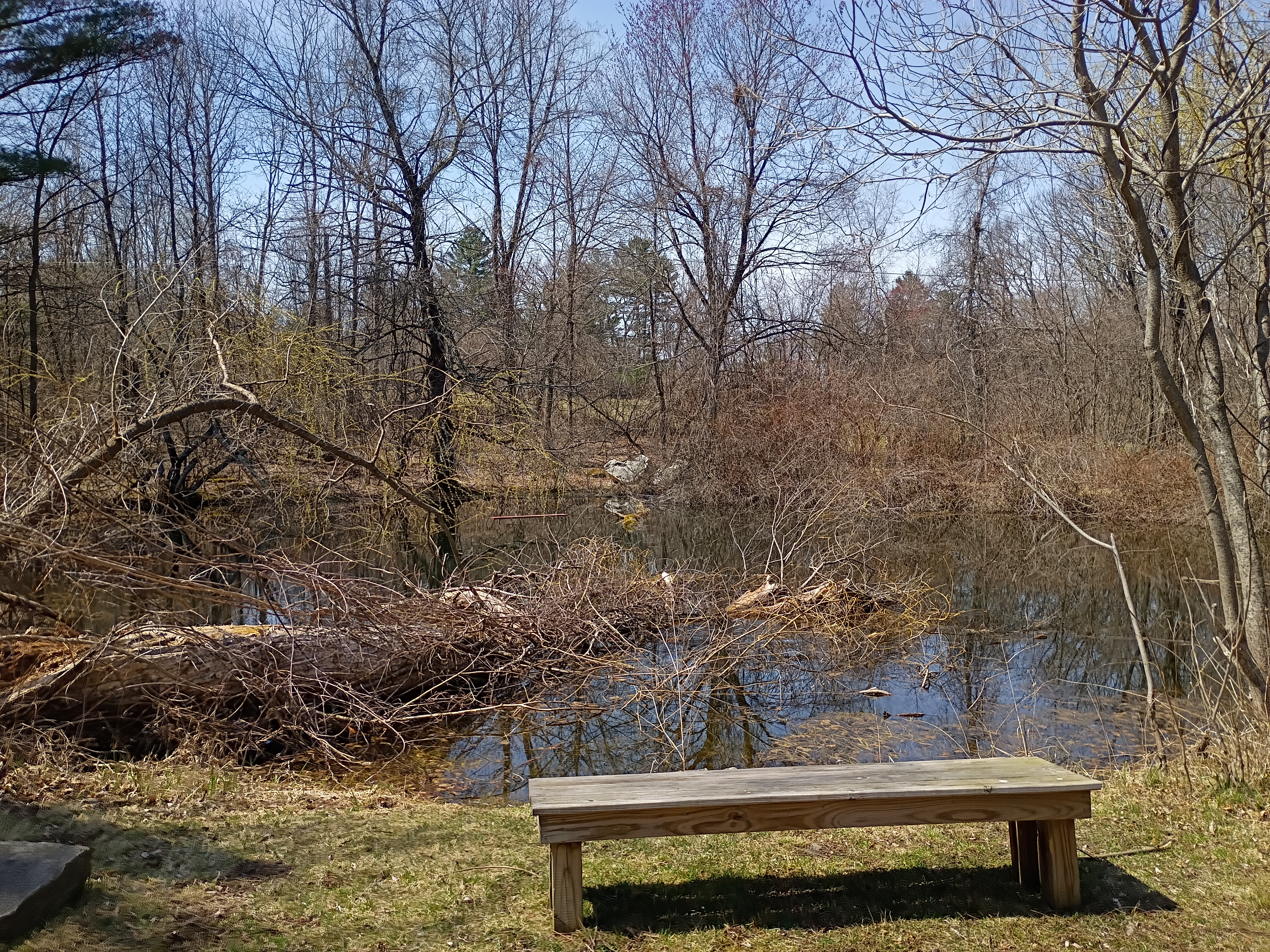
Willow Pool

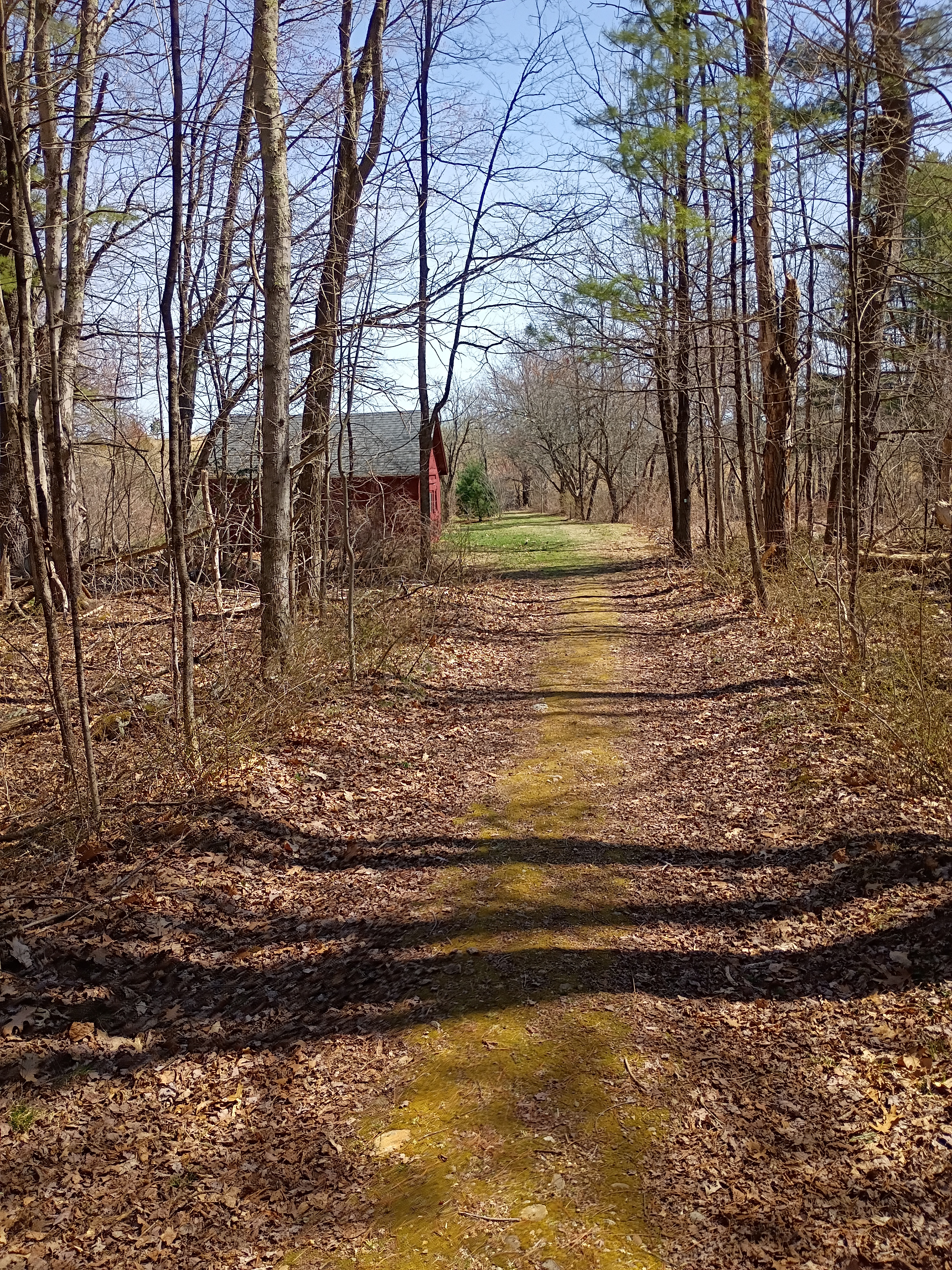
Cart path leading to a clearing

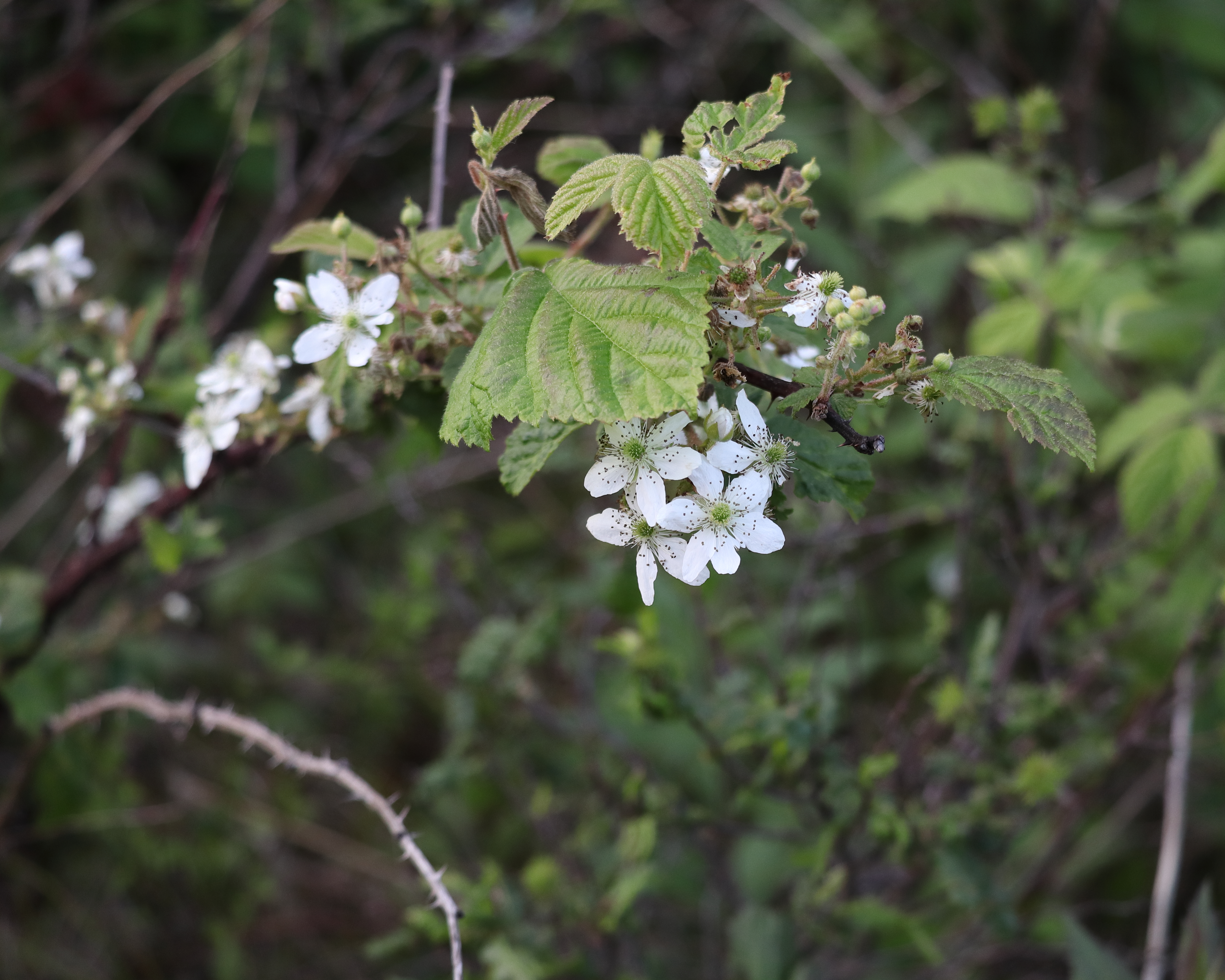
Blackberry bush flowers along High Rocks Trail

== Visitor center ==
The visitor center is converted from a 1950s residence, and is also free to visit. Sometimes when needed, the sanctuary will take in and rehabilitate injured wildlife, and the animals are used to help educate the public. During business hours, visitors can meet around 40 rescue animals, including a variety of birds, reptiles, rabbits, bearded dragons, and axolotls. There is also a domesticated rat named George. The visitor center also has a library, mineral collection, and gift shop.

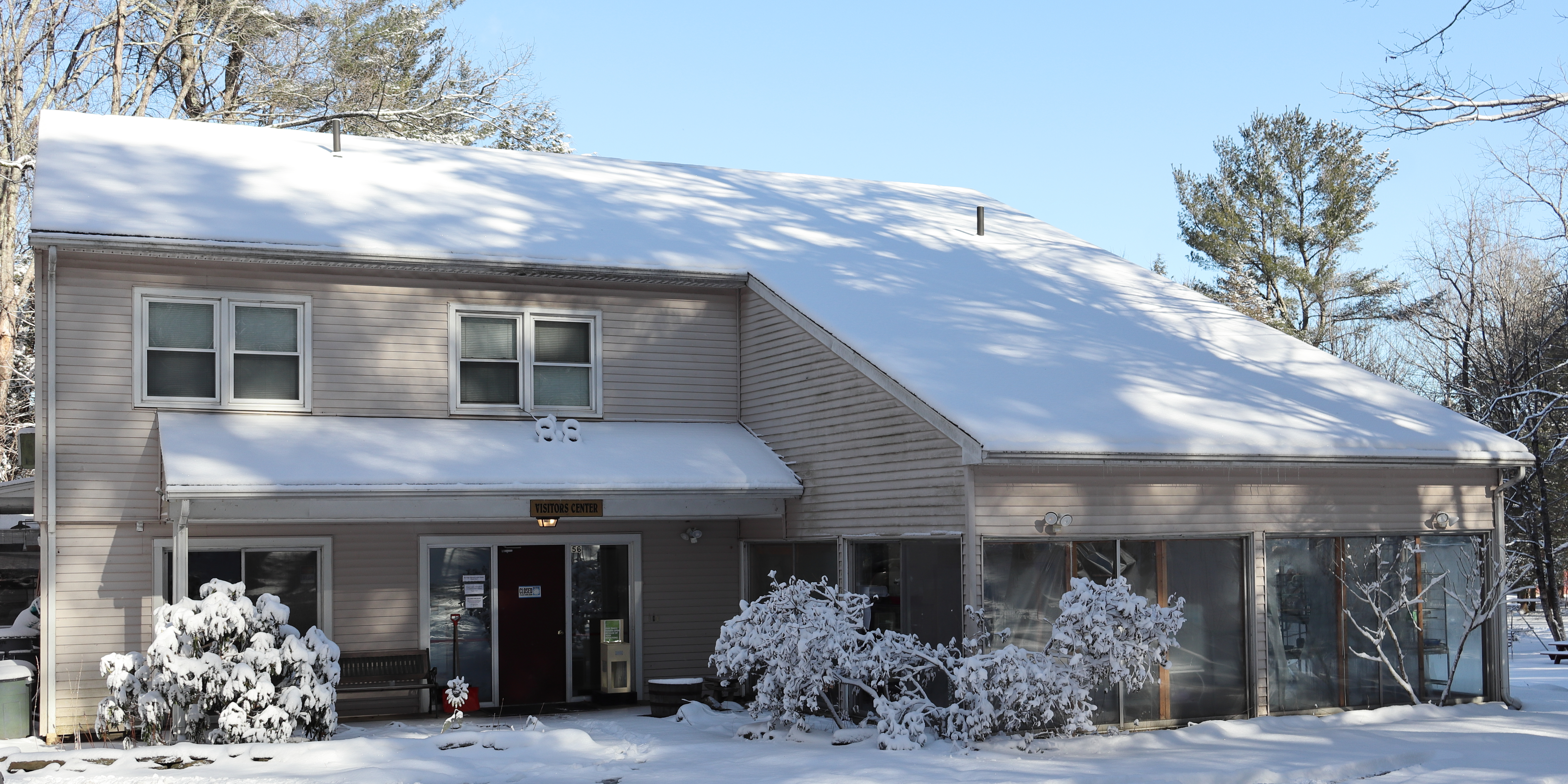
Visitor center

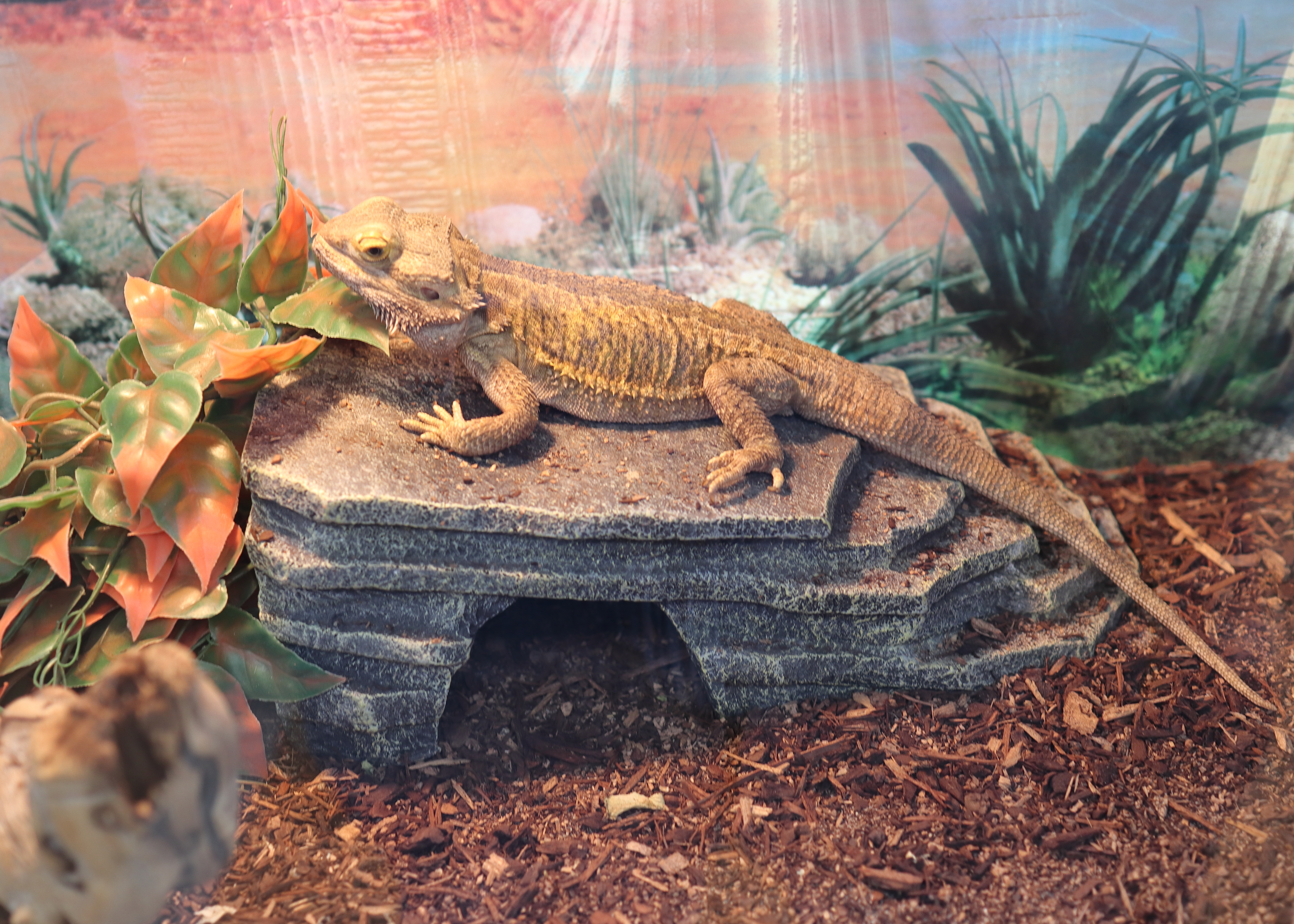
Anton the Bearded Dragon

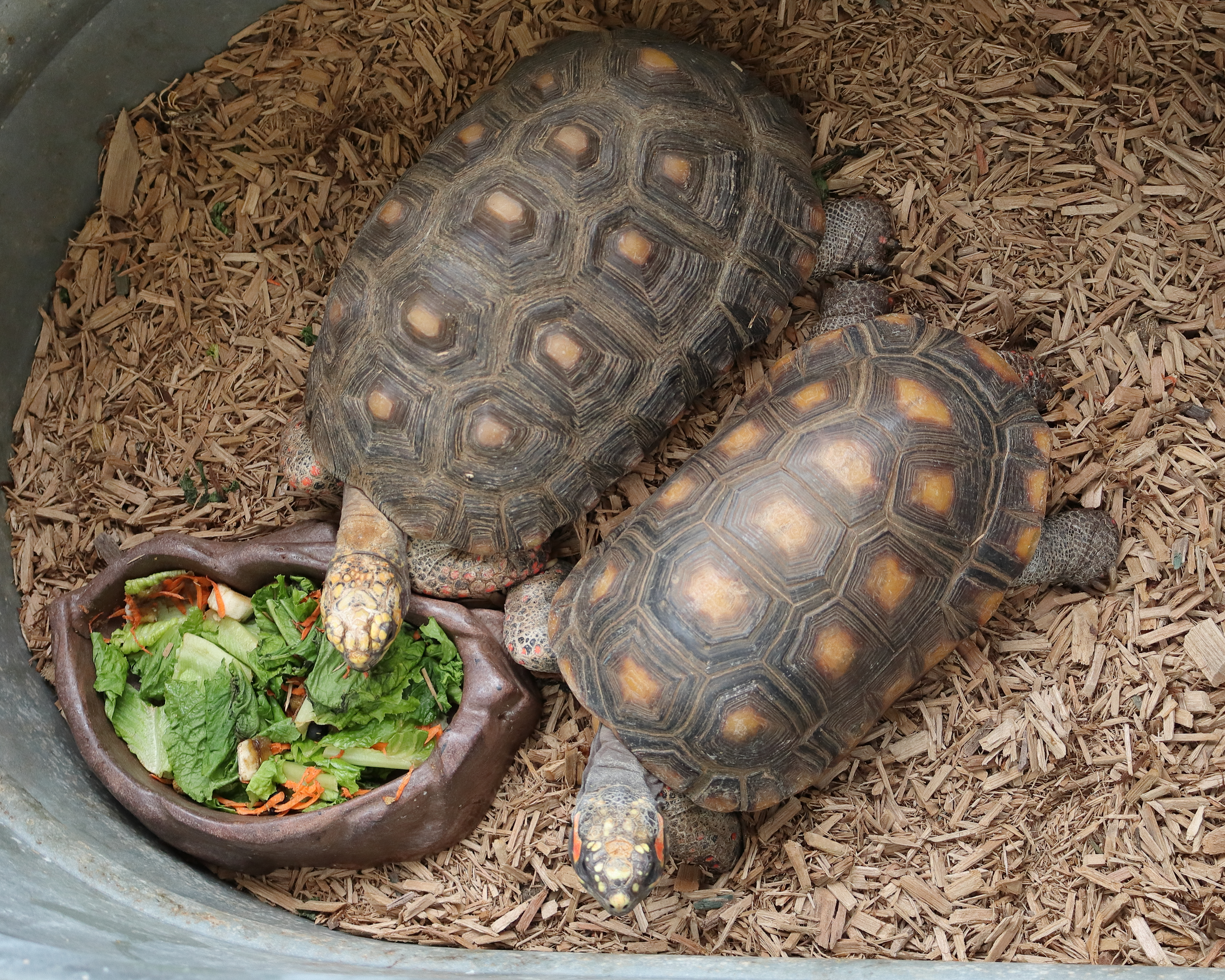
Sweet Pea & Jerry, red-footed tortoises

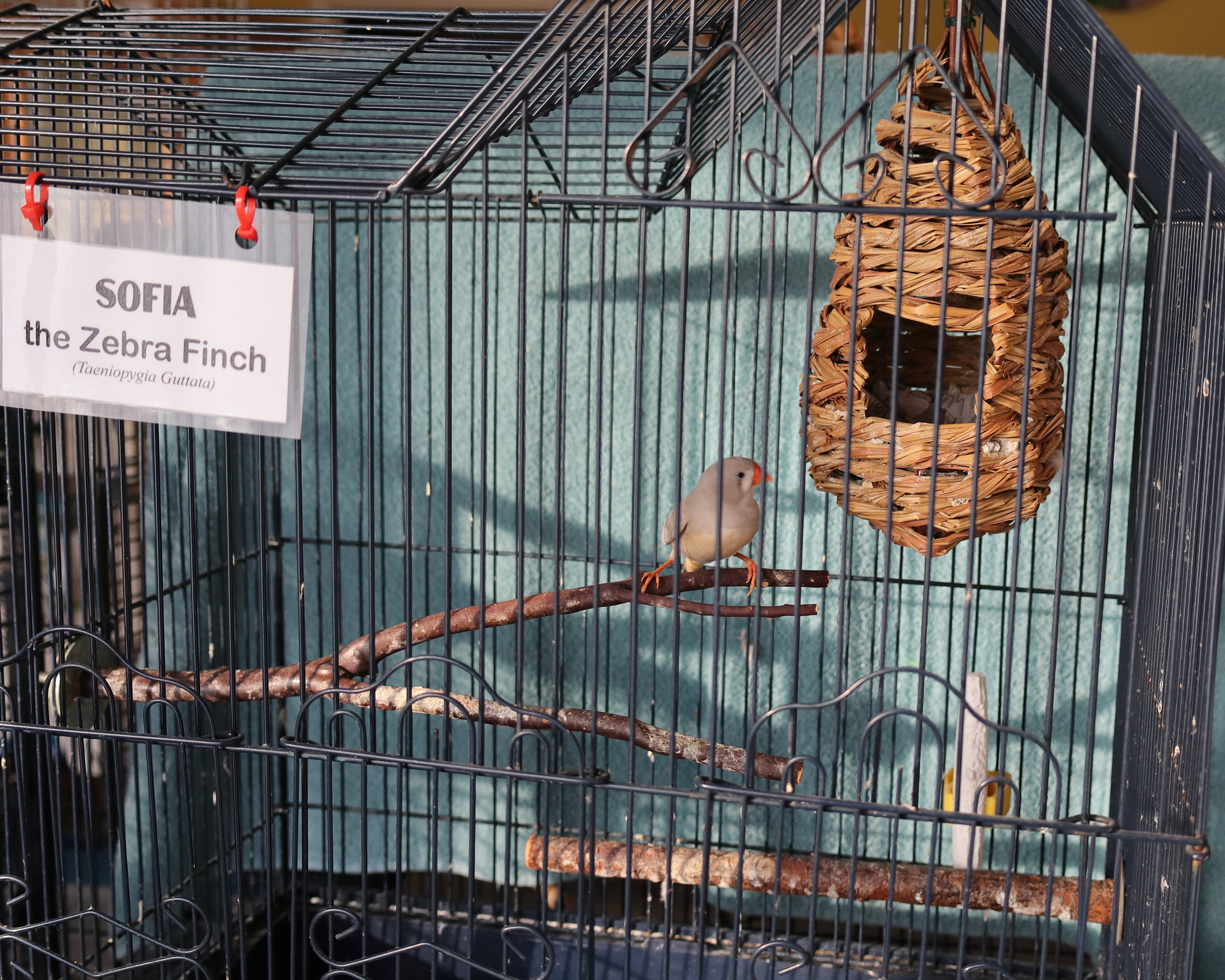
Sofia the Zebra Finch

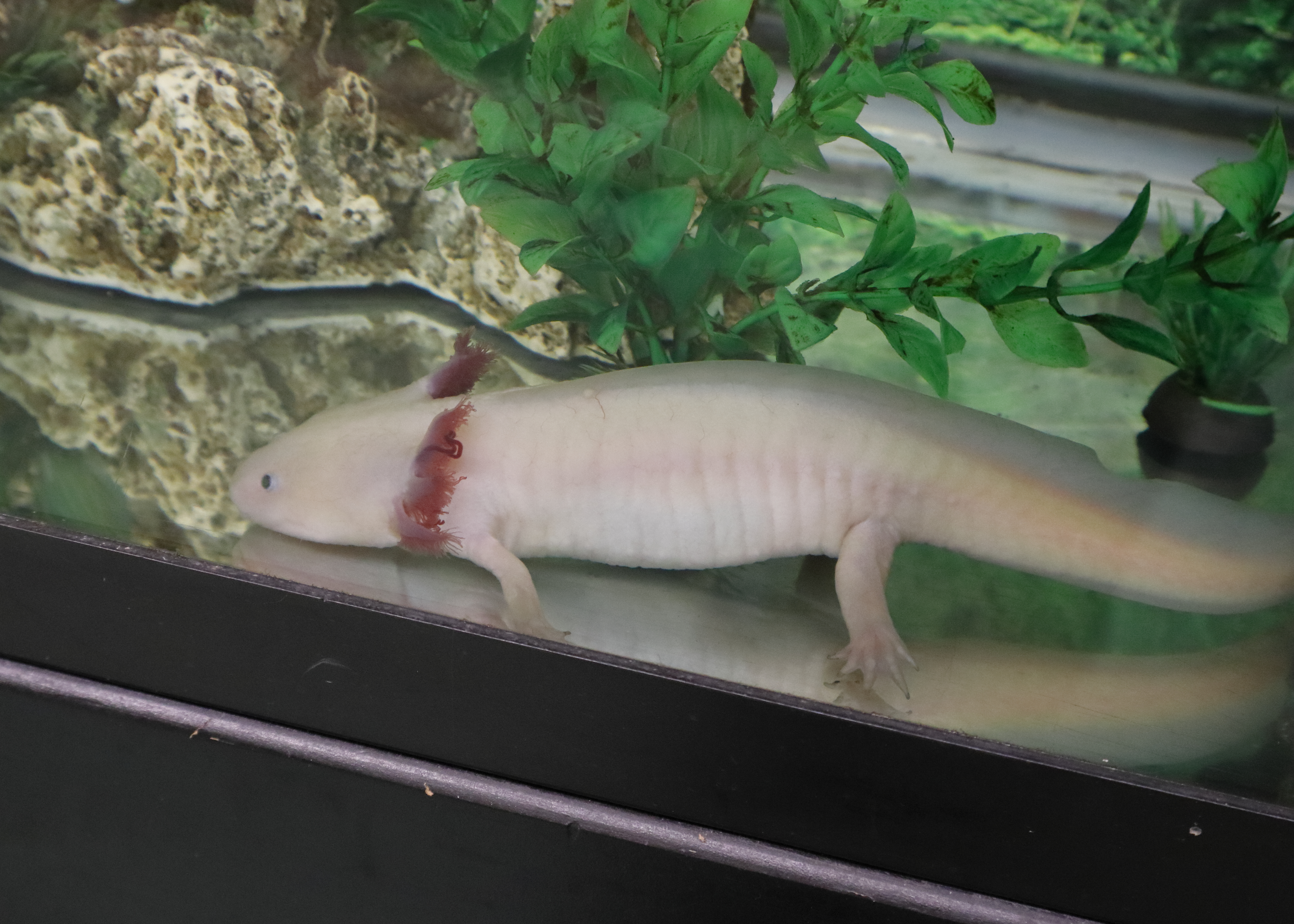
Ansel the Axolotl

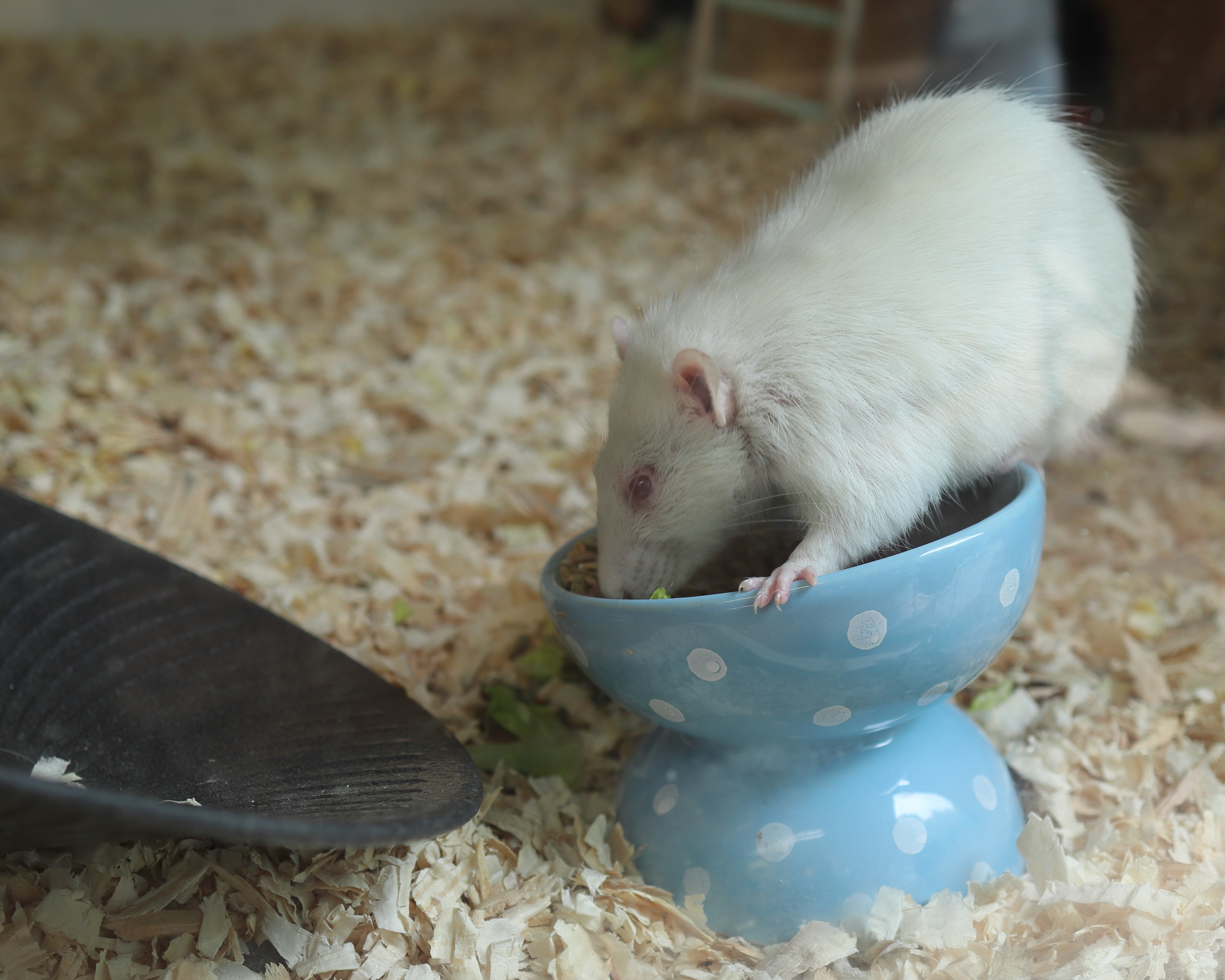
George, domesticated rat

== Events ==
Capen Hill runs day camps in the summer for ages 5–12, offering a program to help children connect with nature and enjoy the outdoors. They also hold an annual fall festival and Easter egg decorating events.
