= Charlton Public Library =

Charlton Public Library may refer to:

- Charlton Public Library (Georgia)
- Charlton Public Library (Massachusetts)

== See also ==
- Charlton House Library in Charlton, London
- Charlton Kings Library in Charlton Kings, England
