= Rider Tavern =

- U.S. National Register of Historic Places
- U.S. Historic district – Contributing property
- Rider Tavern

- Location within Massachusetts Location within the United States
- Location: Stafford St. at Northside Rd., Charlton, Massachusetts
- Coordinates: 42°9′53″N 71°57′13″W
- Built: 1797
- Architect: Wheelock, Eli
- Architectural style: Federal
- Part of: Northside Village Historic District (ID77000195)
- NRHP reference No.: 76000292

Significant dates
- Added to NRHP: May 19, 1976
- Designated CP: October 5, 1977

The Rider Tavern (also Rider's Hotel or Old North Charlton Inn) is a historic tavern on Stafford Street in the Northside Village Historic District of Charlton, Massachusetts, United States. The tavern, now a large three-story wood-frame building, was built in 1797, and was for many years an important stop on the stagecoach road. It is owned by the Charlton Historical Society, and open for guided tours in the summer and special events.

The building was listed on the National Register of Historic Places in 1976, and included in the Northside Village Historic District in 1977.

== Construction ==
Eli Wheelock began work on the building now known as the Rider Tavern in early 1797. He wanted this new inn to be an exceptional stop on the way between Worcester and Hartford, and also a place for him to sell the liquor that his distillery produced. All the materials used in the construction came from within six miles (10 km) of Charlton's Northside Village, with the exception of the ingredients for paint which came from Worcester. During the construction process, on September 18, 1797, Wheelock died, possibly from falling off the building's third-story roof. A local businessman, Leonard Morey, who Wheelock was partnering with, was named executor of Wheelock's estate and oversaw the completion of the tavern's construction. It was finished in October 1799.

The main carpenter of the building was John A. Haven. Many of the designs were taken from architectural books such as those of Batty Langley. The building was quite large for the time period: 90 feet (27 m) long, 40 feet (12 m) wide, and three stories tall. The roof was initially relatively flat, with only one foot (30 cm) difference in height between the center and the edges. During the 19th century, the building had the only roof garden in New England other than those in Boston.

== Architecture and interior ==
Donald Weinhardt, president of the Charlton Historical Society in 2000, commented at that time that he appreciated the building's unique architecture, saying, "It's an almost three-story structure that doesn't really look like a public building, or a tavern or an inn. It is really a unique building."

Rooms in the building include nine bedrooms, a ballroom taking up most of the second floor, a greeting room, a doctor's room, and a barroom.

== Use as a tavern ==
Photograph of the inn in 1913

After Wheelock's death, the building was divided into the eastern third which was inherited by Wheelock's widow in 1800, and the western two-thirds which was sold at auction in 1801. The purchasers of the western two-thirds were brothers Isaiah and William Rider, who also acquired Wheelock's distillery. It became a major stop for travelers on the stagecoach road. The Rider brothers operated the tavern until 1823 when Isaiah Rider died. In 1824, Nathaniel Wilson, Jr. from Spencer purchased the tavern and renamed it Wilson's Coffee House.

== Visit of General Marquis de Lafayette ==
Marquis de Lafayette visited the tavern on September 3, 1824, as part of his tour of the United States. He had a large contingent of people with him, including fifty horsemen. The tavern hosted a celebration in his honor, and he reviewed the local militia troops in the lot across the street. A small dining room in the tavern is still called the "Lafayette Dining Room".

== Other uses ==
Throughout the years, the building has been used for many things, including as an auction house and dance hall. It has also hosted Freemasonry meetings and served as the setting for films. Apartments in the building have been rented out for most of its existence.

== Historic preservation ==
The Charlton Historical Society purchased the building in 1976 and have been working to restore it. They received a $110,000 state grant in August 2014 to perform a renovation project that included replacing the siding with red cedar clapboard and repairing seven doors, 65 windows, and three portions of the roof. It was also painted gray instead of yellow, as they believe that was closer to the original color that travelers would have seen. As of 2020, they had restored 17 of the tavern's rooms, as well as the hallways. They have also been working to bring attention to the tavern's history and have run reenactments of Lafayette's visit.

The building serves as the Society's headquarters, and they use it to store historical archives about many buildings and families, including 17 cabinets of photographs, documents, and other artifacts. Some of the documents stored include 19th century town reports, historic maps, church records, and ledgers from early town businesses.

== See also ==
- National Register of Historic Places listings in Worcester County, Massachusetts
