= District No. 2 Schoolhouse (Charlton, Massachusetts) =

Historic building in Massachusetts, US

- District No. 2 Schoolhouse (Northside School)
- U.S. Historic district – Contributing property
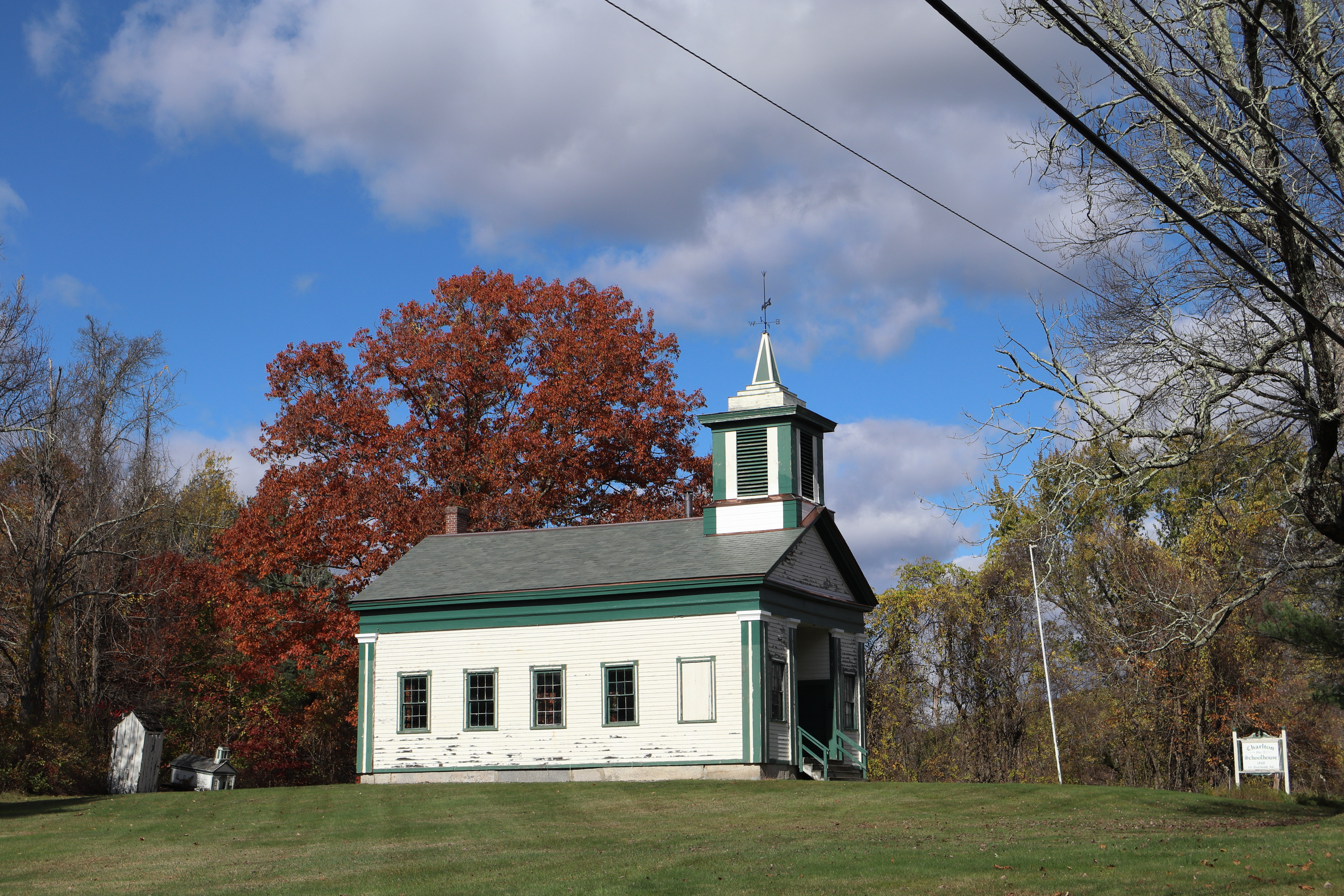
- The schoolhouse in October 2025
- Location: 145 Northside Road; Charlton, Massachusetts
- Coordinates: 42.1627°N 71.9541°W
- Built: 1848
- Architectural style: Greek revival
- Part of: Northside Village Historic District (ID77000195)

The District No. 2 Schoolhouse, also known as the Northside School, is a historic one-room schoolhouse in the Northside Village Historic District in Charlton, Massachusetts, United States. It was built in 1848, and was in use as a school until 1949.

== Construction ==
The No. 2 Schoolhouse was built starting in 1848, on the foundation that was left from the former Baptist Meetinghouse. It was built in a style typical for schoolhouses of the time, using Greek Revival architecture, having a rectangular bell tower, and is almost 1,000 square feet (93 m^{2}) in size.

== Bell ==
The bell in the schoolhouse's tower weighs 2,080 pounds (940 kg) and was cast in London in 1719 from the same mold as the Liberty Bell. The bell was in the Old North Church for 57 years before being moved to Charlton in 1802. It was given by Revolutionary War captain Jesse Smith to the Baptist Meetinghouse and recast in 1845 for use on the schoolhouse. The bell was taken down in October 1989, restored, and reinstalled in May 1990. Former student and Charlton resident Bruce H. Lamprey said in 1993 that the bell had "a perfect B tone."

== School use ==
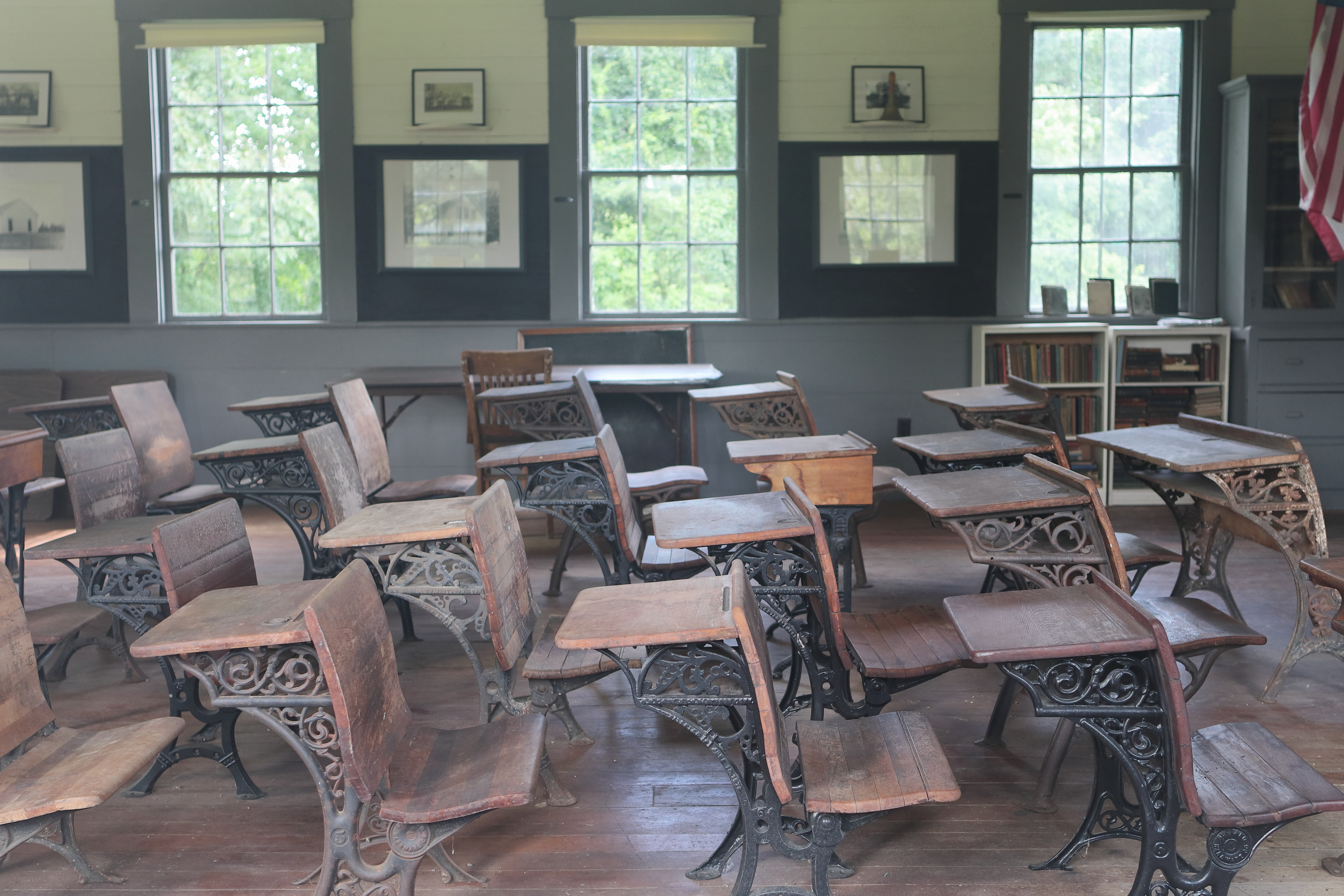
Many of the original desks remain inside the schoolhouse

The school had a capacity of around 40 students. Initially it served to educate students of all ages. As high schools became established, it began to serve grades one through eight exclusively. By the time it stopped being used as a school it was designated to only be for grades four through six.

The school closed in 1949.

== Later use ==
The American Legion used the building for some time, but for much of the time since it closed as a school it hasn't been regularly occupied, though it has sometimes been used for storage. Some activities would take place there, such as meetings of the Charlton Cultural Council.

== Restoration and maintenance efforts ==
Reproduction outhouse behind school

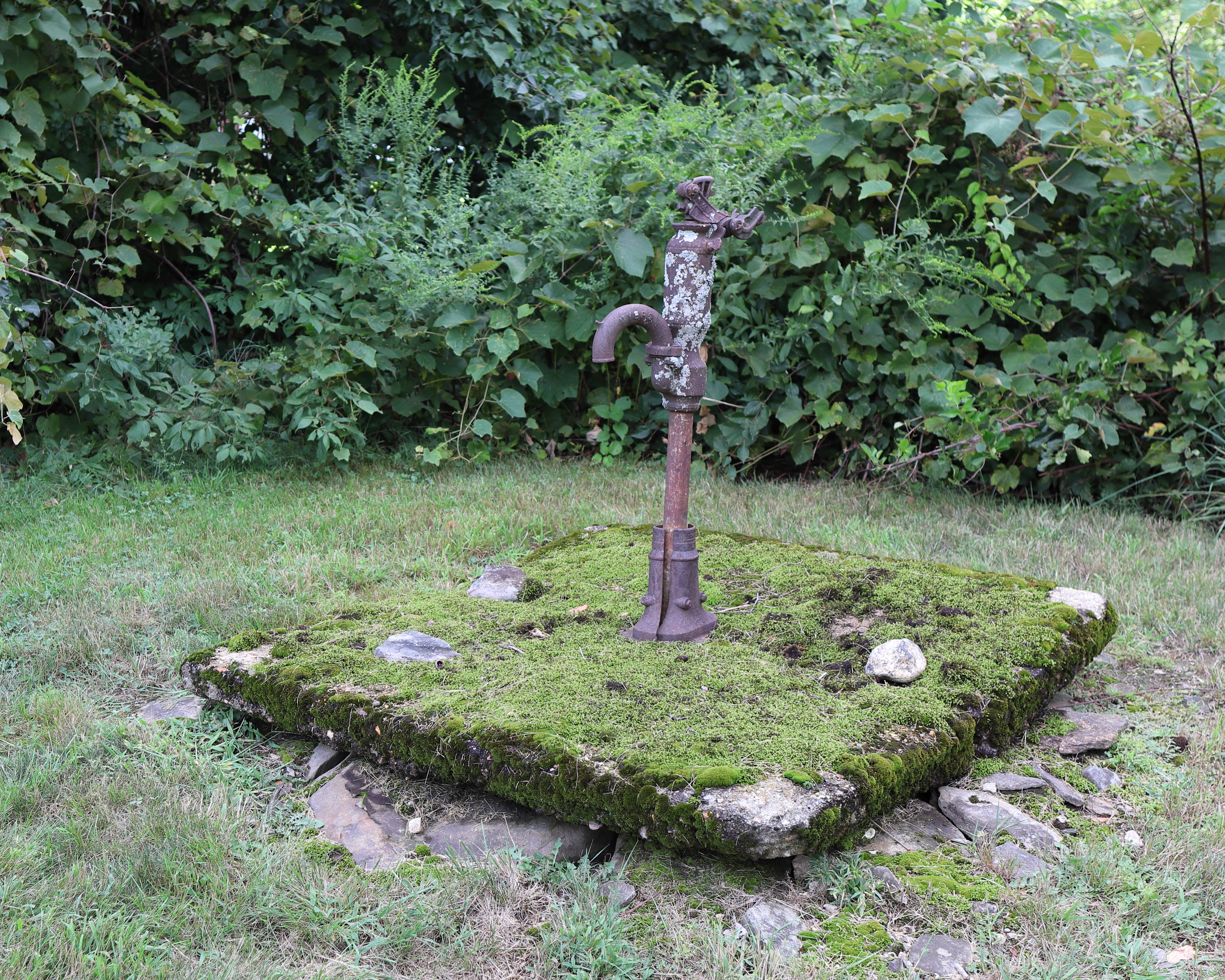
Pitcher pump and well in yard

A group named Friends of the No. 2 Schoolhouse was formed in 1989 to raise money, repair, and maintain the schoolhouse. By 1994, that round of renovations was completed using a combination of state grants, town funds, and private donations.

However, by 2009 the schoolhouse was once again showing signs of age and the group didn't have the funding to continue maintaining it. As the building was still in fact town property, the Friends of the No. 2 Schoolhouse along with the Charlton Historical Society approached the town, asking it to fund continued repairs and maintenance, with the Charlton Historical Society working to help care for the building.

In 2021, additional efforts began to renovate and address structural issues, including applying for and receiving a $50,000 grant in 2023 from the Massachusetts Historical Society. The total project cost was estimated to be around $300,000, and included a replacement roof and other exterior repair work. The work was underway in 2025.

In 2024, Charlton Town Administrator Andrew Golas said about the importance of maintaining the building, "The No. 2 Schoolhouse is the only remaining publicly accessible, one-room schoolhouse in the town of Charlton, and one of few remaining in the Commonwealth."
