= John Spurr House =

Historic house in Massachusetts, United States

- U.S. National Register of Historic Places
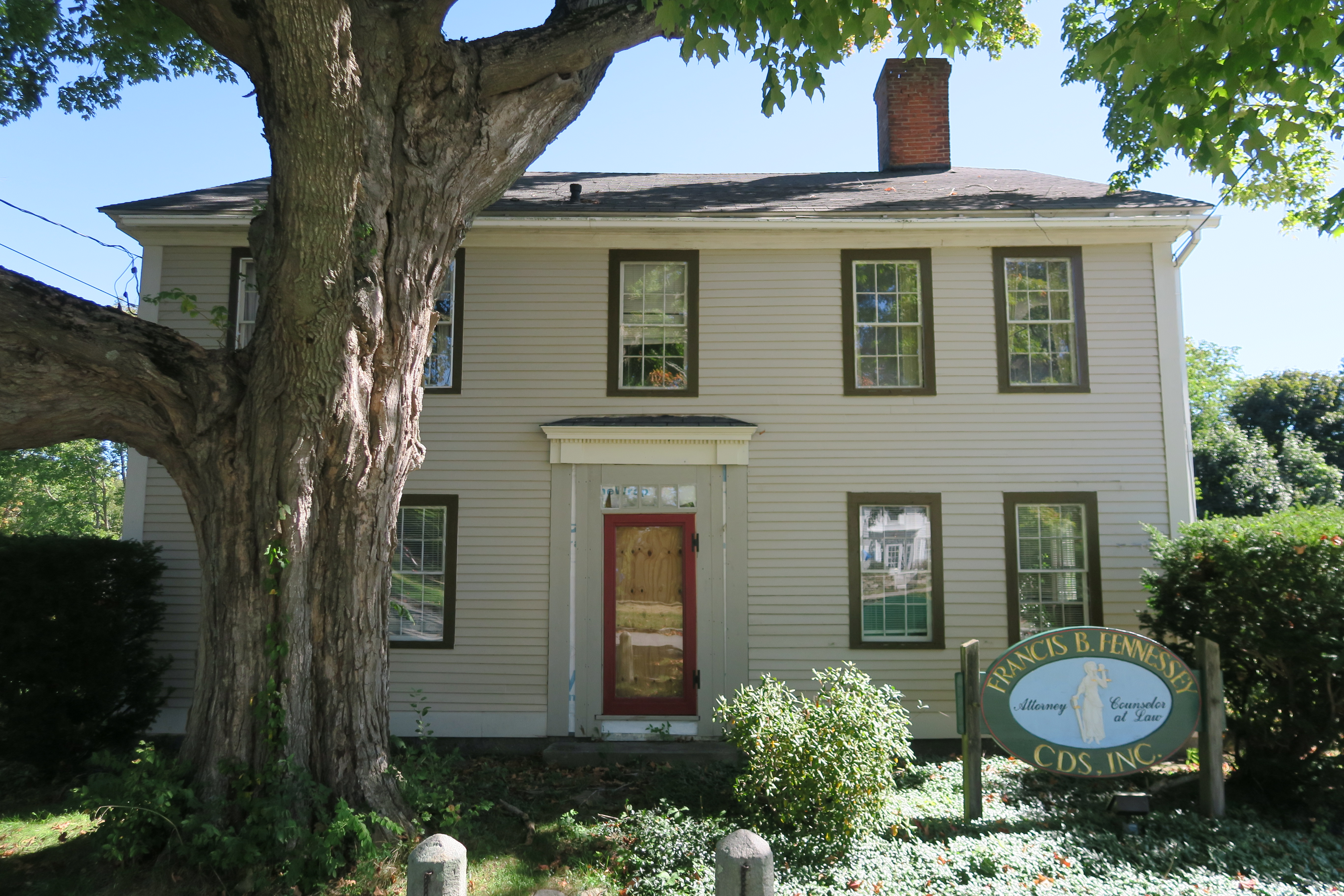
- John Spurr House

- Location within Massachusetts Location within the United States
- Location: Charlton, Massachusetts
- Coordinates: 42°8′6″N 71°58′10″W
- Built: 1798
- NRHP reference No.: 76000293
- Added to NRHP: April 26, 1976

The John Spurr House is an historic house on Main Street in Charlton, Massachusetts. The house was built in 1798 and added to the National Historic Register in 1976.

Maj. Gen. John Spurr (1759–1816) served in the Continental Army during the Revolutionary War. He participated in both the Boston Tea Party and the Battle of Bunker Hill. He was commissioned a captain in Col. Thomas Nixon's Regiment in 1777. He fought in the second Battle of Saratoga, Sep-Oct 1777, and was present during the surrender of General John Burgoyne. He was promoted to the rank of major in 1780. He eventually held the rank of major general in the Massachusetts State Militia.

John Spurr's granddaughter, Mary Louisa Spurr, was the first wife of Sen. George Frisbie Hoar, and the mother of Congressman Rockwood Hoar.

== See also ==
- National Register of Historic Places listings in Worcester County, Massachusetts
