= Bay Path Regional Vocational Technical High School =

Coordinates: 42°8′2″N 71°57′27″W

- 57 Old Muggett Hill; Charlton, Massachusetts 01507; United States

Information
- Type: Public
- Established: 1972
- School district: Southern Worcester County Regional Vocational Technical District
- Superintendent: Kyle Brenner
- Principal: Dean Packard
- Faculty: 115.02 (on FTE basis)
- Enrollment: 1,188 (2024-2025)
- Student to teacher ratio: 10.37
- Colors: Purple and Gold
- Athletics conference: Central Massachusetts Athletic Conference
- Mascot: Minutemen
- Newspaper: The Mugget Hiller
- Budget: $20,869,057 total $18,812 per pupil (2016)
- Communities served: Auburn, Charlton, Dudley, North Brookfield, Oxford, Paxton, Rutland, Spencer, Southbridge, Webster
- Website: www.baypath.net

Bay Path Regional Vocational Technical High School is a secondary school located in Charlton, Massachusetts, United States and sits on top of Old Mugget Hill. The school serves a total of about 1,100 students within grades 9 to 12 and some Post-Grad students as well.

== General ==
Bay Path was established in 1967, but first opened in 1972. Its students come from the surrounding towns of Auburn, Charlton, Dudley, N. Brookfield, Oxford, Paxton, Rutland, Spencer, Southbridge, and Webster.

Bay Path is a vocational school with 24 different shops for students to choose from: Advanced Manufacturing; Auto Collision, Repair and Refinishing; Automotive Technology; Business Technology; Cabinetry; Carpentry; Cosmetology; Culinary Arts, Dental Assisting; Drafting; Diesel Technology; Electrical; Electronics; Facilities Management; Graphic Communications; Health Technologies; Heating, Ventilation, Air conditioning, Refrigeration; Information Support Services and Networking; Marketing; Masonry and Tile Setting; Metal Fabrication and Joining Technologies, Plumbing; Programming and Web Development; Veterinary Science.

Bay Path has an evening school program simply named Bay Path Adult Evening School which is in session for two semesters (fall and spring) with over 175 courses, shows, and tours to choose from.

== Groups ==
Bay Path's students can also join many different school groups. These include Renaissance, National Honor Society, Year Book Committee, Student Council, S.A.D.D (Students Against Destructive Decisions), Skills USA, Robotics, Math Team, Gay Straight Alliance (GSA), Ski Club, Student Government Day, Bowling club, Cornhole club, Board Game club, Chorus and Drama/Theatre club.

== Achievements ==
Aside from the numerous sports titles, like the 2008,2011,2023,2024 and 2025 State Vocational Football Championship, Bay Path also has been noted for its academic achievements, including:

- 2007 Compass School die for its remarkable MCAS scores over the past years.
- Bay Path's Culinary Department has also won the Southern Worcester, Massachusetts chowder fest.
- Bay Path has placed many students in Skills USA and many have won Gold, Silver, and Bronze in states and in National.

== Notable alumni ==
- Kenneth Doane - professional wrestler known for his time in WWE
