= Northside Village Historic District =

Historic district in Massachusetts, United States

- U.S. National Register of Historic Places
- U.S. Historic district
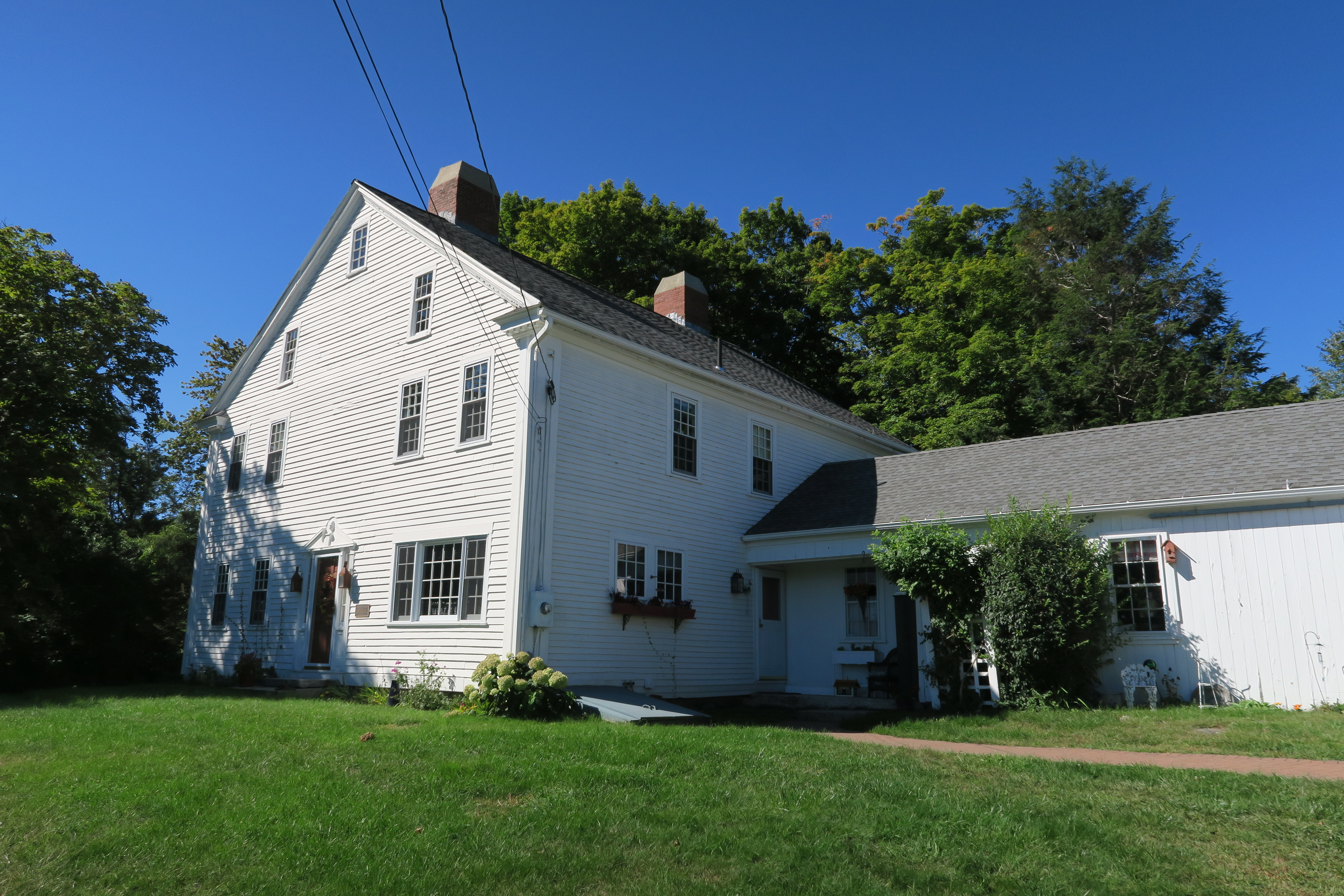
- Waters-Morton House

- Location within Massachusetts Location within the United States
- Location: Stafford Street, Northside and Cemetery Roads, Charlton, Massachusetts
- Coordinates: 42°9′53″N 71°57′24″W
- Area: 70 acres (28 ha)
- Built: 1735
- Architectural style: Greek Revival
- NRHP reference No.: 77000195
- Added to NRHP: October 5, 1977

The Northside Village Historic District encompasses a rural village center on Stafford Road in northern Charlton, Massachusetts. Located at the junction of Stafford Road with Northside and Cemetery Roads is a small cluster of residential buildings, developed beginning in 1735 around a small tanning business, and later as a stagecoach stop. The district was listed on the National Register of Historic Places in 1977.

== Description and history ==
Charlton was settled in 1735 as part of Oxford, and was separately incorporated in 1775. One of its first settlers was Jonothan Wheelock, whose house built that year still stands near the eastern end of the district. Wheelock established a tannery and distillery on a nearby brook, of which only archaeological remnants survive on their sites. In 1796 his house was purchased by John Haven, who is credited with building a number of the surviving buildings in the village. The Rider Tavern, built in 1797, became a stop on the stagecoach route between Worcester and Hartford, Connecticut, including among its visitors the Marquis de Lafayette. The tavern is now a museum operated by the local historical society.

The historic district is centered on the two junctions of Stafford Road, the historic stage route, with Northside Road, extending south to the town center, and Cemetery Road, running north. There are thirteen buildings in the district, most of which were built before 1850. In addition to the Rider Tavern and Wheelock House, notable buildings include the Waters-Morton House, which was home both to a prominent local politician, and was the childhood home of Dr. William T. G. Morton, a dentist who introduced the use of ether as an anesthetic. The only non-residential building in the district is the 1848 No. 2 Schoolhouse.

== See also ==
- National Register of Historic Places listings in Worcester County, Massachusetts
