= Charlton Public Library (Massachusetts) =

Library in Charlton, Massachusetts, US

- 42°08′02″N 71°58′13″W
- Location: Charlton, Massachusetts, United States
- Established: 1882

Access and use
- Circulation: 124,957 (2025)
- Members: 4,973 card holders (2025)

Other information
- Director: Betsy Perry
- Affiliation: CW MARS
- Website: charltonlibrary.org

The Charlton Public Library is a public library in Charlton, Massachusetts, United States. It was formed from the merger of two private library associations and has been a free library operated by the town since 1882. It has been located in Dexter Memorial Hall since that building's construction in 1905, and began occupying the complete building after a major renovation in 2007.

== History ==
In 1816, a private association was created in Charlton, Massachusetts called the Female Social Library. There was a one-dollar subscription fee for the women to be able to use it, with books housed at one of the members' homes. In 1860, another library was founded in town called the Charlton Young Men's Library Association or Charlton Agricultural Library Association, which also charged fees for use. The two libraries voted to join forces in 1882 and merge into a single free public library operated by the government of the town. One person voting in favor wrote, "I like very much the idea of a good library free to all citizens of the town and the Young Men’s Library would I think reach a larger number under the proposed plan than the present."

William H. Dexter, a native of the town, donated a building for use as a town hall and library. At its dedication on February 21, 1905, he said:

At first, I thought only of erecting a Library building, but the need of a town hall, and a suitable place for the town officers, seemed to be fully as great, and to accommodate all the people who came to the annual reunion in September, for all these purposes, this building, with its spacious hall, its library, and rooms for the town officers, as well as a commodious dining room, is erected.

The library would remain in that single room in the town hall, 1,100 square feet (100 m^{2}) in size, through 1998. On September 28, 1998, at a special town meeting, the voters of the town chose to transfer control of the entire building over to the library trustees and to begin raising money to perform renovations.

After a significant fundraising campaign that included over $1 million in community contributions in addition to state grant money from the Massachusetts Board of Library Commissioners, a groundbreaking ceremony for the building renovation project took place on December 3, 2005. During the renovation project, much of the collection was placed in storage, though about a third of it was moved to a temporary location at 61 North Main Street. There was a ceremonial "250 Hands Move 250 books" event on November 19, 2005, marking the move as well as marking the town's 250's anniversary. A couple years later, on July 23, 2007, the renovated building opened to the public, after a total project cost of $7.1 million. At the official ribbon-cutting ceremony on September 23, 2007, state senator Stephen Brewer said to the fundraising committee, "What a gift you have given to the town of Charlton."

== Services ==
The Charlton Public Library offers many programs and services to people in the community, including public computers, free Wi-Fi access, craft programs, and a summer reading program. They have a kids Lego Club, and operate a library of things for patrons to borrow useful household items. Several meeting and study rooms are also available.

== Banning of Eve's Diary ==
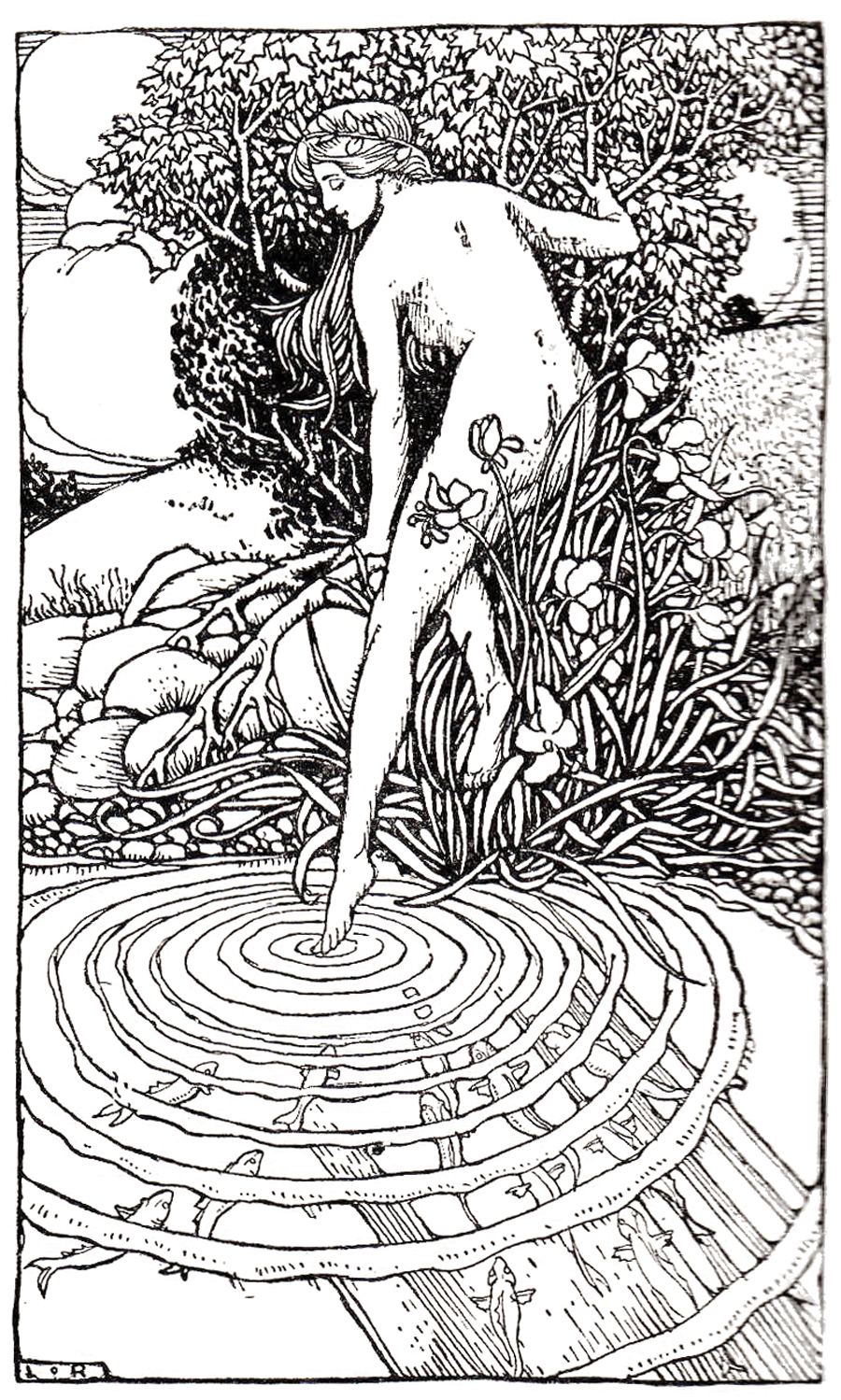
Controversial illustration, page 42 of Eve's Diary

In 1906, while looking through one hundred books that had been recently purchased for use in the library, librarian Hattie L. Carpenter saw the illustrations in Mark Twain's short story Eve's Diary and brought them to the attention of library trustee Frank O. Wakefield saying that she "had her doubts" about them.

Fifty of the pictures included Eve in "Summer costume" (meaning without clothes). The other trustees, Rev. George O. Jenness and Lewis A. McIntyre, agreed with Wakefield on banning the book from being shelved in the library. When asked by The New York Times for comment, Twain replied that "the action of the Charlton library was not of the slightest interest to him."

In December 1906, after Mark Twain testified at a hearing on updating laws relating to copyright, he was asked again for his opinion on the banning of the book. He replied:

The whole episode has rather amused me. I have no feeling of vindictiveness over the stand of the libraries there—I am only amused. You see they did not object to my book; they objected to Lester Ralph's pictures. I wrote the book; I did not make the pictures. I admire the pictures, and I heartily approve them, but I did not make them.

It seems curious to me—some of the incidents in this case. It appears that the pictures in "Eve's Diary" were first discovered by a lady librarian. When she made the dreadful find, being very careful, she jumped at no hasty conclusions—not she—she examined the horrid things in detail. It took her some time to examine them all, but she did her hateful duty! I don't blame her for this careful examination; the time she spent was, I am sure, enjoyable, for I found considerable fascination in them myself.

Then she took the book to another librarian, a male this time, and he, also, took a long time to examine the unclothed ladies. He must have found something of the same sort of fascination in them that I found. Now, if the pictures were so good as to occupy their attention so long, it seems to me that they were a little selfish not to permit the rest of the city a chance instead of shutting the volume out.

Seriously, the pictures in the book are graceful and beautiful; they show fine and delicate feeling. So far from being immodest, I thought them chaste and in good taste. To the library that barred them it would, no doubt, have been satisfactory had the ladies in Eden been garbed with a fig-leaf each, but to my mind that sort of thing is only advertising immodesty.

The next year in a letter to a Mrs. Whitmore in Hartford, Twain wrote:

But the truth is, that when a Library expels a book of mine and leaves an unexpurgated Bible lying around where unprotected youth and age can get a hold of it, the deep unconscious irony of it delights me and doesn't anger me.

=== Book unbanned ===
Over one hundred years later in 2008, Richard Whitehead became a library trustee and was doing research on its history when he discovered that the Charlton Public Library had banned the book. He worked to locate a copy of the version that had been banned so that it could be restored to circulation. In 2011 in what Whitehead described as a largely symbolic gesture, the library board of trustees voted unanimously to reverse its ban. The book was displayed prominently as part of a celebration of Banned Books Week.

The move attracted a significant amount of positive press, including an article in The New York Times to follow up on its initial 1906 reporting. The Times said that the illustrations "now seem quite chaste". Library director Cheryl Hansen was pleased with getting some favorable attention on the library, saying, "We're getting positive press for a change. We're usually talking about bad budgets, things like that." An editorial in The Record reported that "Within hours of two paperback copies of the book being shelved at the Charlton Library, one had been checked out," and called it "a fitting start" to Banned Books Week.

== Controversy over having police ask for return of overdue items ==
The Charlton library got some negative press after having a town police officer visit a home on December 27, 2011, to inform the family there about some long-overdue items, including a book-on-tape audiobook that the library valued at $100. The library had sent several overdue notices and invoices but had not received a response. The library had thought that having a police officer just visit would be a more polite step rather than trying to pursue the issue in the courts, which would also have required an officer to deliver a summons to the family. However, the visit greatly upset the 5-year-old girl living there, who feared being arrested. Hansen said about the issue, "I think this is the friendlier, gentler way in my opinion. It's too bad that that is what it takes but it's worked; we've gotten materials back." An editorial in the Worcester Telegram & Gazette defended the library, saying "Our cherished library system is built on order and trust. Public libraries belong to the community, are paid for by residents, and deserve respect and cooperation."
