= Julian Ralph =

American journalist

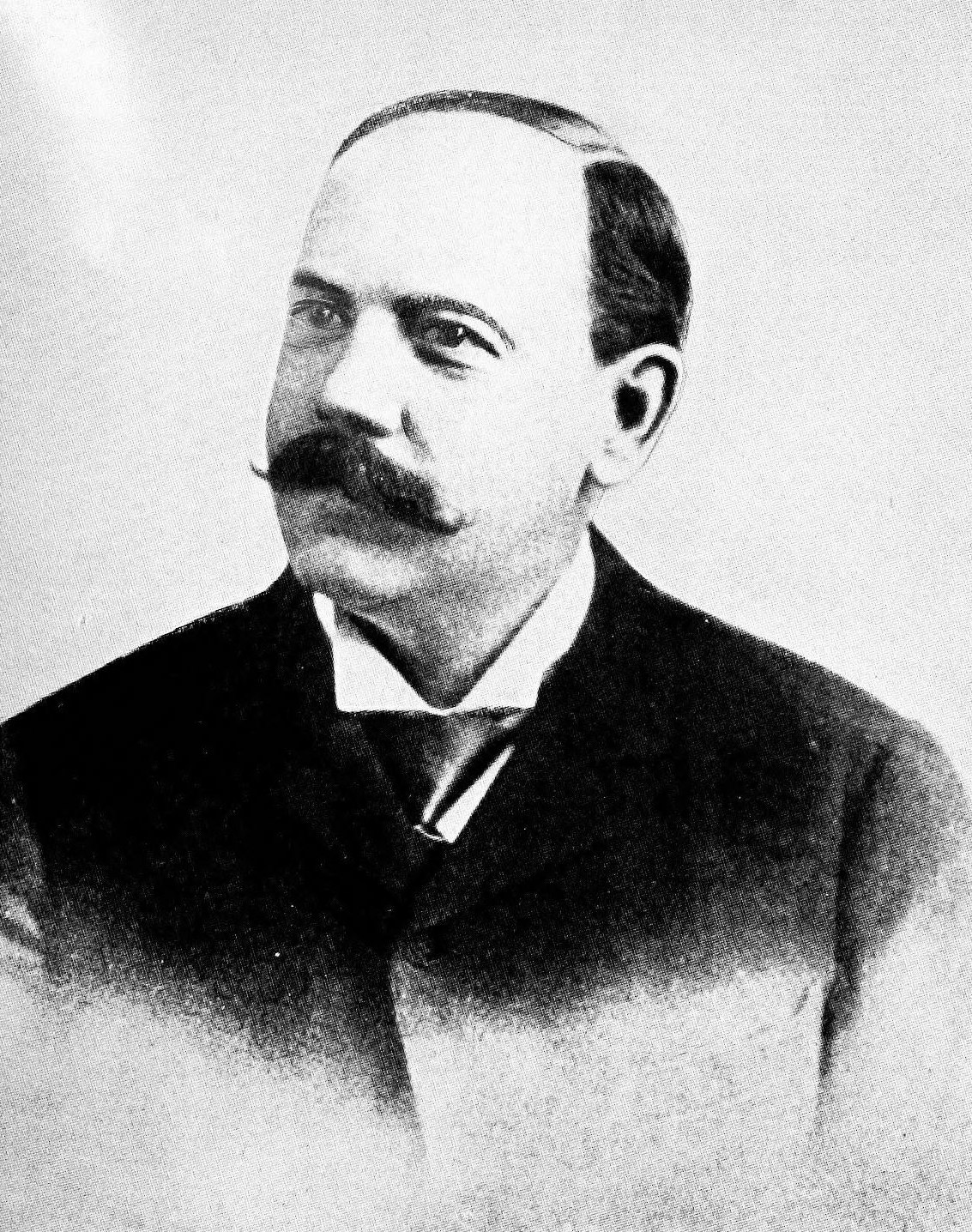
- Born: May 27, 1853; New York, New York
- Died: January 20, 1903 (aged 49); New York, New York
- Occupation: Journalist

Julian Ralph (May 27, 1853 – January 20, 1903) was an author and journalist, most noted for his work on The Sun, a newspaper of New York City.

== Biography ==
Julian Ralph was born in New York City on May 27, 1853. At 15 years of age he was a printer's apprentice in New Jersey for the Red Bank Standard where he later became a reporter. He became editor of the Webster, Massachusetts, Times. He returned to his hometown of New York City in 1872 where he was a reporter for The World. He joined the staff of the New York Daily Graphic in 1875, but within a year he left it and was on the staff of the New York Sun until 1895, gaining a world-wide reputation as a correspondent. In 1896 he became London correspondent for the New York Journal, was with the Turkish armies during the Greco-Turkish War in 1897, and in 1899 went to South Africa as war correspondent for the London Daily Mail. He was elected to the Royal Geographical Society in 1898.

In 1876 he married Isabella Mount.

He died at his home in New York City on January 20, 1903.

== Works ==
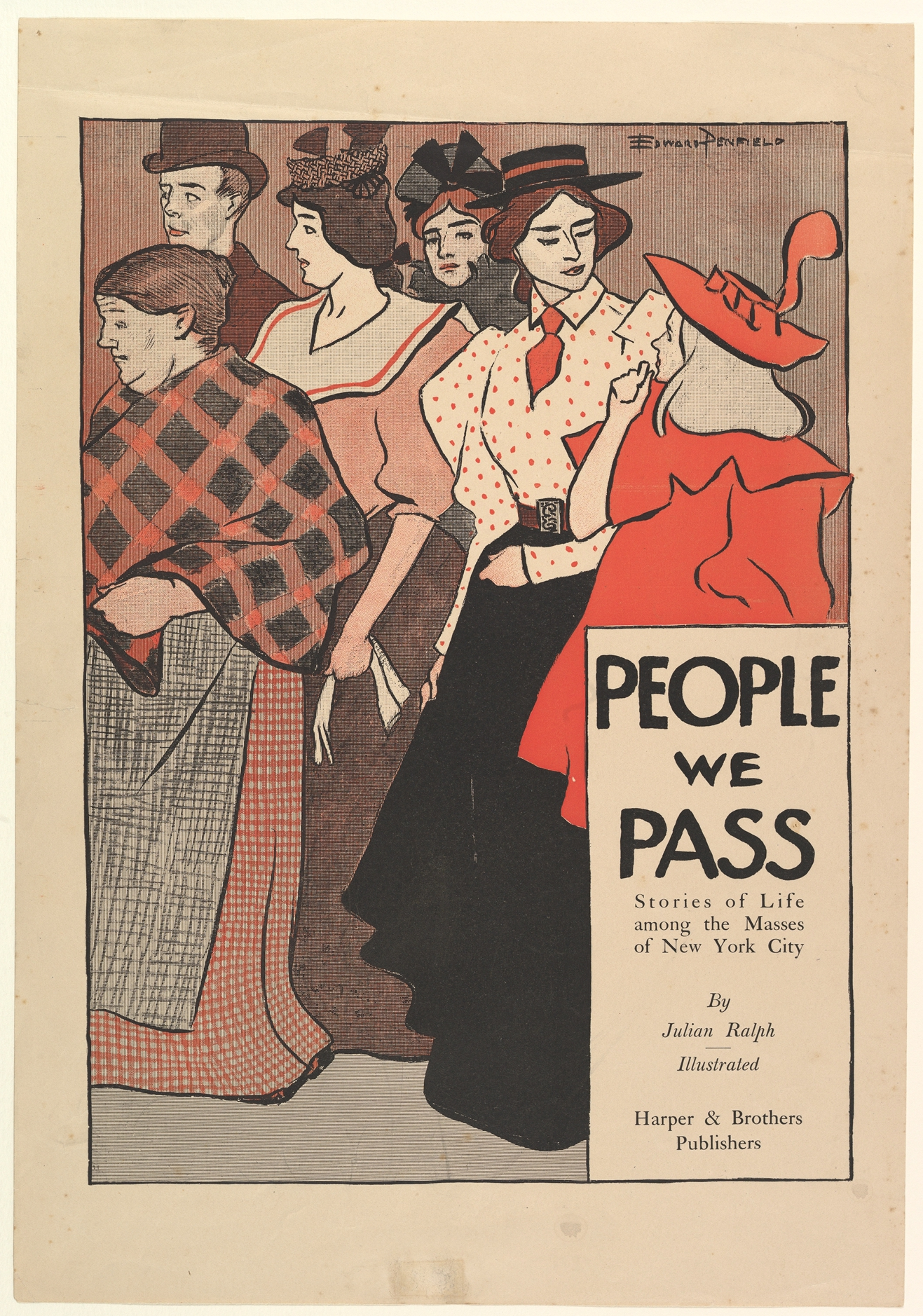
Edward Penfield poster for People We Pass (1896)

Besides numerous magazine articles, his publications include:

- The Sun's German Barber (1883)
- Dutchman or German (1889)
- On Canada's Frontier (1892)
- Chicago and the World's Fair (1893)
- Our Great West (1893)
- People We Pass (1895)
- Dixie (1896)
- Alone in China (1898)
- A Prince in Georgia (1899)
- Toward Pretoria (1900)
- An American with Lord Roberts (1901)
- War's Brighter Side (1901)
- The Millionairess (a novel, 1902)
- The Making of a Journalist (1903)
