= Charlton, Massachusetts =

- Town
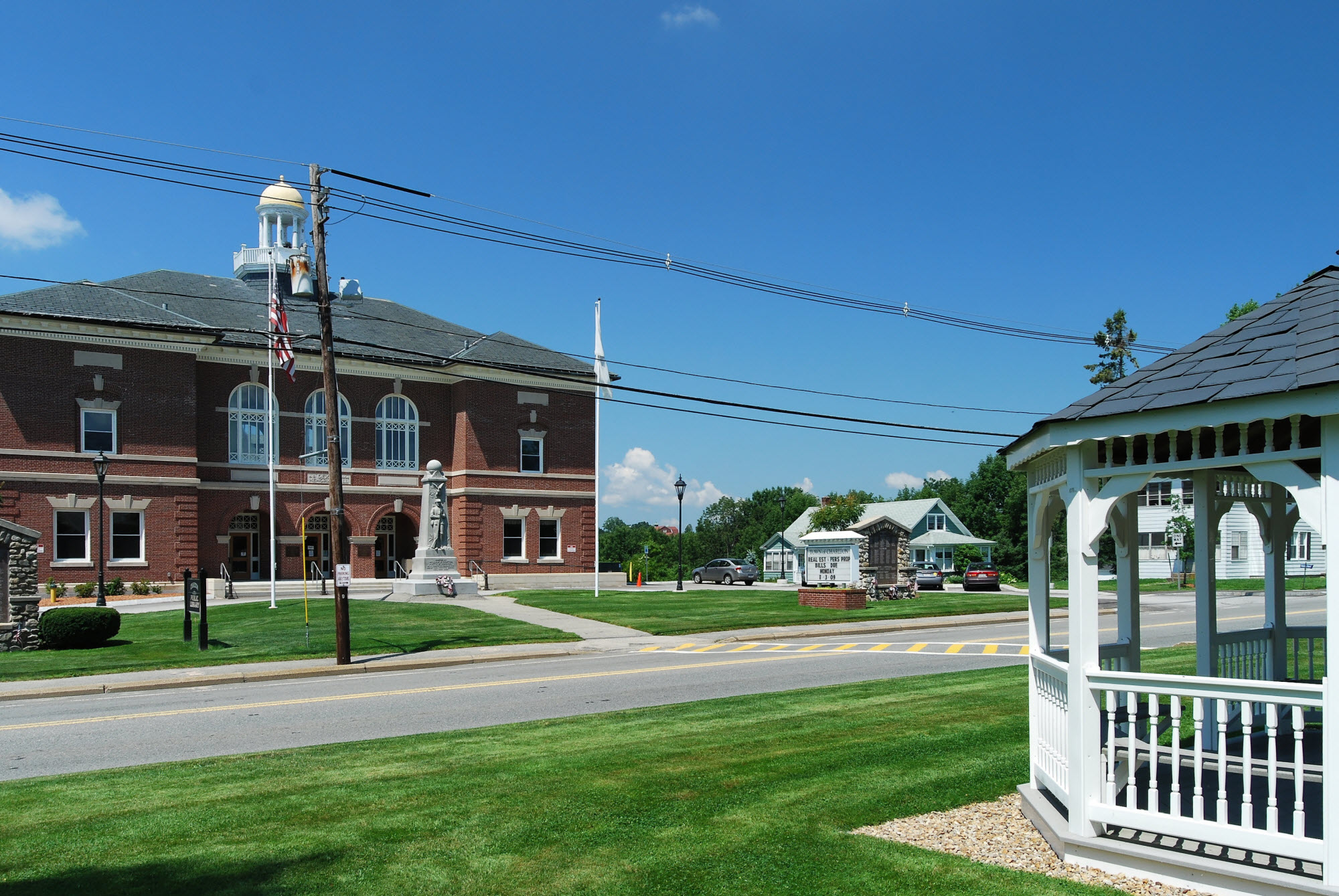
- Charlton Center

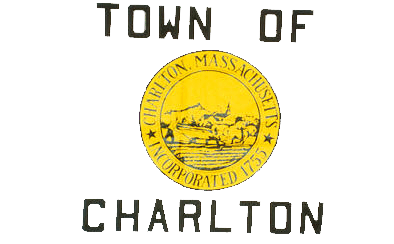
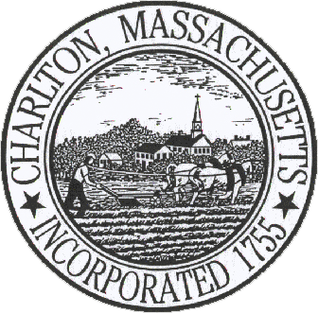
- Flag Seal

- Location in Worcester County and the state of Massachusetts.
- Coordinates: 42°08′08″N 71°58′14″W
- Country: United States
- State: Massachusetts
- County: Worcester
- Settled: 1735
- Incorporated: 1775

Government
  - Type: Open town meeting

Area
  - Total: 43.8 sq mi (113.4 km^{2})
  - Land: 42.5 sq mi (110.2 km^{2})
  - Water: 1.2 sq mi (3.2 km^{2})
- Elevation: 896 ft (273 m)

Population (2020)
  - Total: 13,315
  - Density: 312.9/sq mi (120.8/km^{2})
- Time zone: UTC−5 (Eastern)
  - Summer (DST): UTC−4 (Eastern)
- ZIP Codes: 01507 (Charlton); 01508 (Charlton City); 01509 (Charlton Depot)
- Area code: 508 / 774
- FIPS code: 25-12715
- GNIS feature ID: 0618359
- Website: www.townofcharlton.net

Charlton is a town in Worcester County, Massachusetts, United States. The population was 13,315 at the 2020 census.

== History ==
Charlton was first settled in 1735. It was established as a District separated from Oxford on January 10, 1755, and became a Town on August 23, 1775, by a law that made all Districts into Towns to help for the cause of the Revolutionary War. It was named after Sir Francis Charlton, 4th Baronet Charlton. During the 1800s, farming continued to be the major occupation, but woolen mills were being built along some of the town's brooks by the turn of the twentieth century.

== Geography ==
According to the United States Census Bureau, the town has a total area of 43.8 square miles (113 km^{2}), of which 42.5 square miles (110 km^{2}) is land and 1.2 square miles (3.1 km^{2}) (2.86%) is water.

== Demographics ==
Historical population
Year	Pop.	±%
1790	1,965	—
1850	2,015	+2.5%
1860	2,047	+1.6%
1870	1,878	−8.3%
1880	1,900	+1.2%
1890	1,847	−2.8%
1900	1,860	+0.7%
1910	2,032	+9.2%
1920	1,995	−1.8%
1930	2,154	+8.0%
1940	2,557	+18.7%
1950	3,136	+22.6%
1960	3,685	+17.5%
1970	4,654	+26.3%
1980	6,719	+44.4%
1990	9,576	+42.5%
2000	11,263	+17.6%
2010	12,981	+15.3%
2020	13,315	+2.6%
2022*	13,360	+0.3%
* = population estimate. Source: United States census records and Population Estimates Program data.

As of the census of 2020, there were 13,315 people and 5,007 households. The population density was 315.7 inhabitants per square mile (121.9/km^{2}). The racial makeup of the town was 91.0% White, 2.9% African American, 0.6% Asian, and 4.8% from two or more races. Hispanic or Latino of any race were 2.9% of the population.

There were 5,007 households, out of which 24.7% had children under the age of 18 living with them. 5.9% had children under the age of 5 years old living with them. 18% were individuals 65 years or older in the household.

According to the 2000 Census, in the town, the population was spread out, with 30.0% under the age of 18, 5.8% from 18 to 24, 34.4% from 25 to 44, 22.1% from 45 to 64, and 7.7% who were 65 years of age or older. The median age was 35 years. For every 100 females, there were 95.9 males. For every 100 females age 18 and over, there were 93.8 males.

The median income for a household in the town was $63,033, and the median income for a family was $70,208. Males had a median income of $46,727 versus $33,451 for females. The per capita income for the town was $23,626. About 4.9% of families and 5.6% of the population were below the poverty line, including 4.3% of those under age 18 and 10.7% of those age 65 or over.

== Arts and culture ==
=== Points of interest ===
- John Spurr House
- Rider Tavern
- Charlton Center Historic District
- Northside Village Historic District
- Buffumville Lake
- Capen Hill Nature Sanctuary
- Bay Path Regional Vocational Technical High School
- Tree House Brewing Company
- The residence of William T. G. Morton who first demonstrated ether as a surgical anaesthetic
- Grave of John "Grizzly" Adams
- Overlook retirement and senior living facility
- Charlton Arts and Activities Center
- Charlton Town Hall
- 508 International - Outdoor Motorsports Center

=== Library ===
Charlton Public Library

Charlton Public Library was established in 1882. In fiscal year 2008, the town of Charlton spent 1.73% ($306,971) of its budget on its public library—some $24 per person.

== Government ==
Charlton operates under an open town meeting form of government, with a five-member Board of Selectmen. Who are elected by voters for three-year terms every year. It is arranged so at least one or two members terms expires each year. Stephen Koronis is Chairman.

State government
State Representative(s):	John Marsi (R), Paul K. Frost (R)
State Senator(s):	Ryan Fattman (R)
Governor's Councilor(s):	Paul DePalo (D)
Federal government
U.S. Representative(s):	Richard E. Neal (D-1st District),
U.S. Senators:	Elizabeth Warren (D), Ed Markey (D)

== Education ==
Charlton public schools are part of the Dudley–Charlton Regional School district. Charlton Elementary serves students in kindergarten and first grade. The Heritage School serves students in grades 2 through 4. The Charlton Middle School serves grades 5 through 8. Charlton High Schoolers (ninth grade through twelfth grade) attend Shepherd Hill Regional High School in Dudley.

Charlton is also home to Bay Path Regional Vocational Technical High School which serves Charlton and surrounding communities.

There used to be a high school in the center of town called Charlton High School. That building is now used for the Charlton Municipal Offices.

== Infrastructure ==
Highways include:

- Route 31
- Route 169
- Route 20
- Massachusetts Turnpike (Interstate 90)
