= William Howe (architect) =

American architect and bridge builder

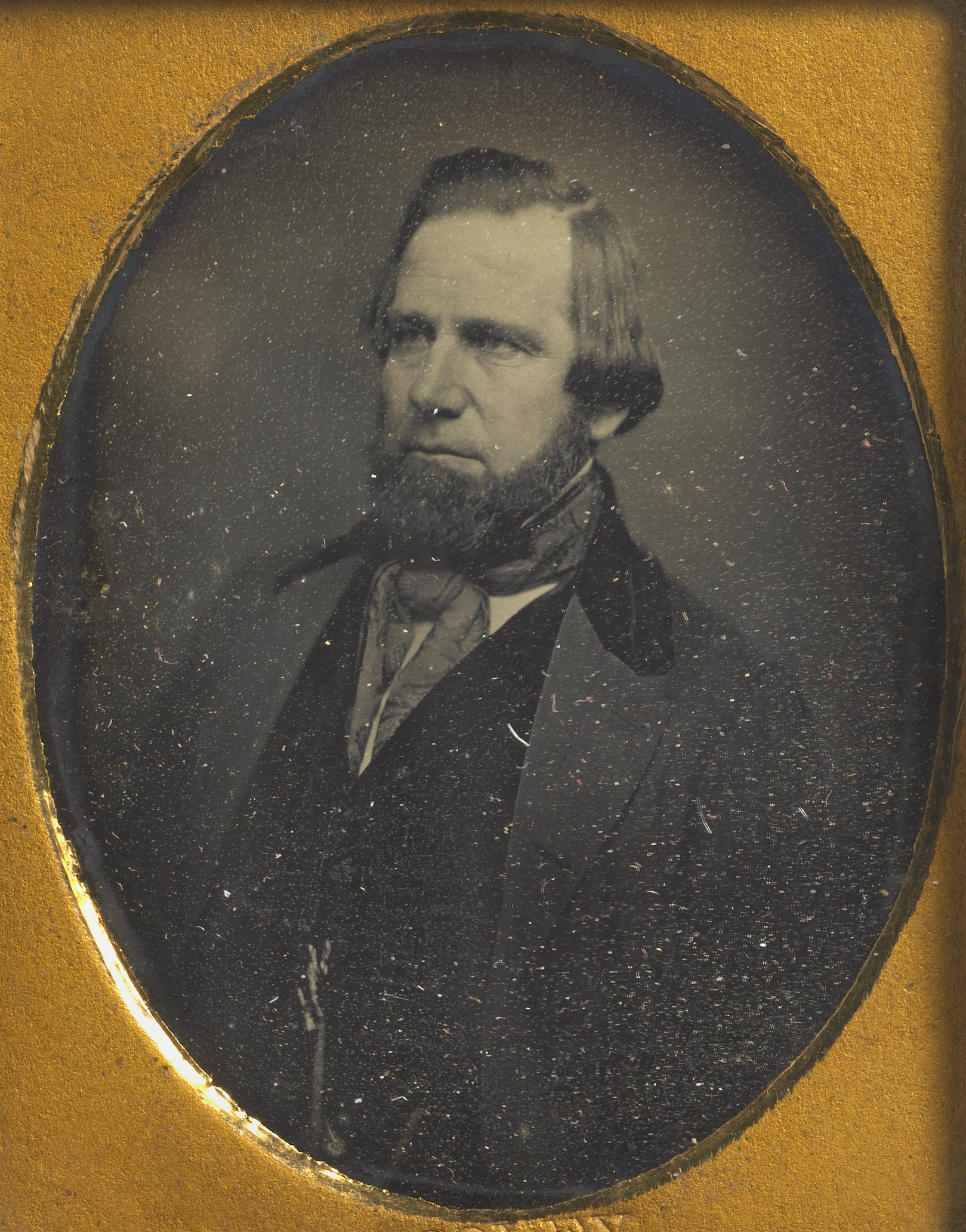
- William Howe
- Born: May 12, 1803; Spencer, Massachusetts, U.S.
- Died: September 19, 1852 (aged 49); Springfield, Massachusetts, U.S.
- Occupations: Architect, engineer

William Howe (May 12, 1803 – September 19, 1852) was an American architect and bridge builder famous for patenting the Howe truss design for bridges in 1840.

== Life and career ==
William Howe was born on May 12, 1803, in Spencer, Massachusetts, to Elijah and Fanny (née Bemis) Howe. His father owned a sawmill, He was a hard-working child, and learned carpentry and construction at an early age. After successfully completing an apprenticeship in carpentry, he enrolled and graduated from Leicester Academy in Leicester, Massachusetts.

Howe married Azubah Stone, daughter of a Charlton, Massachusetts, farmer (and sister of Amasa Stone) in 1828. The Howe family was an inventive one. Howe's nephew, Elias Howe, patented the first viable sewing machine. Howe's older brother, Tyler Howe, invented the box spring bed. William Howe established a career as a construction contractor, building homes and churches. He was particularly well-known for his churches. But bridges were his primary interest, and he founded the Howe Bridge Works in 1840.

In 1840, Howe was engaged to build a railroad bridge over the Connecticut River in Springfield, Massachusetts. This famous bridge was of a new, influential design—the Howe truss bridge, which Howe patented in 1840. One of Howe's workmen, Amasa Stone, purchased for $40,000 ($1,290,000 in 2025 dollars) in 1842 the rights to Howe's patented bridge design. (Amasa Stone received financial backing from Azariah Boody, a Springfield businessman.) The rights to the patent extended to bridges and structures erected only in New England. That same year, the two men formed a bridge-building firm, Boody, Stone & Co., which erected a large number of Howe truss bridges throughout New England.

Howe made additional improvements, and patented a second Howe truss design in 1846.

William Howe suffered a severe carriage accident and died on September 19, 1852. He was buried in Springfield.

== Bibliography ==
- Allen, Richard Sanders (1943). Covered Bridge Topics. Holliston, Mass.: National Society for the Preservation of Covered Bridges.
- Daughters of the American Revolution (1898). Lineage Book. Washington, D.C.: National Society of the Daughters of the American Revolution.
- Epler, Percy H. (January 1911). "Little Visits to the Home's of Worcester County's Famous Sons and Daughters". The Worcester Magazine Illustrated. pp. 349–357.
- Haddad, Gladys (2007). Flora Stone Mather: Daughter of Cleveland's Euclid Avenue and Ohio's Western Reserve. Kent, Ohio: Kent State University Press. ISBN 978-0-87338-899-3.
- Hendrickson, Kenneth E. (2015). The Encyclopedia of the Industrial Revolution in World History. Lanham, Md.: Rowman & Littlefield. ISBN 9780810888883.
- Johnson, Crisfield (1879). History of Cuyahoga County, Ohio: With Portraits and Biographical Sketches of Its Prominent Men and Pioneers. Philadelphia: D.W. Ensign.
- Knoblock, Glenn A. (2012). Historic Iron and Steel Bridges in Maine, New Hampshire and Vermont. Jefferson, N.C.: McFarland & Company. ISBN 9780786448432.
