= Thompson Pond (Massachusetts) =

Lake of the United States of America

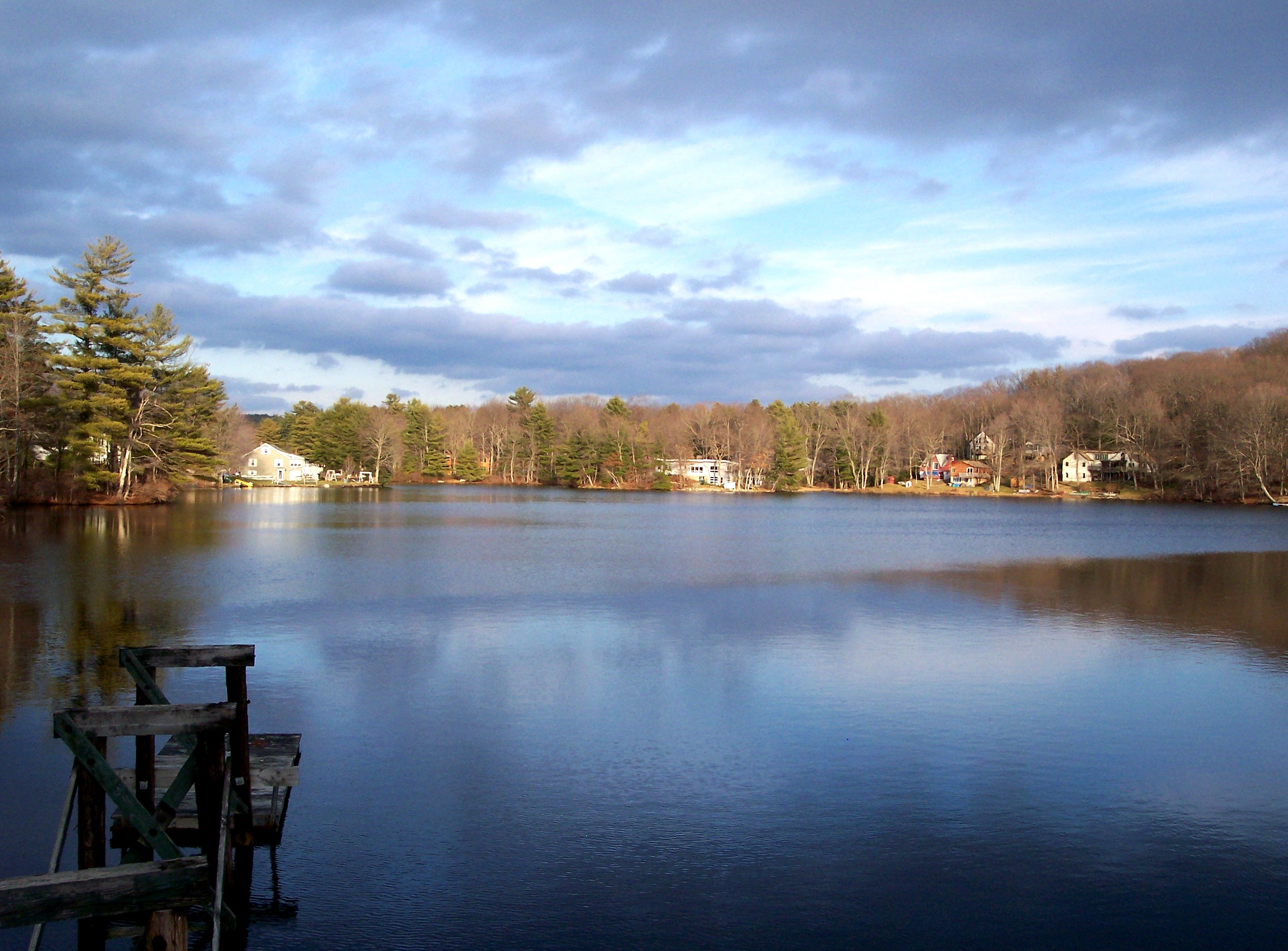
- From the 4-H Campsite

- Location within Massachusetts Location within the United States
- Location: Spencer, Massachusetts, United States
- Coordinates: 42°18′09″N 71°58′17″W
- Type: Pond
- Catchment area: 18 mi² (46.62 km²)
- Basin countries: United States
- Surface area: 116 acres (47 ha)
- Average depth: 8 ft (2.4 m)
- Max. depth: 21 ft (6.4 m)
- Shore length^{1}: 3.3 mi (5.3 km)
- Surface elevation: 860 ft (260 m)
- Settlements: Spencer, Paxton
- ^{1} Shore length is not a well-defined measure.

Thompson Pond is a fresh water pond in central Massachusetts, near North Spencer and Paxton. It is part of the Chicopee River Watershed.

== Topography ==
Turkey Hill Brook starts at Turkey Hill Pond, works its way down to Eames Pond (Moore State Park) and eventually joins Caruth Brook to form Thompson Pond. Turkey Hill Brook flows into the Seven Mile River. At one time, this creek had seven dams on it. Thompson Pond comprises approximately 116 acres (0.47 km^{2}). An earthen dam, approximately 150 ft (46 m) in length with a 50 ft (15 m) long concrete spillway, forms the pond.

Caruth Brook drains huge wetlands to the north and west of Thompson Pond.

== Information ==
Thompson Pond is within the Spencer State Forest reservation.

The Worcester County 4-H Club maintains a summer camp, Camp Marshall, on its shores. Camp Marshall was originally built as a Civilian Conservation Corps Camp in the 1930s. In 1948 the state provided a lease for a residential camp program.

== Fishing ==
Thompson Pond offers good fishing for many warm water fish. A survey conducted in 1994, showed thirteen species including Large and Small-mouth Bass, Chain Pickerel, Yellow Perch, White Perch, Black Crappie, Bluegill, Pumpkinseed, Brown and Yellow Bullhead, Golden Shiner, and Sucker.
