= Spencer State Forest =

Protected area in Massachusetts, United States

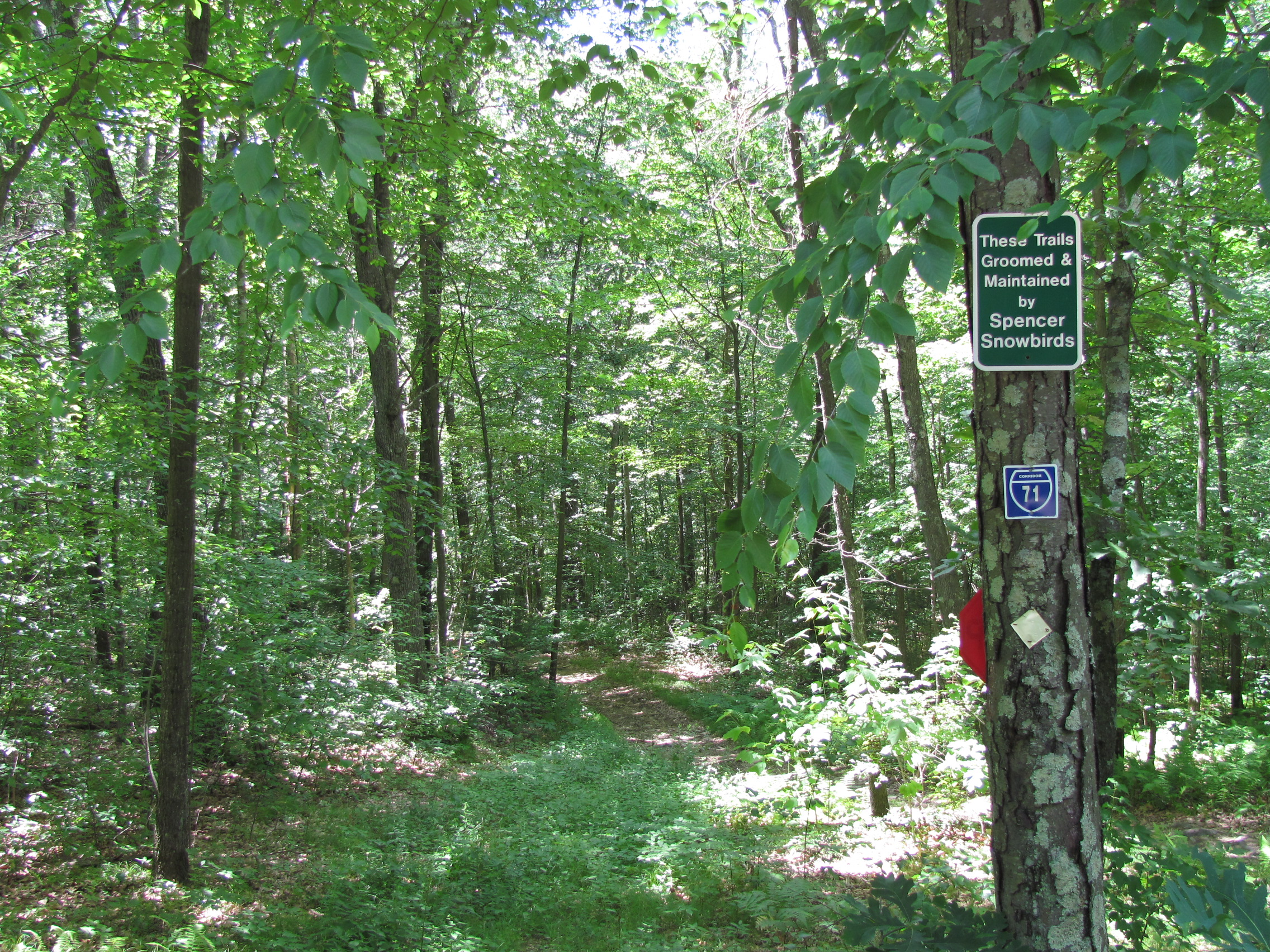
- Corridor 71

- Location within Massachusetts Location within the United States
- Location: Spencer, Massachusetts, United States
- Coordinates: 42°12′43″N 71°59′57″W
- Area: 903 acres (365 ha)
- Elevation: 666 ft (203 m)
- Established: 1922
- Administrator: Massachusetts Department of Conservation and Recreation
- Website: Official website

Spencer State Forest is a Massachusetts state forest and recreation reserve located in the town of Spencer, managed by the Massachusetts Department of Conservation and Recreation. The 92-mile (148 km) Midstate Trail passes through the state forest. The Commonwealth of Massachusetts also conducts logging in some parts of the property.

== Geography ==
Spencer State Forest is divided among three non-contiguous parcels. The most notable of these, located in south Spencer, is the Howe Pond parcel, an estate formerly belonging to Elias Howe, the inventor of the sewing machine. The overall geography includes hilly terrain, creeks, wetlands, and transitional oak-hickory to northern hardwood forest types.

== Activities and amenities ==
The Howe Pond parcel (historically referred to as Howe State Park) includes a mill pond and dam constructed by the inventor. The Howe Pond parcel also includes picnic tables and outdoor grills. It is located off Massachusetts Route 31 via Howe Pond Road.

=== Trails ===
The 92-mile Midstate Trail is the longest trail, marked by yellow triangles, and extends from Douglas State Forest at the Massachusetts/Rhode Island border in the south to New Hampshire. In Spencer, it enters from Charlton via Four Chimneys Wildlife Area on Borkum Road traversing Spencer State Forest sections on East Charlton Road, Ash Street, then leads off-street through both private lands and the forest to R Jones Road where it crosses a primitive parking lot continuing on through Spencer's newly designated Sibley/Warner Farm conservation lands through to Route 9 near the Spencer/Leicester line.

The Midstate Trail connects Spencer State Forest parcels, Moose Hill and Buck Hill Wildlife Management Areas, Sugden Reservoir, Thompson and Browning Ponds, Camp Marshall 4-H Camp, Treasure Valley Boy Scout reservation, Sampson's Pebble geological feature and leads into the town of Oakham. In Spencer, Midstate Trail parking is roadside at East Charlton and I Capen Roads and in the Buck Hill areas.

The trail north of Route 9 through Moose Hill Wildlife Management Area crosses the Moose Hill levee pond, created in the 1960s for flood control. The former 1960s-era Moose Hill ski area ferried skiers on a hay wagon, truck bed and primitive rope tow up to the top of Moose Hill above the levee area.

The upper section of Spencer State Forest is in northern Spencer, in the area of Turkey Hill Brook. A primitive lean-to for overnight campers is located on the property atop the 1,014-foot (309 m) drumlin Buck Hill. A parking lot is located off McCormick Road in Spencer.

The areas comprising the Spencer State Forest and adjacent Wildlife Management Areas (WMA), Howe and Browning Ponds, Sugden Reservoir and the following brooks provide a range of water resources.

Turkey Hill Brook flows from Paxton to Spencer in the northeast corner of town. Dams were erected along the brook to power the wire mills that dotted this area, but the only remaining dam is the one that forms Thompson Pond. The brook joins the Seven Mile River northeast of Pine Grove Cemetery.

The Seven Mile River originates in Rutland and was dammed to form Browning Pond. It merges with Turkey Hill Brook and connects to the Quaboag River in East Brookfield. Seven miles from Brookfield, the river served as a landmark when Brookfield was the only settlement between Worcester and the Connecticut Valley.

Cranberry River flows from Charlton and was dammed to form Cranberry Meadow Pond in the southeast corner of town and dammed again to form Howe Pond at Howe State Park, joining the Seven Mile River near Route 9.

The Depot Trail, Spencer's rail trail, is a 2.5-mile walking trail along an abandoned railroad bed running from South Spencer Road to Chestnut Street, and connects into Spencer State Forest trails. There is a lower section of Howe Pond with benches, fishing and portaged watercraft launching. Trail parking is adjacent to the railroad overpass parking on South Spencer Road.
