= Frank Bird =

Frank Bird may refer to:

- Frank Bird (baseball)
- Frank Bird (racing driver)
