= Sugden =

Sugden refers to:

== Persons ==
=== Arts and entertainment ===
See § Fictional characters section for soap opera characters

- Chris Sugden (1952–2024), English humorist (Sid Kipper)
- Mollie Sugden (1922–2009), English comedy actress
- Philip Sugden (artist), (born 1949), English artist
- Rhian Sugden (born 1986), English model and actress

=== Military ===
- Cecil Sugden (1903–1963), British Army officer (Master-General of the Ordnance)
- Richard Sugden (1871–1951), British army officer (brigadier-general)

=== Politics ===
- Claire Sugden (born 1986), Northern Ireland politician (Independent Unionist MLA)
- Edward Sugden, 1st Baron St Leonards (1781–1875), British jurist and politician
- Thomas Sugden (farmer-politician) (1810–1883), Wisconsin, United States pioneer, farmer, Wisconsin State Assembly member
- Wilfrid Sugden (1879–1960), British Conservative Party MP

=== Religion ===
- Edward Sugden (methodist) (1854–1935), English-born Australian Methodist minister, first master of Queen's College, University of Melbourne
- John Sugden (died 1897), English bishop (Free Church of England)

=== Science and academia ===
- David E. Sugden, British glaciologist and geomorphologist
- Morris Sugden (1919–1984), English chemist (combustion research)
- Philip Sugden (historian) (1947–2014), English historian, notably of Jack the Ripper
- Robert Sugden (economist) (born 1949), English behavioural economist
- Samuel Sugden (1892–1950), English chemist (professor of physical chemistry)

=== Sport ===
- Chad Sugden (born 1994), British boxer and kickboxer
- Craig Sugden (born 1974), South African cricketer
- Jotham Sugden (born 2001), English curler
- Louise Sugden (born 1984), British powerlifter, wheelchair basketball player
- Mark Sugden (1902–1990), Irish rugby union player
- Ronald Sugden (1896–1971), English cricketer and Royal Air Force officer
- Ryan Sugden (born 1980), English footballer (Oldham, Chester, Morecambe, Halifax et al.)
- Sidney Sugden (1880–1930), English footballer (Nottingham Forest, QPR, Brentford et al.)
- Tim Sugden (born 1964), British racing driver
- Yvonne Sugden (born 1939), British figure skater

=== Other fields ===
- Percy Sugden (architect) (1864–1936), English architect in Georgia, United States
- Samuel Sugden (merchant) (1798–1896), English merchant

=== Fictional characters ===
- The Sugden family, a family in the British soap opera Emmerdale
- Percy Sugden, a character in the British soap opera Coronation Street

== Places ==
- Sugden, Oklahoma, USA

== Other uses ==
- Sugden Audio, British hi-fi and audio equipment manufacturer
- Sugden Award, British award for combustion research
- Sugden Reservoir, Massachusetts, United States
- The Absence of Mr Sugden, 1965 Australian TV play
