= Tyler Howe =

American inventor and manufacturer

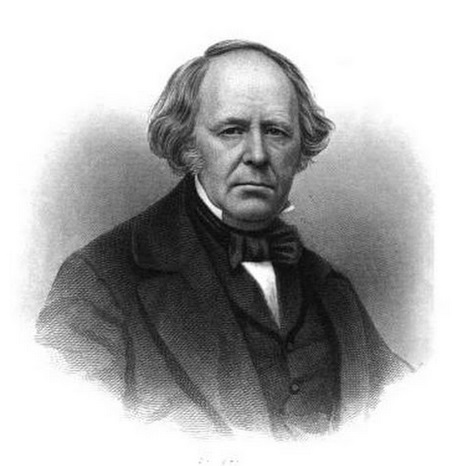
- Tyler Howe about 1870
- Born: August 11, 1800; Spencer, Massachusetts, U.S.
- Died: June 9, 1880 (aged 79); Cambridge, Massachusetts, U.S.
- Occupations: Inventor, manufacturer
- Known for: Inventing the box-spring bed
- Spouse: Marcia Ann Prouty (d. 1872)
- Children: William, Otis, Lorinda, Lydia, Thomas J.G., and John Edward

Tyler Howe (/haʊ/; August 11, 1800 – June 9, 1880) was an American inventor and manufacturer who developed the first box-spring bed.

== Life and career ==
Tyler Howe was born on August 11, 1800, to Elijah and Frances (née Bemis) (Note: Elijah Howe died on January 9, 1816. On December 14, 1826, Fanny married Aaron Banister. In genealogical listings, she is sometimes referred to as "Fanny Banister".) Howe in Spencer, Massachusetts. He was the fifth of 10 children, (Note: His other siblings included Elijah Jr., born 1790; Elias Sr., born 1792; Francis, born 1795; Liberty, born 1798; Alphonso, born 1805; Hiram, born 1808; Elbridge Gerry, born 1810; and Sarah Anne, born 1812.) and the fifth-eldest son. His father was a farmer who spent many hours improving his own farm equipment. Tyler was born in their family's one-room farmhouse, known as Howe's Mills.

Howe was educated in the local public schools, and spent his childhood and teen years assisting on the farm as well as at his father's gristmill and sawmill. In 1833, having invented a machine that cut palm leaves into strips for weaving into hats, Howe moved to Watertown, Massachusetts, and established a palm leaf factory there. He moved his business to the neighborhood of Cambridgeport in nearby Cambridge, Massachusetts, in 1835.

=== The box-spring bed ===
Hearing of the 1848 California Gold Rush, Howe sailed around South America through the Drake Passage to reach California. He returned to Massachusetts in 1850, having run out of money and found no gold. The trip to California was a harsh one, particularly the sleeping accommodations. Beds consisted of little more than planks of wood nailed to a frame, and the slightest movement of the ship was transferred to the sleeper—making for restless sleep, and often inducing seasickness. Determined to invent an improved bed, Howe began work on a bed in which elliptical springs supported free-floating slats, and the frame of the bed kept the slats in a rectangular shape.

In 1853, Tyler Howe developed the first box-spring bed. He established a factory in Cambridgeport to begin manufacture of his invention, on which he received a patent in 1855. With his second-eldest son, Otis, he formed a company, Tyler Howe & Co., that same year to manufacture and market the box-spring. The company later changed its name to Howe Spring-Bed Company, and opened a showroom at 173 Canal Street in New York City. Howe and his son later patented a number of improvements to the box-spring, and Howe became very wealthy.

Howe was healthy and still working at his factory even at the end of his life. He died on June 9, 1880, at his home in Cambridge, several days after suffering a stroke.

== Personal life ==
Tyler Howe married Marcia Ann Prouty (also of Spencer, Massachusetts) on March 31, 1822. She died in 1872. The couple had six children.

Howe's younger brother, William (born in 1803) invented the Howe truss bridge. His nephew, Elias Howe, Jr., invented the first practical sewing machine.

== Bibliography ==
- Allen, Richard Sanders (1943). Covered Bridge Topics. Holliston, Mass.: National Society for the Preservation of Covered Bridges.
- Carter, Charles Frederick (July 1909). "The Howes—An Inventive New England Family". Munsey's Magazine. pp. 596–601.
- Daughters of the American Revolution (1936). Lineage Book. Washington, D.C.: National Society of the Daughters of the American Revolution.
- Epler, Percy H. (January 1911). "Little Visits to the Home's of Worcester County's Famous Sons and Daughters". The Worcester Magazine Illustrated. pp. 349–357.
- Van Dulken, Stephen (2001). Inventing the 19th Century: 100 Inventions That Shaped the Victorian Age, From Aspirin to the Zeppelin. New York: New York University Press. ISBN 9780814788103.
- Van Slyck, J.D. (1879). New New England Manufacturers and Manufactories: Three Hundred and Fifty of the Leading Manufacturers of New England. Vol. 1. Boston: Van Slyck Company.
- Wilson, Paul C. (2016). How Inventions Really Happen: The Sewing Machine Story, in Five Lives. Indianapolis: Dog Ear Publishing. ISBN 9781457546716.
