= Browning Pond =

Lake in the U.S. state of Massachusetts

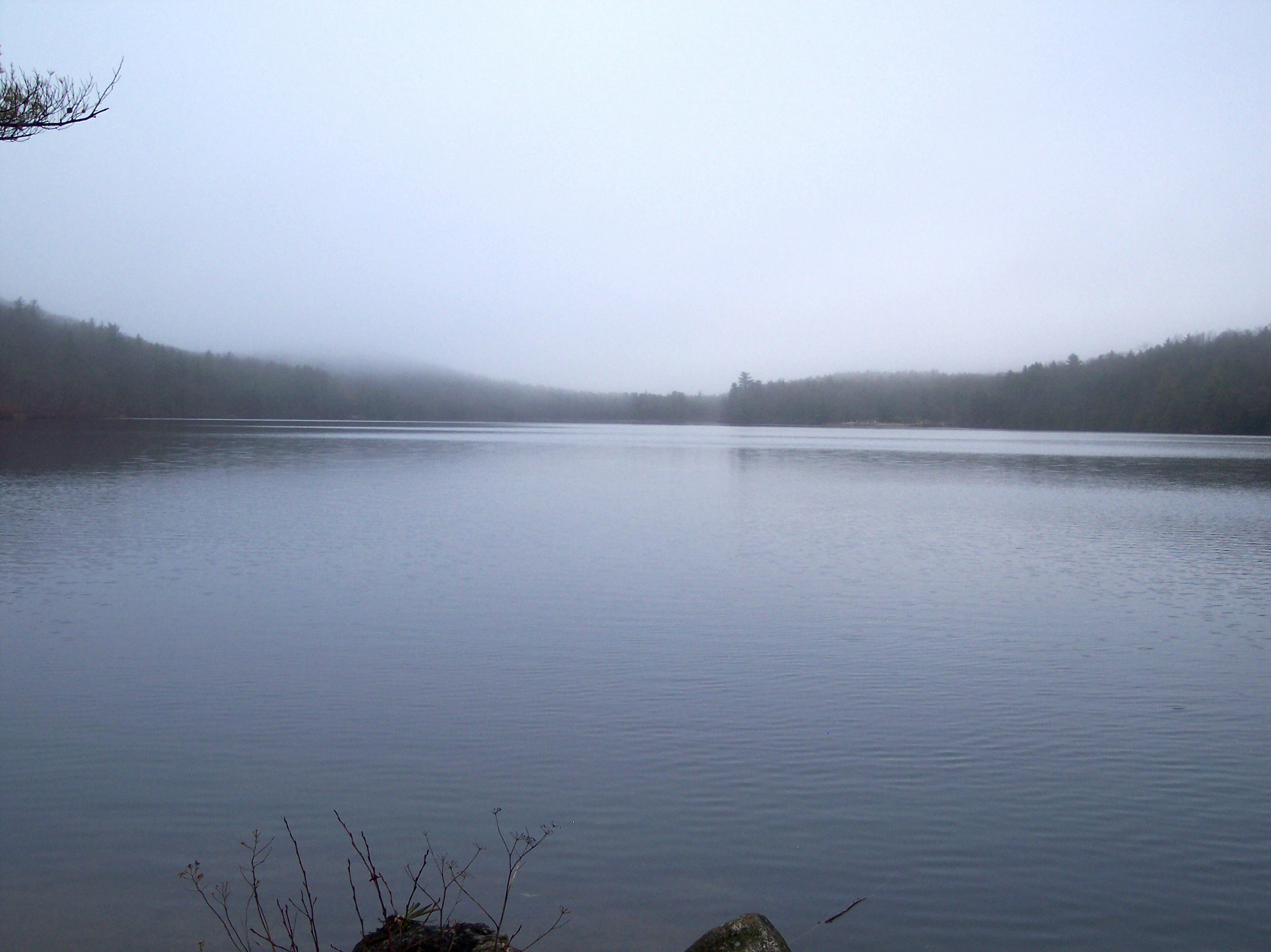
- at Treasure Valley

- Location within Massachusetts Location within the United States
- Location: Oakham / Spencer, Massachusetts, United States
- Coordinates: 42°18′53″N 71°59′51″W
- Type: Pond
- Primary outflows: 15 ft³/s (0.42 m³/s)
- Catchment area: 12 mi² (31 km²)
- Basin countries: United States
- Max. length: 1 m (3 ft 3 in)
- Max. width: 0.25 m (9.8 in)
- Surface area: 89 acres (36 ha)
- Average depth: 10 ft (3.0 m)
- Max. depth: 42 ft (13 m)
- Shore length^{1}: 2 mi (3.31 km)
- Surface elevation: 745 ft (227 m)
- ^{1} Shore length is not a well-defined measure.

Browning Pond is located in Oakham and Spencer, Massachusetts. This 89-acre (360,000 m^{2}) great pond forms the headwaters of the Seven Mile River. It is part of the Chicopee River Watershed.

== Information ==
A boat ramp is located at the southwest corner of the pond, along Browning Pond Road. In March 2025, the Commonwealth of Massachusetts, Department of Fish and Game, Office of Fishing and Boating access, acquired about 12 acres of land including the boat ramp and announced plans to improve public access to the pond. Other lands adjacent to the pond are privately owned.

The water is dark colored, but has a moderately high transparency of 10 feet (3.0 m). Aquatic vegetation and fallen trees provide cover and are scattered along the shoreline and in the northern cove. There is an old abandoned mine shaft that was used for mining copper. It can be found with the proper gear in the middle of the pond. There are also sunken rowboats and sailboats as well.

Browning Pond is fed from numerous small-unnamed brooks and extended wetlands that run from Paxton and Rutland on the north and Oakham on west. There is a ridge in the Rutland State Park that divides the waters. Waters to its north flow into Long Pond, becoming part of the Ware River watershed, and waters to its south flow into Browning Pond.

== Fishing ==
A 1979 fish sampling effort indicated a fish population composed of Largemouth Bass, Chain Pickerel, Yellow and White Perch, Bluegills, Pumpkinseeds, Red Breasted Sunfish, Black Crappie, Brown Bullheads, Rainbow and Brook Trout, White Suckers, Golden Shiners, Chub Suckers and Darters.

Browning Pond is managed for both warm water and cold-water fish. It is stocked with Trout in both the spring and autumn. Because it is somewhat acidic, Brook Trout are usually stocked in early spring, while Rainbow and Brown Trout are generally stocked in mid to late spring and fall. A limited amount of cold-water habitat persists through the summer and Trout can be expected in the deeper areas during the summer months. An excellent Largemouth Bass population is present and many large Bass were taken during the 1979 survey.

The best fishing should be along the northern and eastern shores, as weed growth is most abundant in these areas. Pan fish are abundant and provide good fishing. Yellow Perch and Bullheads are of good size.

== Coordinates ==
- 42°18′48″N 71°59′46″W Pond center
- 42°18′30″N 71°59′46″W Dam
