= Sugden Reservoir =

Reservoir in Spencer, Massachusetts

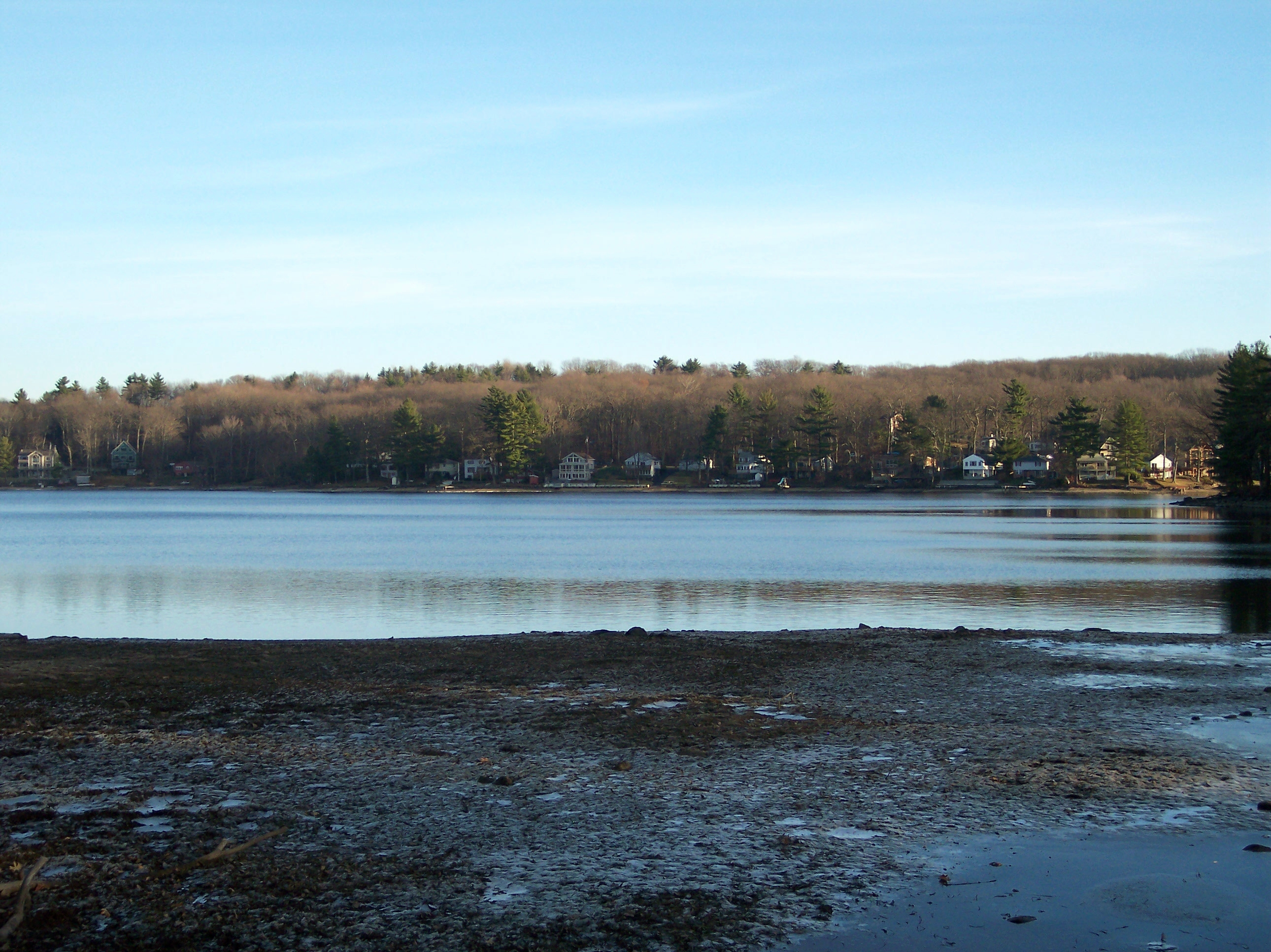

- Location within Massachusetts Location within the United States
- Location: Spencer, Massachusetts, United States
- Coordinates: 42°16′17″N 71°58′06″W
- Type: Reservoir
- Primary outflows: 35 ft³/s (0.99 m³/s)
- Catchment area: 18 mi² (46.62 km²)
- Basin countries: United States
- Surface area: 85.3 acres (34.5 ha)
- Average depth: 11 ft (3.4 m)
- Max. depth: 22 ft (6.7 m)
- Shore length^{1}: 2 mi (3.2 km)
- Surface elevation: 840 ft (260 m)
- Settlements: Spencer, Paxton
- ^{1} Shore length is not a well-defined measure.

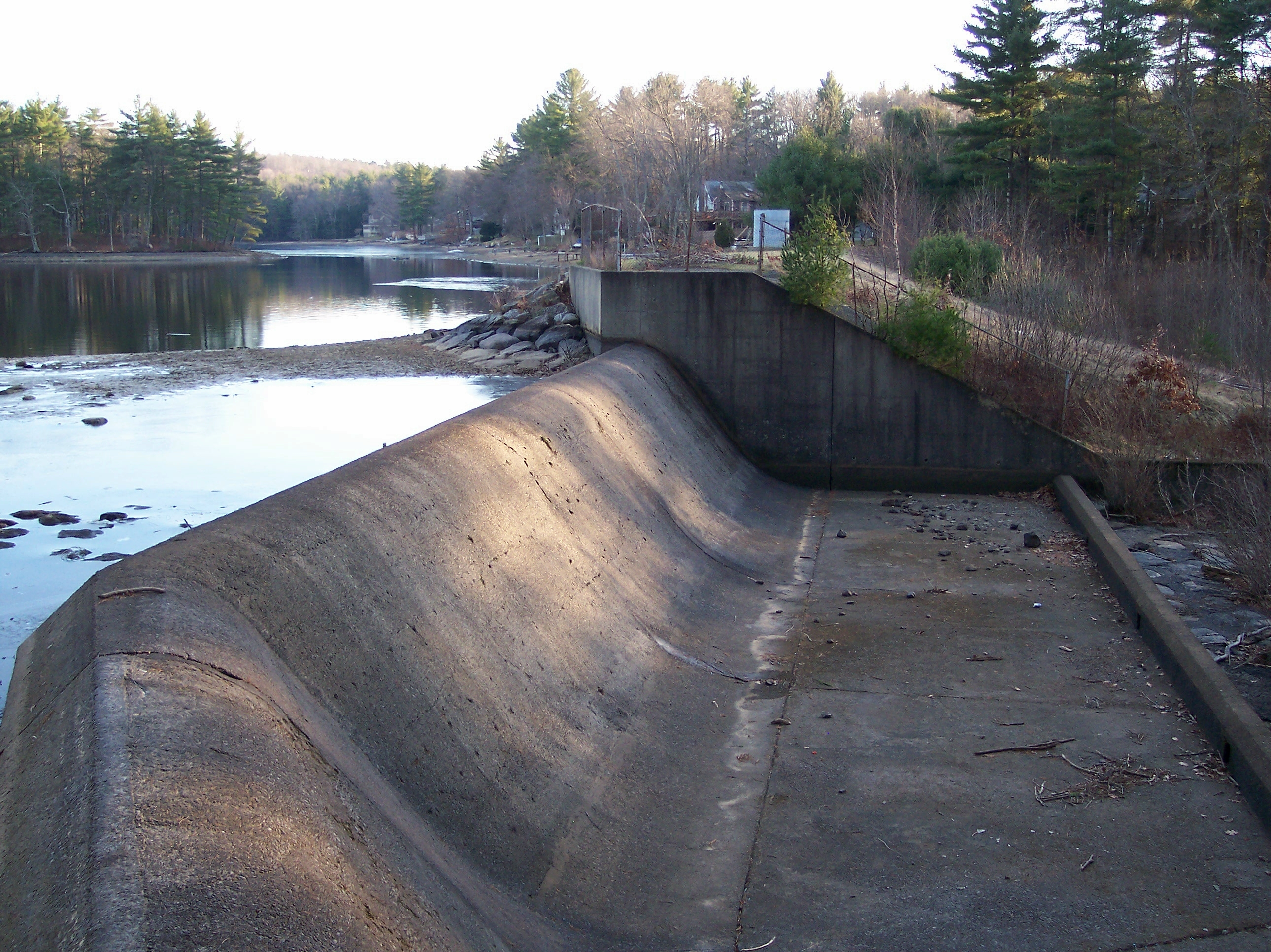
Sugden Reservoir Dam

The Sugden Reservoir is a Massachusetts reservoir located in Spencer, Massachusetts. It forms the headwaters of Shaw Brook, which is a tributary to Turkey Hill Creek, a major tributary to the Seven Mile River. This water body is part of the Chicopee River Watershed.

== History ==
Created near the top of Turkey Hill, the Sugden Reservoir Dam impounds the waters of Shaw Brook and Turkey Hill Creek, creating the Sugden Reservoir for waterpower storage. This waterpower supplied industry in both the Upper and Lower Wire Village, sections of North Spencer, Massachusetts. . The first wire-making industry in the country used this watershed for waterpower. Owned first by the Prouty Brothers (a famous Spencer Family), a wire mill that became Wickwire-Spencer, was purchased by Richard Sugden who improved the mills by creating the Sugden Reservoir in 1882. At one time, Spencer had eleven factories and twenty-six buildings for wire drawing along Turkey Hill Creek and the Seven Mile River. Never used for potable water, this reservoir provided only industrial waterpower storage. The energy storage was considerable because of the high elevation of this reservoir relative to the mouth of Turkey Creek where it enters the Seven Mile River.

== Present use ==
Nowadays, this reservoir is a recreational lake with many private residences lining its shores. There remains limited public access near the dam. Other portions of the reservoir remain posted as private property. Although initially privately owned, the reservoir is now owned by the town of Spencer.

== Notability ==
This reservoir has a dam, which lists in Massachusetts as a High Hazard dam. This does not mean that there is anything wrong with the dam. Instead, it means that, if it failed, there would likely be a loss of life. This dam impounds reservoir waters near the top of a hill. The residential valley below would suffer considerably should this dam fail, which is the primary reason for this classification.

== Geography ==
There are many small brooks and creeks in this area, which are part of the Seven Mile River, and the larger, Chicopee River watershed. Locals often use the waterway names interchangeably. Often the names change when encountering another owner's property.
