= Jim McCormick (infielder) =

American baseball player (1868–1948)

- Infielder
- Born: November 2, 1868; Spencer, Massachusetts, U.S.
- Died: February 1, 1948 (aged 79); Saco, Maine, U.S.
- Batted: Right Threw: Right

MLB debut
- September 9, 1892, for the St. Louis Browns

Last MLB appearance
- September 10, 1892, for the St. Louis Browns

MLB statistics
- Batting average: .000
- Home runs: 0
- Runs batted in: 0
- Stats at Baseball Reference

Teams
- St. Louis Browns (1892)

James Ambrose McCormick (November 2, 1868 – February 1, 1948) was a 19th-century American Major League Baseball infielder. He played for the St. Louis Browns of the National League in 1892.
