= 34th Massachusetts Infantry Regiment =

34th Massachusetts Volunteer Infantry
- Active: August 1, 1862 – July 2, 1865
- Country: United States
- Allegiance: Union
- Branch: Infantry
- Type: Regiment
- Size: 1,309
- Engagements: Battle of Charlestown; Third Battle of Winchester; Battle of Fisher's Hill; Battle of Cedar Creek; Siege of Petersburg; Appomattox Campaign; Third Battle of Petersburg; Battle of Appomattox Court House

Commanders
- Colonel: George D. Wells
- Colonel: William Sever Lincoln

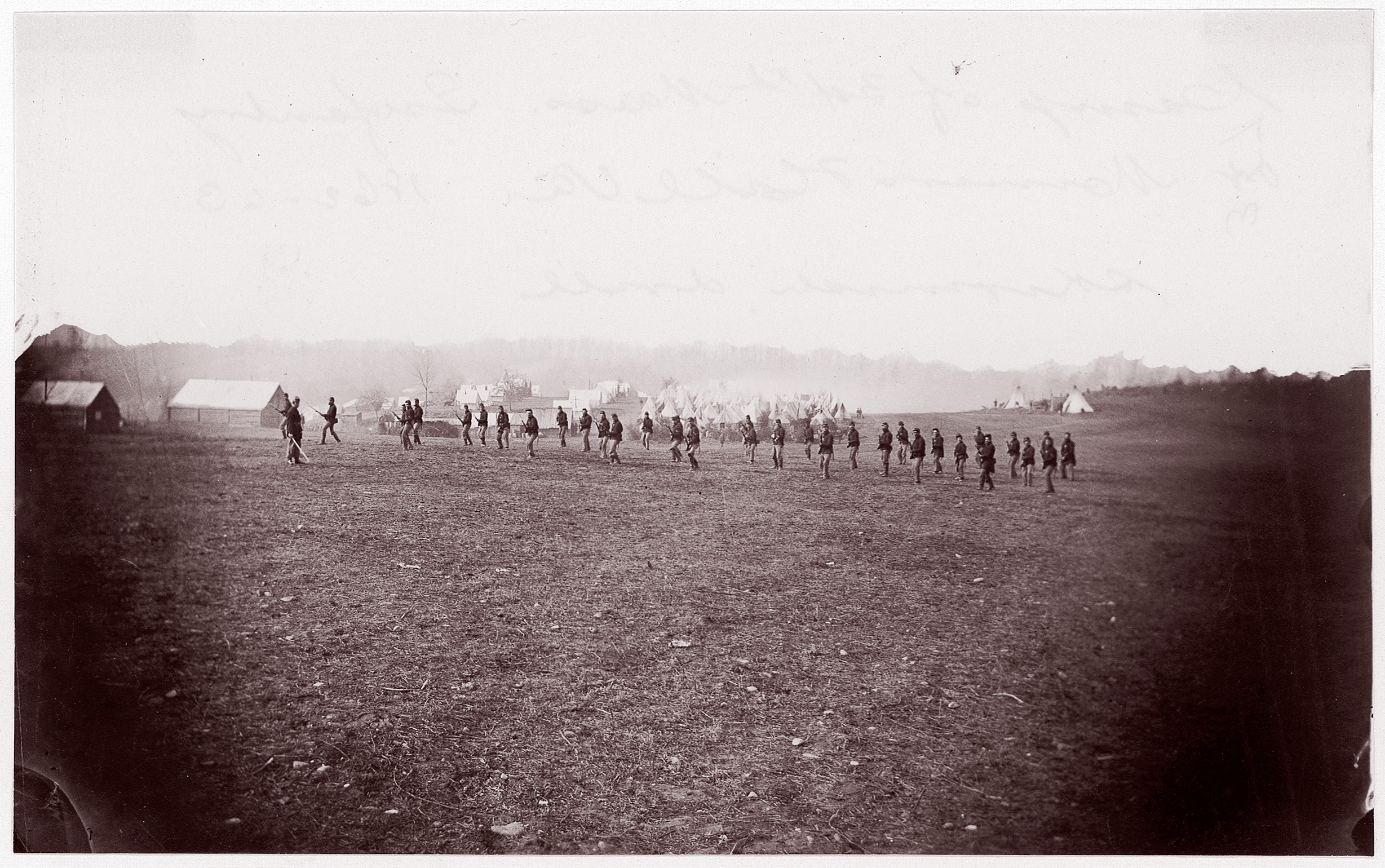
Camp of 34th Massachusetts Infantry

The 34th Regiment Massachusetts Volunteer Infantry was an infantry regiment that served in the Union Army during the American Civil War.

== Service ==
The 34th Massachusetts Infantry was organized at Worcester, Massachusetts and mustered in for a three-year enlistment on August 1, 1862 under the command of Colonel George D. Wells.

The regiment was attached to Military District of Washington and Alexandria to February 1863. Tyler's Brigade, District of Alexandria, XXII Corps, Department of Washington, to April 1863. 2nd Brigade, DeRussy's Division, Defenses South of the Potomac, XXII Corps, to June 1863. Martindale's Command, Garrison of Washington, XXII Corps, to July 1863. 1st Brigade, Maryland Heights Division, Department of West Virginia, to December 1863. 1st Brigade, 1st Division, Department of West Virginia, to January 1864. Unattached, 1st Division, Department of West Virginia, to April 1864. 2nd Brigade, 1st Infantry Division, Department of West Virginia, to June 1864. 1st Brigade, 1st Infantry Division, Department of West Virginia, to December 1864. 1st Brigade, Independent Division, XXIV Corps, Army of the James, to June 1865.

The 34th Massachusetts Infantry mustered out of service on June 16, 1865 and was discharged July 2, 1865.

== Detailed service ==
Moved to Washington, D.C., August 15–17. At Arlington Heights, Va., until August 22, 1862. Moved to Alexandria, Va., August 22, and duty on line of Orange & Alexandria Railroad until September 10. At Fort Lyon, defenses of Washington, D.C., September 15, 1862 to June 2, 1863. Provost and guard duty in Washington until July 9. Moved to Maryland Heights July 9. Occupation of Harpers Ferry, W. Va., July 14. Duty at Harpers Ferry and Bolivar until December 10. Action at Berryville. October 18. Raid to Harrisonburg December 10–24. At Harpers Ferry until February 1, 1864. Operations in Hampshire and Hardy Counties, W. Va., January 27 – February 7. Moved to Cumberland, Md., February 15. Return to Harpers Ferry, then moved to Monocacy, Md., March 5, to Martinsburg, W. Va., March 7 and to Harpers Ferry April 2. Moved to Martinsburg, W. Va., April 17. Sigel's Expedition from Martinsburg to New Market April 13 – May 16. Rude's Hill May 14. New Market May 14–15. Advance to Staunton May 24 – June 5. Piedmont, Mount Crawford, June 5. Occupation of Staunton June 6. Hunter's Raid on Lynchburg June --. Lynchburg June 17–18. Retreat to the Gaul June 18–29. Moved to the Shenandoah Valley July 5–17. Snicker's Ferry July 17–18. Kernstown or Winchester July 23–24. Martinsburg July 25. Sheridan's Shenandoah Valley Campaign August to December. Berryville September 3. Battle of Opequan, Winchester, September 19. Fisher's Hill September 22. Cedar Creek October 13. Battle of Cedar Creek October 19. Duty at Kernstown until December. Moved to Washington, D.C., then to Bermuda Hundred, Va., December 19–23. Siege operations against Richmond and Petersburg December 25, 1864 to April 2, 1865. In the trenches north of the James River before Richmond until March 1865. Appomattox Campaign March 28 – April 9. Assault on and fall of Petersburg April 2. Pursuit of Lee April 3–9. Rice's Station April 6. Appomattox Court House April 9. Surrender of Lee and his army. March to Lynchburg April 12–15, then to Farmville and Burkesville Junction April 15–19, and to Richmond April 22–25. Duty there until June.

== Casualties ==
The regiment lost a total of 269 men during service; 7 officers and 128 enlisted men killed or mortally wounded, 2 officers and 132 enlisted men died of disease.

== Commanders ==
- Colonel George D. Wells
- Colonel William Sever Lincoln
- Major Harrison W. Pratt – commanded at the Third Battle of Winchester
- Captain Andrew Potter – commanded at the Battle of Cedar Creek

== Notable members ==
- 1st Sergeant Robert J. Gardner, Company K – Medal of Honor recipient for action at the Third Battle of Petersburg
- Sergeant Charles A. Hunter, Company E – Medal of Honor recipient for action at the Third Battle of Petersburg

== See also ==
- List of Massachusetts Civil War Units
- Massachusetts in the American Civil War
