= Robert J. Gardner =

- Born: September 28, 1837; Livingston, New York
- Died: September 23, 1902 (aged 64); Iosco, Michigan
- Burial place: Wright Cemetery, Iosco, Michigan
- Military career
- Allegiance: United States of America
- Branch: United States Army; Union Army
- Rank: First Sergeant
- Units: Company K, 34th Massachusetts Volunteer Infantry Regiment
- Conflicts: American Civil War • Third Battle of Petersburg
- Awards: Medal of Honor

Robert J. Gardner (September 28, 1837 – September 23, 1902) was an American soldier who fought in the American Civil War. Gardner received his country's highest award for bravery during combat, the Medal of Honor. Gardner's medal was won for being among the first to enter Fort Gregg during the Third Battle of Petersburg in Virginia on April 2, 1865. He was honored with the award on May 12, 1865.

Gardner joined the Army from Egremont, Massachusetts in July 1862, and mustered out with his regiment in June 1865. He was buried in Parkers Corners, Michigan.

== Medal of Honor citation ==
The President of the United States of America, in the name of Congress, takes pleasure in presenting the Medal of Honor to Sergeant Robert J. Gardner, United States Army, for extraordinary heroism on 2 April 1865, while serving with Company K, 34th Massachusetts Infantry, in action at Petersburg, Virginia. Sergeant Gardiner [sic] was among the first to enter Fort Gregg, clearing his way by using his musket on the heads of the enemy.

== See also ==
- List of American Civil War Medal of Honor recipients: G–L
