= Charles A. Hunter =

American Civil War Medal of Honor recipient

Charles Adams Hunter
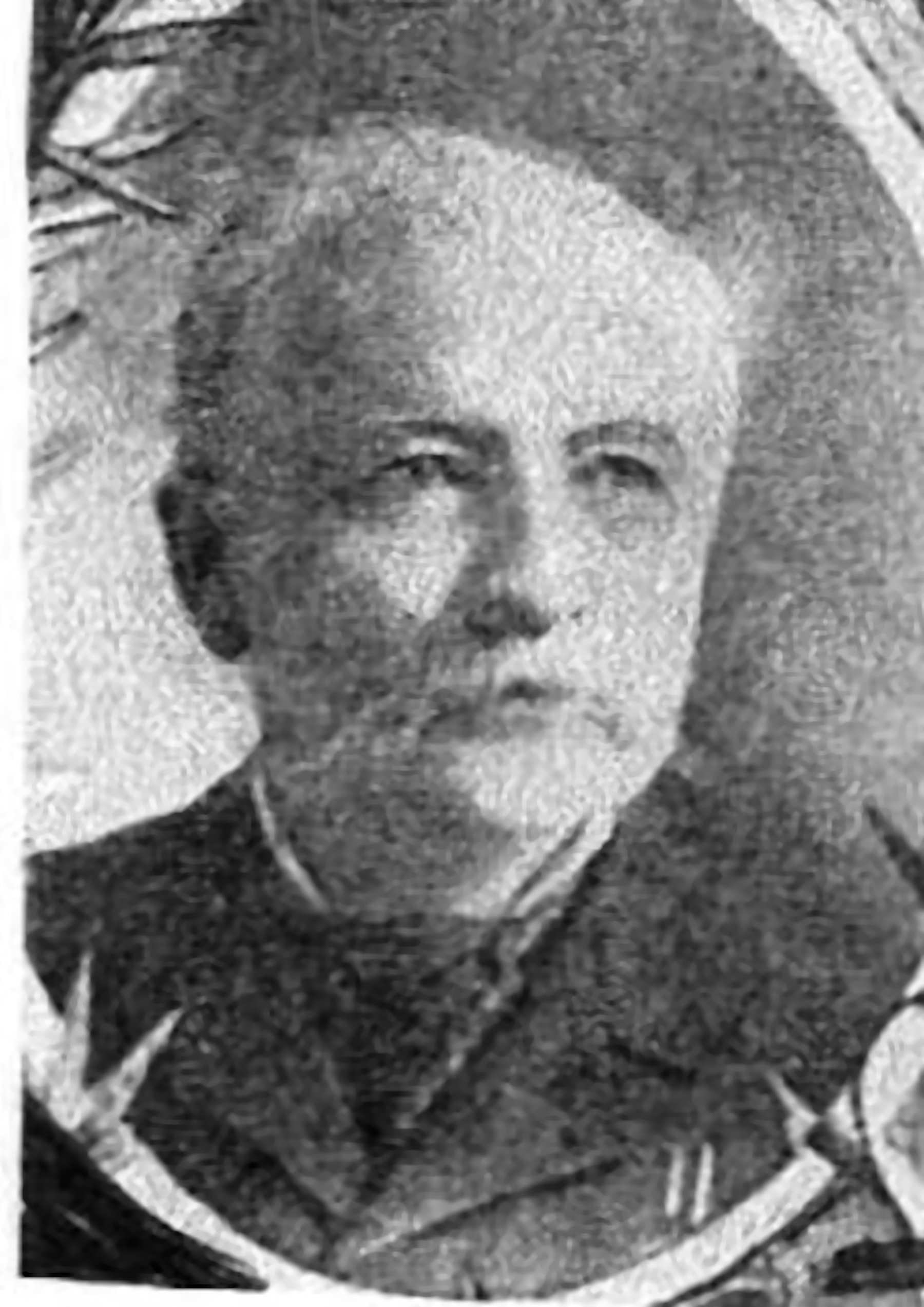
- Hunter in c. 1899
- Born: August 26, 1843; Spencer, Massachusetts
- Died: December 31, 1912 (aged 69); Ashland, Massachusetts
- Burial place: Pine Grove Cemetery, Spencer, Massachusetts
- Military career
- Allegiance: United States; Union
- Branch: United States Army; Union Army
- Service years: 1862–1865
- Rank: Sergeant
- Units: Company E, 34th Massachusetts Volunteer Infantry
- Conflicts: American Civil War
- Awards: Medal of Honor

Charles Adams Hunter (August 26, 1843 – December 31, 1912) was a soldier in the American Civil War who received the Medal of Honor for valor in action.

== Biography ==
Hunter was born in Spencer, Massachusetts on 26 August 1843. He joined the Army in June 1862, and first saw action at the Battle of Charlestown. He was promoted to corporal in November 1863, and would serve as a color guard or color bearer for his company in every battle in which they served. Hunter subsequently saw extensive action in the Shenandoah Valley, fighting at the Battles of New Market, Piedmont, Lynchburg, Snicker's Ford, Second Kernstown and Martinsburg, Halltown, Berryville, Third Winchester, Fisher's Hill, Stickney's Farm, and Cedar Creek.

With the conclusion of Sheridan's Valley campaign, the 34th Massachusetts Infantry moved to the Petersburg theater of war. During the final assault on Petersburg on April 2, 1865, Hunter was among the first of his company to enter Fort Gregg in the defensive works, bearing the company's colors, an act for which he received the Medal of Honor. He was also promoted to sergeant at the end of the month. Hunter's medal was presented to him on June 13, 1865 by the wife of his commander, General John Gibbon, and he mustered out with his regiment three days later.

== Medal of Honor citation ==
Rank and organization: Sergeant, Company E, 34th Massachusetts Infantry. Place and date: At Petersburg, Va., April 2, 1865. Entered service at: Spencer, Mass. Birth: Spencer, Mass. Date of issue: May 12, 1865.

Citation:

In the assault on Fort Gregg, bore the regimental flag bravely and was among the foremost to enter the work.

== See also ==
- List of American Civil War Medal of Honor recipients: G–L
