= Edward Martell =

American chemist

- Born: Edward Ambrose Martell; February 23, 1918; Spencer, Massachusetts, U.S.
- Died: July 12, 1995 (aged 77)
- Education: United States Military Academy; University of Chicago (Ph.D.)
- Spouse: Marian Elizabeth Marks
- Children: 4
- Scientific career
- Fields: Radiochemistry
- Workplaces: University of Chicago; Air Force Cambridge Research Laboratories; National Center for Atmospheric Research
- Military career
- Allegiance: United States
- Branch: U.S. Army
- Rank: Second lieutenant
- Wars: World War II; Pacific War; Battle of Okinawa

Edward Ambrose Martell (February 23, 1918 – July 12, 1995) was an American radiochemist for the US National Center for Atmospheric Research (NCAR) in Boulder, Colorado. He fought fervently throughout his life against the medical establishment and the National Institute of Health for what he perceived to be insufficient research into radiation-induced lung cancer, particularly in regard to cigarette smoking.

== Education ==
Martell was born in Spencer, Massachusetts. He attended the U.S. Military Academy in West Point, New York. He was commissioned as a second lieutenant after graduating in 1942 and served in the Okinawa campaign of World War II, retiring with the rank of lieutenant colonel. He received a Ph.D. in radiochemistry from the University of Chicago in 1950. Willard Libby was Martell's mentor at the university through the late 1940s and early 1950s.

== Research ==
After receiving his Ph.D., he became a group leader at the Fermi Institute for Nuclear Studies at the University of Chicago and also took up a position at the Air Force Cambridge Research Laboratory in Bedford, Massachusetts. He managed radiation-effects projects studying a series of nuclear weapons tests in Nevada and the 1954 hydrogen bomb tests at the Bikini Atoll in the South Pacific.

In 1962, after witnessing the devastating effects of nuclear weapons, Martell decided to pursue a different direction in his life and took up a position as a radiochemist in the Atmospheric Chemistry Division at NCAR in Boulder, Colorado.

In 1980 he published a paper in Newscript in which he argued that radium progeny, particularly polonium-210, are responsible for the cancer-causing effects of cigarettes. He followed this up in 1983 with a subsequent research paper in which he calculated that smokers who die of lung cancer have been exposed to 80-100 rads of radiation.

In 1993 he published a paper in which he theorized that ionizing radiation in artesian groundwater was the energy source which fueled the evolution of DNA and the first living cells, after exchanging ideas with the University of Colorado's Nobel Prize-winning chemist Tom Cech. At the time of his death, he was working on a book called "Natural Radionuclides and Life".

== Positions and efforts ==
During his time at NCAR he served as president of the International Commission on Atmospheric Chemistry and Radioactivity within the International Association of Meteorology and Atmospheric Sciences. He was also a of the American Association for the Advancement of Science and a member of numerous other scientific societies.

He served as an expert witness during hearings before the U.S. Congress and United Nations on radioactive fallout. He also spearheaded the cleanup of plutonium contamination in the soil surrounding the Rocky Flats nuclear weapons manufacturing facility located outside of Boulder, after measuring levels of radioactivity surrounding the site. He also supported the Southern Poverty Law Center which represented the victims of government-sponsored radiation testing on low-income black citizens.

== Personal life ==
Martell married Marian Elizabeth Marks. He had four children.
