= Howe truss =

Type of truss

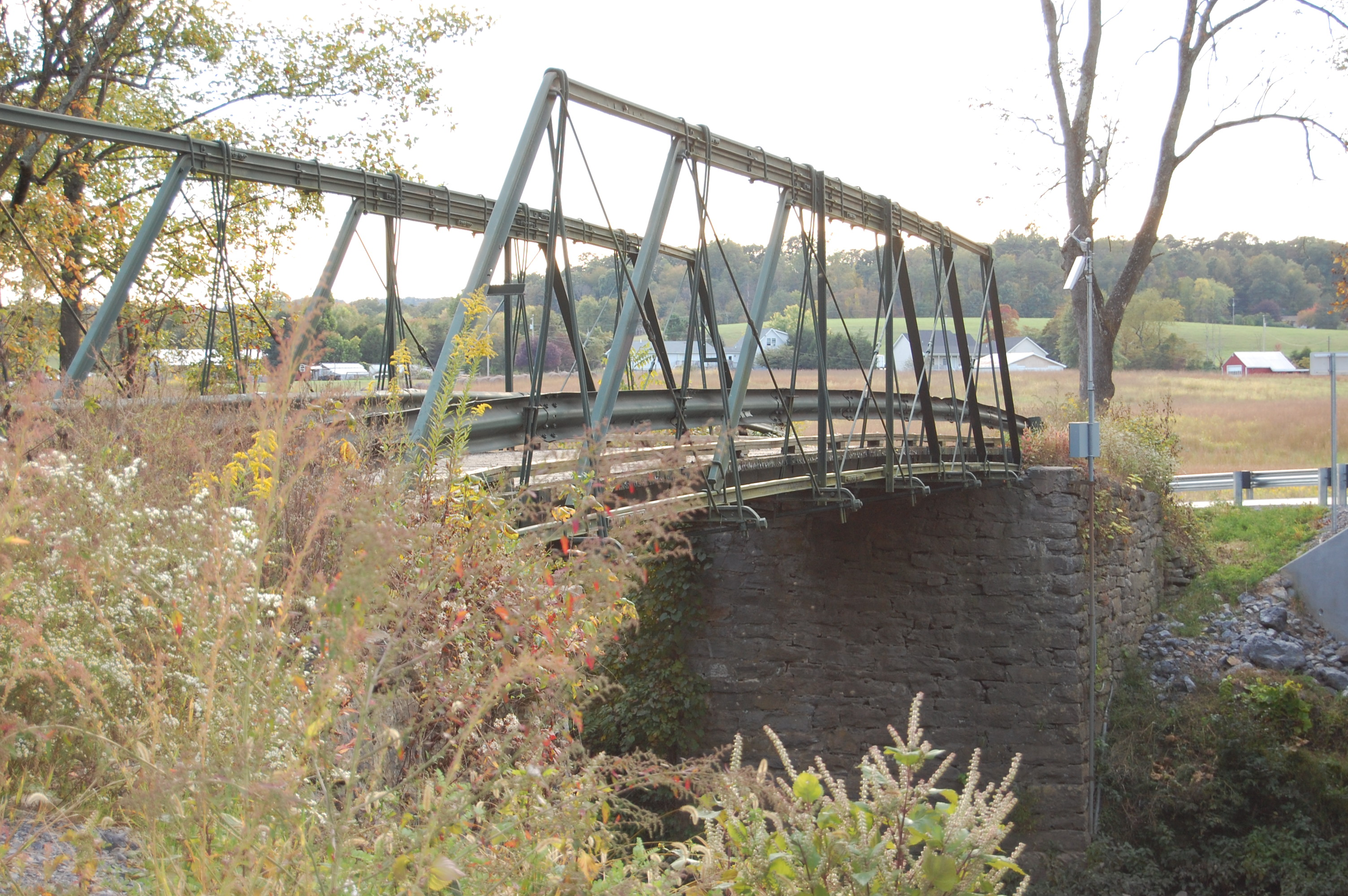
- The Park's Gap Bridge, Berkeley County, West Virginia,
- Span range: Short to medium
- Material: Timber, iron, steel
- Movable: No
- Design effort: Low
- Falsework required: Yes

A Howe truss is a truss bridge consisting of chords, verticals, and diagonals whose vertical members are in tension and whose diagonal members are in compression. The Howe truss was invented by William Howe in 1840, and was widely used as a bridge in the mid to late 1800s.

== Development ==
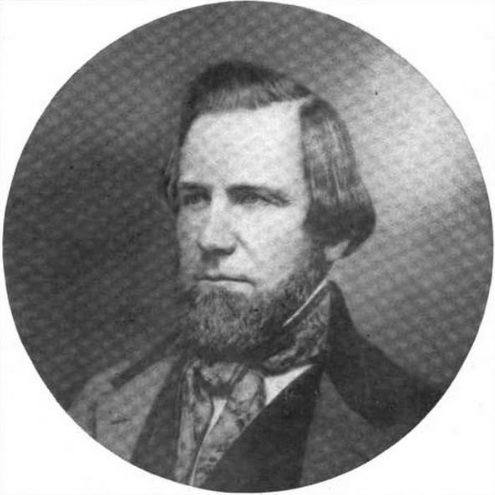
William Howe

The earliest bridges in North America were made of wood, which was abundant and cheaper than stone or masonry. Early wooden bridges were usually of the Towne lattice truss or Burr truss design. Some later bridges were McCallum trusses (a modification of the Burr truss). About 1840, iron rods were added to wooden bridges. The Pratt truss used wooden vertical members in compression with diagonal iron braces. The Howe truss used iron vertical rods in tension with wooden diagonal braces. Both trusses used counter-bracing, which was becoming essential with heavy railroad trains were using bridges.

In 1830, Stephen Harriman Long received a patent for an all-wood parallel-chord truss bridge. Long's bridge contained diagonal braces which were prestressed with wedges. The Long truss did not require a connection between the diagonal and the truss, and was able to remain in compression even when the wood shrank somewhat.

William Howe was a construction contractor in Massachusetts when he patented the Howe truss design in 1840. That same year, he established the Howe Bridge Works to build bridges using his design. The first Howe truss was a single-lane, 75-foot-long (23 m) bridge in Connecticut carrying a road. The second was a railroad bridge over the Connecticut River in Springfield, Massachusetts. This bridge, which drew extensive praise and attention, had seven spans and was 180 feet (55 m) in length. Both bridges were erected in 1840. One of Howe's workmen, Amasa Stone, purchased for $40,000 ($1,290,000 in 2025 dollars) in 1842 the rights to Howe's patented bridge design. With his financial backer, Azariah Boody, Stone formed the bridge-building firm of Boody, Stone & Co., which erected a large number of Howe truss bridges throughout New England. Howe made additional improvements to his bridge, and patented a second Howe truss design in 1846.

== Bridge design ==
Elements of a Howe truss bridge

The Howe truss bridge consists of an upper and lower chord, (Note: The chords are the main part of the truss, and must resist sagging.) each chord consisting of two parallel beams and each chord parallel to one another. The web (Note: The web are those members connecting the chords.) consists of verticals, braces, and counter-braces. Vertical posts connect the upper and lower chords to one another, and create panels. A diagonal brace in each panel strengthens the bridge, and a diagonal counter-brace in each panel enhances this strength. Howe truss bridges may be all wood, a combination of wood and iron, or all iron. Whichever design is used, wooden timbers should have square ends without mortises and tenons. The design of an all-metal Howe truss follows that of the wooden truss.

== The truss ==
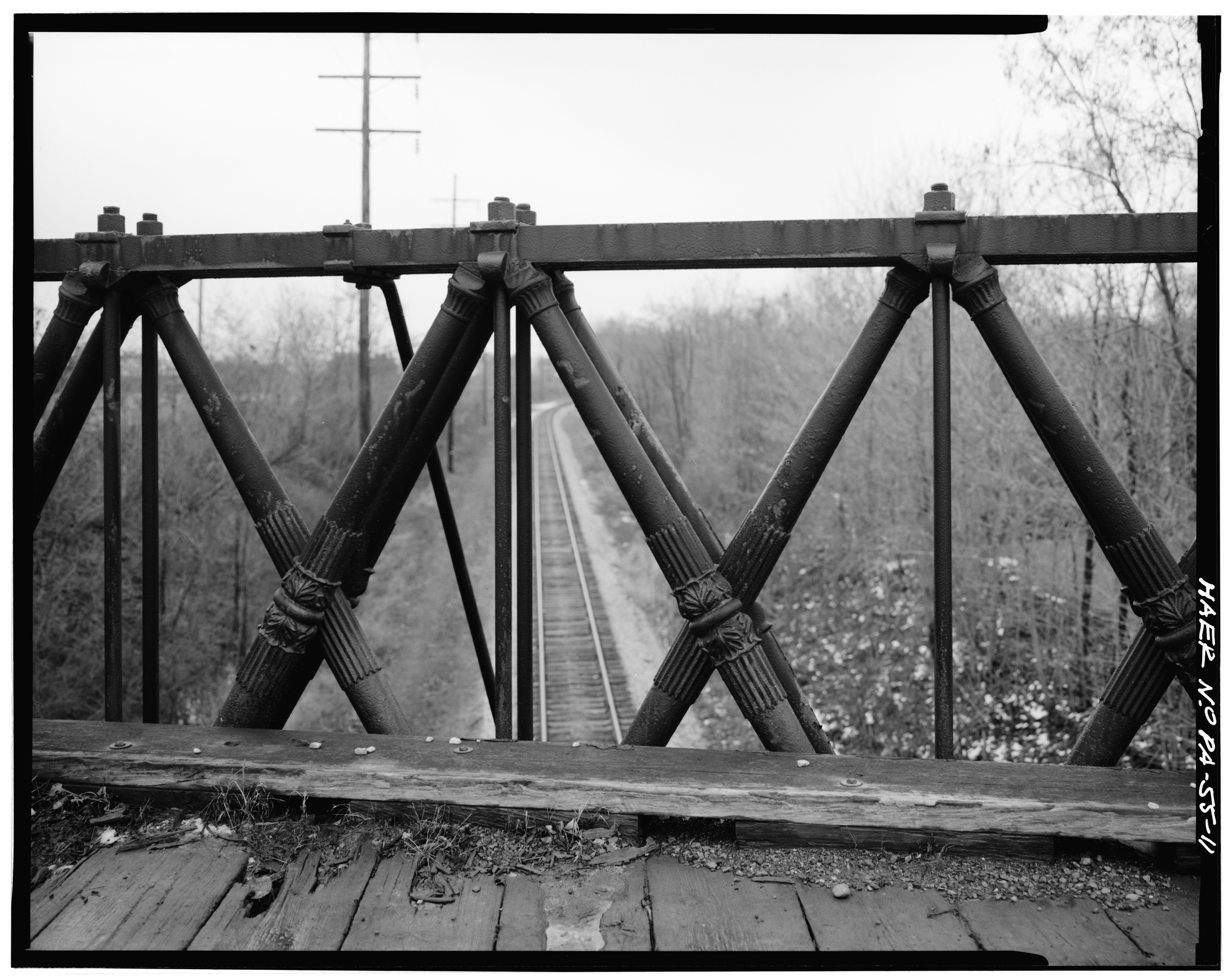
Truss of the Reading-Halls Station Bridge, with cast-iron diagonal elements in compression and narrow wrought-iron vertical ties in tension

The parallels in each chord are usually built up out of smaller beams, each small beam fastened to one another to create a continuous beam. In wooden Howe trusses, these slender beams are usually no more than 10 to 15 inches (250 to 380 mm) wide and 6 to 8 inches (150 to 200 mm) deep. In iron trusses, the upper chord beams are the same length as the panel. Upper chord beams are usually made of cast iron, while the lower chord beams are of wrought iron. A minimum of three small beams are used, each uniform in width and depth. Fishplates are usually used to splice beams together. (Lower chord beams may have eyes on each end, in which case they are fastened together with bolts, pins, or rivets.) In wooden trusses, cotters and iron bolts are used every 4 feet (1.2 m) to connect the beams of the upper chord to one another. (Note: According to the industry publication Engineering News in 1879, a channel 0.5 inches (13 mm) deep is cut into the beams, and then a 2-inch (51 mm) wide cotter pin inserted into the channel and tightened.) In the lower chord of a wooden bridge, clamps are used to couple beams together.

Although generally of the same length, beams are positioned so that a splice (the point where the end of two beams meet) is near the point where two panels meet but not adjacent to the splice in an adjacent pair of beams.

The individual small beams which make up a parallel in a chord are separated along their long side by a space equal to the diameter of the vertical posts, usually about 1 inch (25 mm). This allows the vertical posts to pass through the parallel in the chord. Batten plates (Note: Batten plates are simple pieces of iron or steel plate normally used to splice two pieces together, or attached to the flanges of I-beams or C-beams to stiffen them.) are placed diagonally between the members of a chord, and nailed in place to reduce bending and to act as a shim to provide ventilation between chord members.

The middle third of the lower chord is always reinforced by one or more beams bolted to the chord. This reinforcement is generally one-sixth the width of the cross-section of the lower chord. If a wood chord needs to be strengthened even more, additional slender beams may be bolted to the middle third of the each side of the lower chord. When construction is complete, the upper chord of a Howe truss bridge will be in compression, while the lower chord is in tension.

=== The web ===
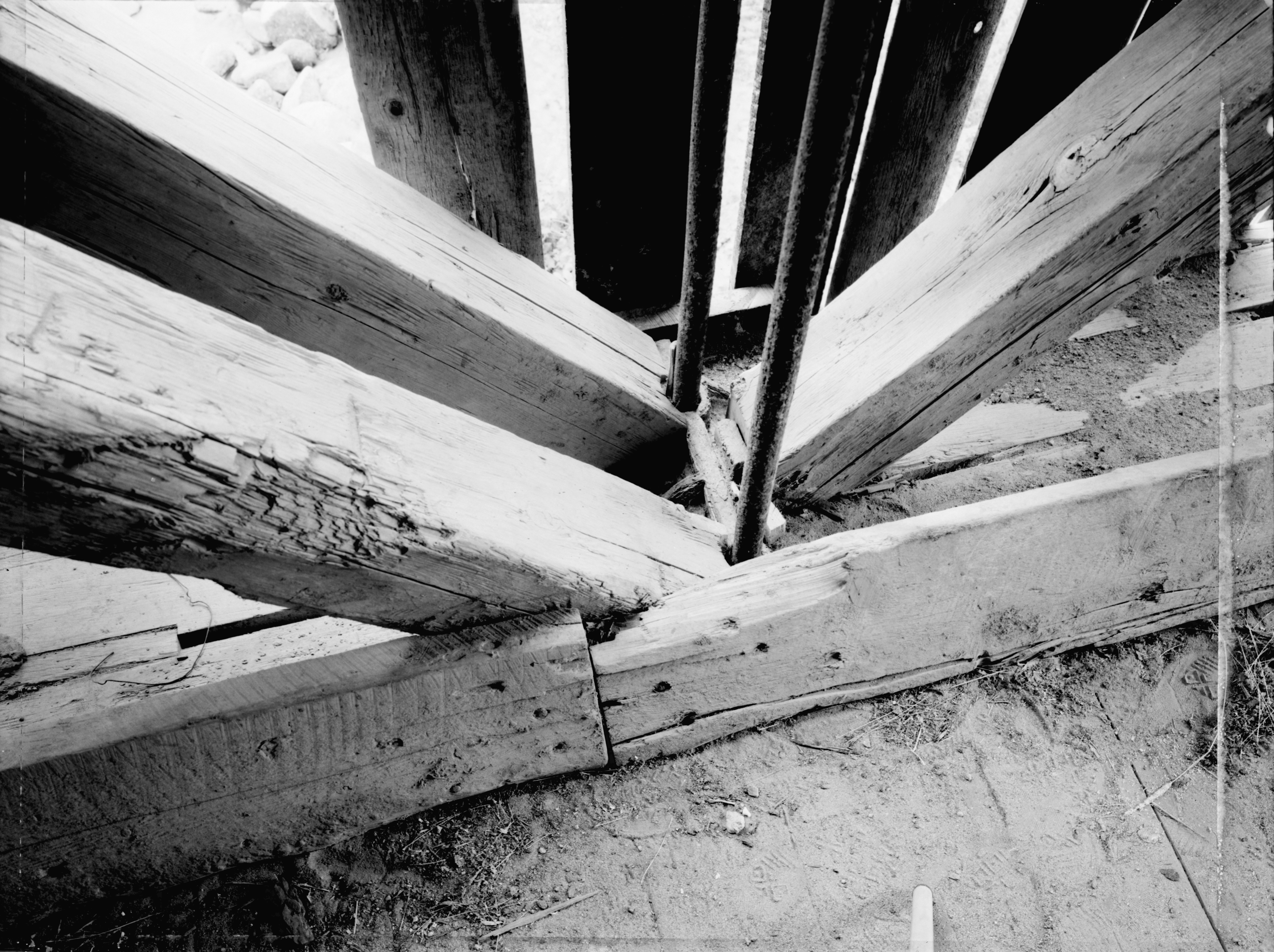
Vertical posts pass through diagonal braces and an angle block to reach the lower chord of the Jay Bridge in Essex County, New York

Vertical posts connect the upper and lower chords, and divide the truss into panels. The Howe truss usually uses iron or steel verticals. These are straight and round, slightly reduced in circumference at the ends, and a screw thread added. The vertical usually passes through the center of the angle block and then through space left in the upper and lower chord. A nut is used to secure the vertical post to the chord. Special plates or washers of wood or metal are used to help distribute the stress induced by the vertical post onto the chords. (Note: In cases where the beams of the lower chord have eyes on the ends and a bolt or rivet is used to connect the beams, the end of the vertical post may be a hook rather than a thread, and pass around the bolt or rivet.) Vertical posts are in tension, which is induced by tightening the nuts on the vertical bars.

Braces are diagonal beams which connect the bottom of a vertical post to the top of the next vertical post. They are placed in the same plane as the chord. Unlike iron or steel braces which are built up, wooden braces are cut to length. Where the parallel in a chord has a thickness of x number of beams, each brace should have a thickness of x – 1 beams. (Note: For example, if a chord parallel is made of four beams, the diagonal should be made of three beams.) The depth-to-width ratio of each member of a diagonal brace should be no greater than that of the brace as a whole. Braces may be a single piece, or several pieces spliced together with fishplate. Braces are in compression due to the tightening of the nuts on the verticals.

Counter-braces are diagonal beams which connect the bottom of a vertical post to the top of the next vertical post, and run roughly perpendicular to braces. They are placed in the same plane as the chord, are generally uniform in size, and should have a thickness one beam less than a brace. Unlike braces, counter-braces are a single piece. Generally speaking, a bridge of six panels or less (about 75 feet (23 m) long) needs no counter-bracing. An eight-panel truss requires counter-braces in every panel but the end panels, and these should be at least one-fourth as strong as the braces. A 10-panel truss requires counter-braces in every panel but the end panels, and these should be at least one-half as strong as the braces. A Howe truss bridge can be strengthened to achieve a live load to dead load ratio of 2-to-1. If this ratio is 2-to-1 or greater, then a six-panel truss must have counter-braces and these must at least one-third as strong as the braces. The counter-braces in an eight-panel truss must be at least two-thirds as strong as the braces, and the counter-braces in a 10-panel truss must be at least equal in strength to the braces. If rapidly moving live loads of any ratio are expected on the Howe truss, then the counter-braces used in the center panel should be equal in strength to the braces, and the panel next to the end panel should have counter-braces at least one-half as strong as the braces.

Where diagonal braces and counter-braces meet, they are usually bolted together.

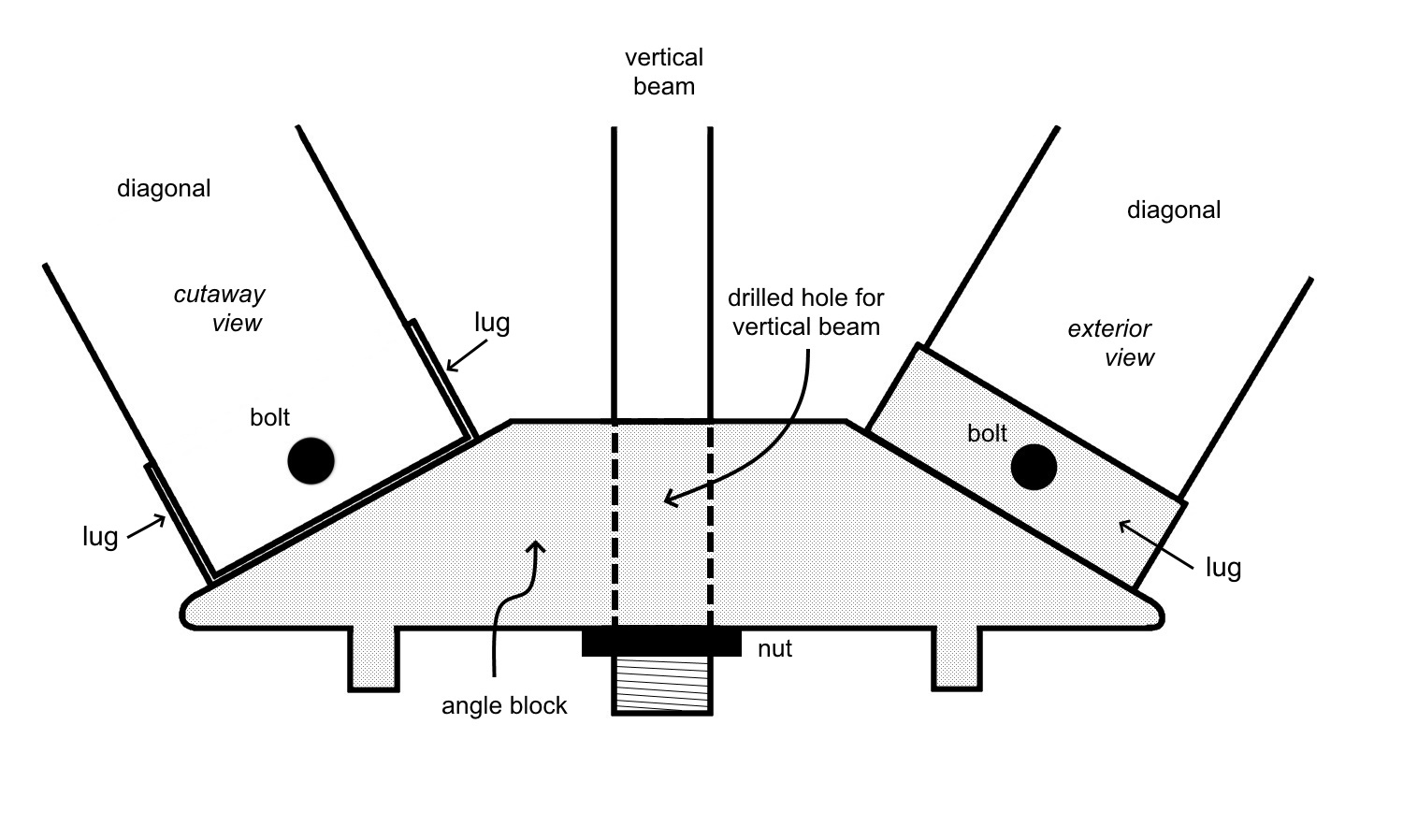
One type of angle block for use in a Howe truss bridge

Braces and counter-braces are held in place with angle blocks. Angle blocks are triangular in cross-section and should be the same height and width as the parallel of the chord. Angle blocks may be made of wood or iron, although iron is usually used for permanent structures. Angle blocks are attached upside-down to the upper chord, and right-side-up to the lower chord. Angle blocks have lugs—flanges or projections used for carrying, seating, or supporting something. The ends of the braces and counter-braces should cut or cast to rest squarely against the angle block. The upper lug may be a single flange that fits into a groove cut into the surface of the diagonal, or there may be two to four lugs which form an opening into which the brace and counter-brace are seated. The diagonals are kept in place by tightening the nuts on the vertical posts. Cleats can be nailed to a wooden angle block to help keep braces and counter-braces seated. Alternatively, a hole may be drilled in the lug and brace/counter-brace and a dowel inserted to hold the beam in place. (Note: The Army Corps of Engineers says braces may be slightly loose while seated in the lugs.) Iron angle blocks should have a hole cast in the upper lugs so that a bolt may pass through the lug and brace/counter-brace, securing the braces in place. The lower lugs in an angle block also have holes cast in them, to permit the angle block to be bolted to the chord. Two or more holes are cast through the center of the angle block, to allow the vertical posts to pass through and be anchored on the other side of the chord.

End panels are the four panels on either side of the end of a Howe truss bridge. These should be the same height as the chords, but not more. The upper chord does not extend past the portal (the space formed by the last four vertical posts at either end of the bridge). The end panels need only a brace, connected from the top of the last vertical post to the end of the lower chord.

Struts are used to connect the two parallels of the chords to prevent lateral bending and reduce vibration. Two diagonals, connecting to the top of the vertical posts, are used. One of the diagonals should be a single piece, while the other is framed into the first piece or made of two pieces connected to it. X-braces, (Note: An X-brace is any form of brace in which two diagonals intersect.) usually made of slender metal rods with threaded ends, are installed between vertical posts to help reduce sway. Knee braces, (Note: A knee brace is a short brace diagonally connecting the vertical to an overhead strut.) usually flat bars with eyelets on either end, are used to connect the last strut and last vertical posts on both ends of the bridge.

Individual panels may be prefabricated off-site. When panels are connected to one another on-site, shims are used to pack any spaces and bolted in place. (Note: Howe trusses are easy to prestress. This means that the panels do not need a full attachment with one another, as compression forces reduce the need to counteract tension forces.)

=== The deck ===
Floor beams extend between the parallels of a chord and are used to support the stringers and decking. Floor beams may sit atop the chord below them, or they may be hung from the vertical posts. Floor beams generally have the greatest depth of any beam in the bridge. Floor beams are usually placed where two panels meet. If they are placed somewhere mid-panel, the chord must be reinforced to resist bending, buckling, and shear stress.

Stringers are beams set on top of the floor beams, parallel to the chords. A stringer may have a depth-to-width ratio anywhere from 2-to-1 to 6-to-1. A ratio greater than 6-to-1 is avoided in order to avoid buckling. In practice, most wood stringers are 16 inches (410 mm) in width due to limitations in milling. There are usually six stringers in a bridge.

Building the deck for a railroad bridge requires that a stringer lie directly beneath each rail, and that a stringer support each end of the railroad ties. Ties are usually 6 by 8 inches (150 by 200 mm) in cross-section, and 9 to 12 feet (2.7 to 3.7 m) in length. They are set directly on top of the stringers, about 12 inches (300 mm) apart. Guard rails 6 by 8 inches (150 by 200 mm) in cross-section are set 20 inches (510 mm) from the center of the ties, and bolted to every third tie.

== Physics of a Howe truss bridge ==
The inner truss of a Howe truss is statically indeterminate. There are two paths for stress during loading, a pair of diagonals in compression and a pair in tension. This gives the Howe truss a level of redundancy which allows it to withstand excessive loading (such as the loss of a panel due to collision).

Prestressing is critical to the proper function of a Howe truss. During its initial construction, the diagonals are connected only loosely to the joints, and rely on prestressing, done at a later stage, to perform correctly. Moreover, diagonals in tension can only withstand stress below the prestressing level. (The size of the member does not matter due to the loose fitting of the diagonal to the joint.) Proper prestressing during construction is therefore critical in the correct performance of the bridge.

Maximum stress is placed on the center of the chords when a live load reaches the center of the bridge, or when the live load extends the length of the bridge. Both the vertical posts and braces at the end of the bridge suffer the highest amount of stress.

The stress affecting counter-braces depends on the ratio of live load to dead load per unit of length, and how the live load is distributed across the bridge. A uniform distribution of live load will put no stress on the counter-braces, while putting live load on only a portion of the bridge will create maximum stress on the center counter-braces.

Because of the stress placed on the bridge, the Howe truss is suitable for spans 150 feet (46 m) in length or less. No provision is made in a Howe truss for expansion or contraction due to changes in temperature.

== Howe truss bridges in use ==
The Howe truss was highly economical due to its ease of construction. The wooden pieces can be designed using little but a steel square and scratch awl, and the truss can be framed using only an adze, auger, and saw. Panels could be prefabricated and transported to the construction site, and sometimes even entire trusses could be manufactured and assembled off-site and transported by rail to the intended location. Some sort of falsework, usually in the form of a trestle, is required to erect the bridge.

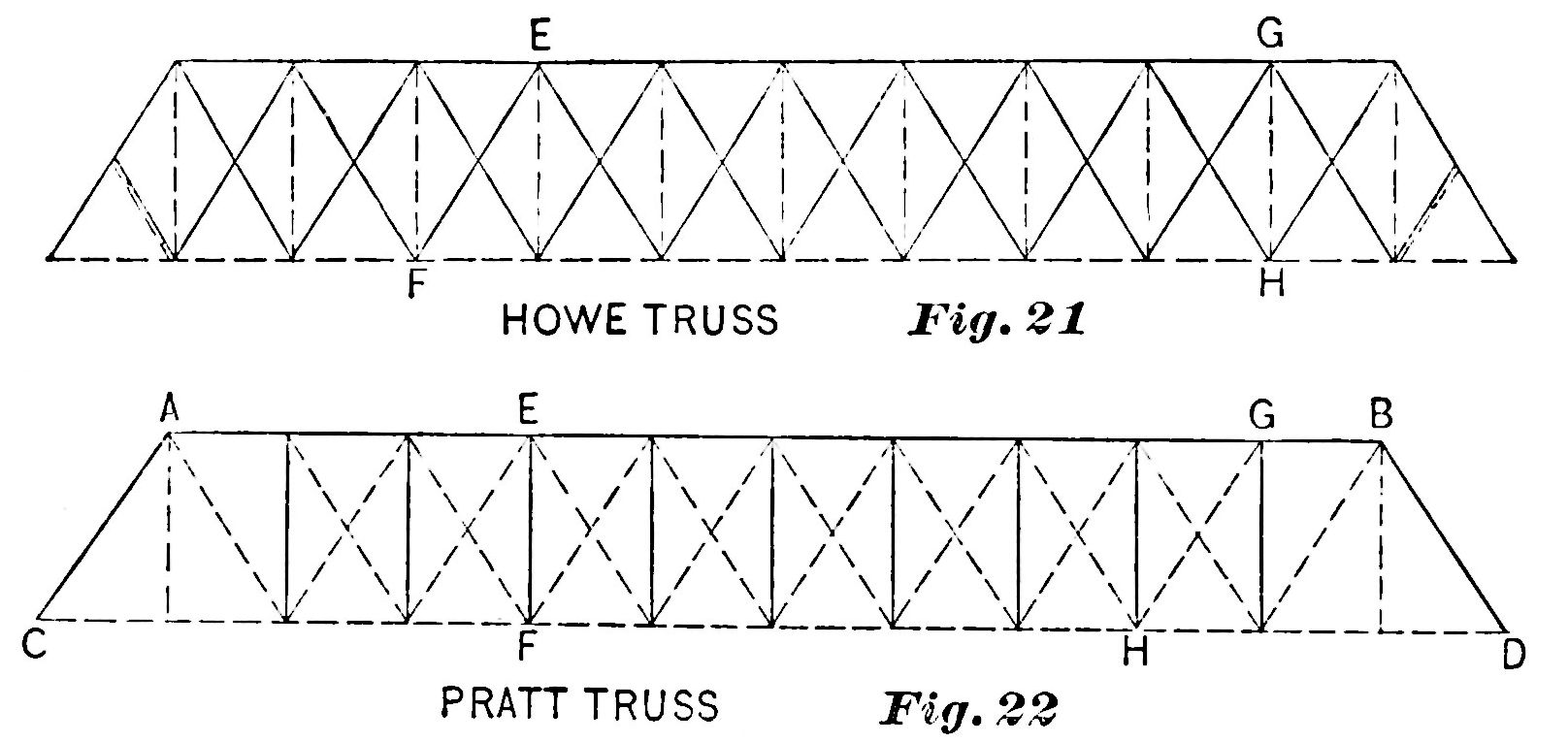
Comparison of the Howe and Pratt truss bridge designs.

The development of the Pratt and Howe trusses spurred the construction of iron bridges in the United States. Until 1850, few iron bridges in the country were longer than 50 feet (15 m). The simple design, ease of manufacture, and ease of construction of the Pratt and Howe trusses spurred Benjamin Henry Latrobe II, chief engineer of the Baltimore and Ohio Railroad, to build large numbers of iron bridges. After two famous iron bridge collapses (one in the United States, the other in the United Kingdom), few of these were built in the North. This meant most iron bridges erected prior to the American Civil War were located in the South. About 1867, a surge in iron bridge building occurred throughout the United States. The most commonly used designs were the Howe truss, Pratt truss, Bollman truss, Fink truss, and Warren truss. (Note: The Warren truss was developed in 1848, the Bollman truss in 1852, and the Fink truss in 1854.) The Howe and Pratt trusses found favor because they used far fewer members. The wooden covered bridge at Bridgeport Stage Park, California, uses a Burr arch in combination with the Howe truss to achieve a 210-foot (64 m) span. Built in 1962, it is the world's longest single-span covered wooden bridge.

The only maintenance a Howe truss requires is adjustment of the nuts on the vertical posts to equalize strain. The diagonals in a wooden Pratt truss proved difficult to keep in proper adjustment, so the Howe truss became the preferred design for a wooden bridge or for a "transitional" bridge of wood with iron verticals. Engineering professor Horace R. Thayer, writing in 1913, considered the Howe truss to be the best form of wooden truss bridge, and believed it to be the most commonly used truss bridge in the United States at that time.

All-iron Howe trusses began to be built about 1845. Examples include a 50-foot-long (15 m) iron Howe truss was built for the Boston and Providence Railroad and a 30-foot-long (9.1 m) railroad bridge over the Ohio and Erie Canal in Cleveland.

Iron, however, was the preferred bridge for automobile and railroads, and the Howe truss did not adapt well to all-iron construction. The Pratt truss's single diagonal bracing system meant less cost, and its ability to use wrought-iron stringers under railroad rails and ties, led bridge builders to favor the Pratt over the Howe. (Note: Later, the Pratt truss was improved with a double-web system. These versions are usually called Linville, Murphy, or Whipple trusses.) Heavier live loads, particularly by railroads, led bridge builders to favor plate girder and Towne lattice bridges for spans less than 60 feet (18 m), and Warren girder bridges for all other spans.

== Use in architecture ==
Trusses have been widely used in architecture since ancient times. The Howe truss is widely used in wood buildings, particularly in providing roof support.

== See also ==
- White Mountain Central Railroad, a heritage railroad in New Hampshire with what "appears to be the only Howe railroad bridge left in the world" (although the active Amtrak Susquehanna River Bridge is also described as a "Howe deck truss" bridge).

== Bibliography ==
- Åkesson, Björn (2008). Understanding Bridge Collapses. London: Taylor & Francis. ISBN 9780415436236.
- Ambrose, James E. (1994). Design of Building Trusses. New York: John Wiley. ISBN 9780471558422.
- Army Corps of Engineers (1917). Engineer Field Manual. Parts I—VII. Professional Papers of the Corps of Engineers, U.S. Army. No. 29. 5th rev. ed. Washington, D.C.: U.S. Department of War.
- Berlow, Lawrence (1998). Reference Guide to Famous Engineering Landmarks of the World: Bridges, Tunnels, Dams, Roads, and Other Structures. Chicago: The Oryx Press. ISBN 9780897749664.
- "Bridge Superstructure". Engineering News. June 28, 1879. pp. 204–206.
- Brockmann, R. John (2005). Twisted Rails, Sunken Ships: The Rhetoric of Nineteenth Century Steamboat and Railroad Accident Investigation Reports, 1833-1879. Amityville, N.Y.: Baywood Publishing Co. ISBN 9780895032911.
- Gasparini, Dario A.; Fields, Melissa (May 1993). "Collapse of Ashtabula Bridge on December 29, 1876". Journal of Performance of Constructed Facilities. 7 (2): 109–125. doi:10.1061/(ASCE)0887-3828(1993)7:2(109). ISSN 0887-3828.
- Haddad, Gladys (2007). Flora Stone Mather: Daughter of Cleveland's Euclid Avenue and Ohio's Western Reserve. Kent, Ohio: Kent State University Press. ISBN 978-0-87338-899-3.
- Johnson, Crisfield (1879). History of Cuyahoga County, Ohio: With Portraits and Biographical Sketches of Its Prominent Men and Pioneers. Philadelphia: D.W. Ensign.
- Knoblock, Glenn A. (2012). Historic Iron and Steel Bridges in Maine, New Hampshire and Vermont. Jefferson, N.C.: McFarland & Company. ISBN 9780786448432.
- Kurrer, Karl-Eugen (2018). The History of the Theory of Structures: Searching for Equilibrium. Berlin: Ernst & Sohn. ISBN 9783433032299.
- Merriman, Mansfield; Jacoby, Henry S. (1919). A Text-Book on Roofs and Bridges. Part I: Stresses in Simple Trusses. 6th ed. New York: John Wiley & Sons.
- Thayer, Horace R. (1913). Structural Design. Volume I: Elements of Structural Design. 2d ed., rev. New York: D. Van Nostrand Company.
- Waddell, J.A.L. (1916). Bridge Engineering. Volume II. New York: John Wiley & Sons.
