= Frank Bird (baseball) =

American baseball player (1869–1958)

- Catcher
- Born: March 10, 1869; Spencer, Massachusetts, U.S.
- Died: May 20, 1958 (aged 89); Worcester, Massachusetts, U.S.
- Batted: Right Threw: Right

MLB debut
- April 16, 1892, for the St. Louis Browns

Last MLB appearance
- June 10, 1892, for the St. Louis Browns

MLB statistics
- Batting average: .200
- Home runs: 1
- Runs batted in: 1
- Stats at Baseball Reference

Teams
- St. Louis Browns (1892)

Frank Zephrin Bird (March 10, 1869 – May 20, 1958), nicknamed "Dodo", was a 19th-century American Major League Baseball catcher. He played for the St. Louis Browns of the National League in 1892.
