= Seven Mile River (East Brookfield River tributary) =

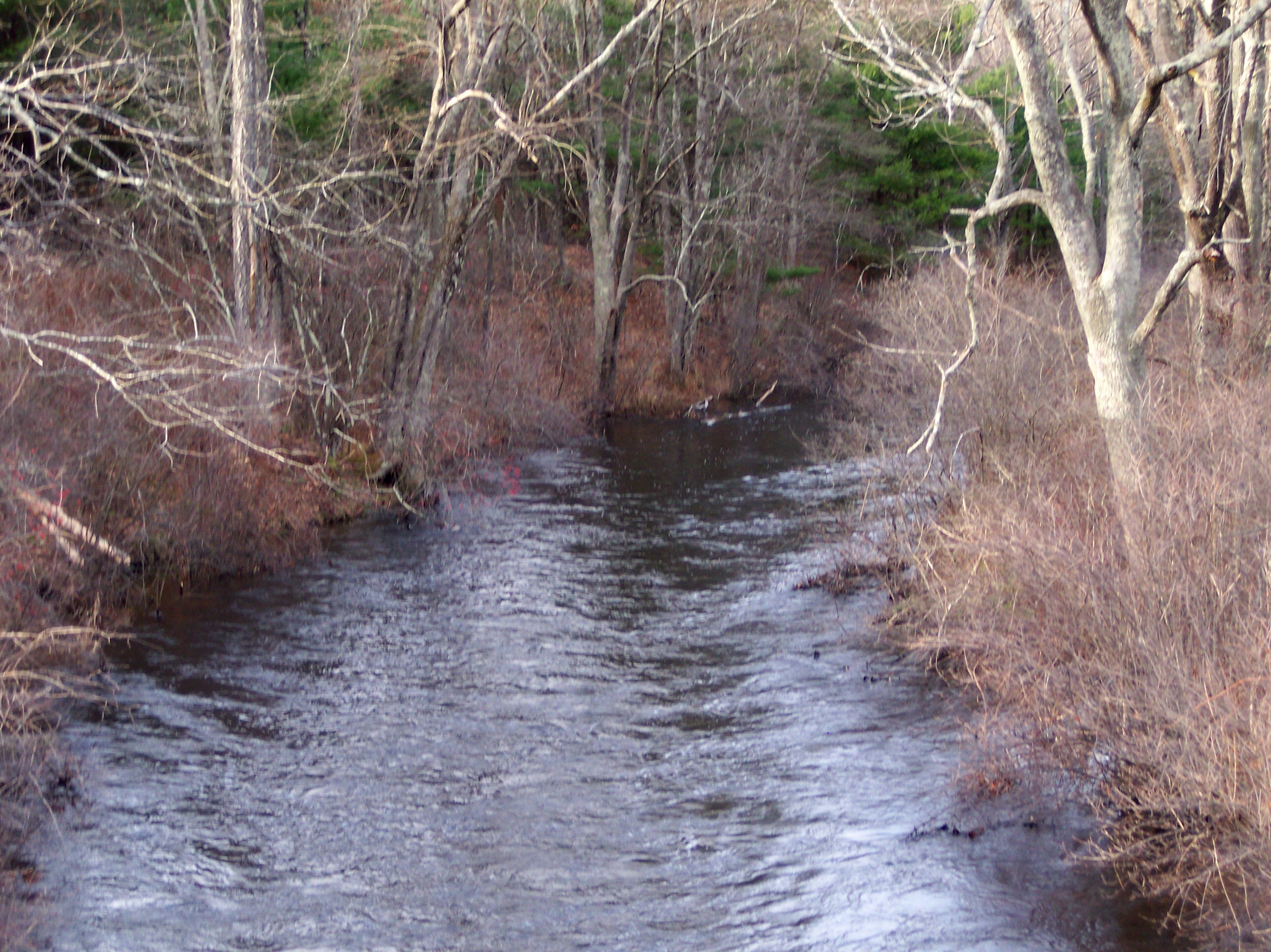
- Seven Mile River near Wire Village

Physical characteristics
- Source
  - location: Browning Pond, Oakham / Spencer
  - coordinates: 42°18′29″N 71°59′49″W
  - elevation: 745 ft (227 m)
- Mouth
  - location: East Brookfield River
  - coordinates: 42°13′08″N 72°03′08″W
  - elevation: 600 ft (180 m)
- Length: 7.8 mi (12.6 km)
- Basin size: 88 mi^{2} (230 km^{2})
- Discharge
  - average: 35 cu ft/s (0.99 m^{3}/s)

The Seven Mile River or Sevenmile River is a 9.6-mile-long (15.4 km) stream in central Massachusetts. It heads at Browning Pond, at the Oakham and Spencer border, and travels south through Spencer, following a short distance from State Route 31 (North Spencer Road). It crosses under Route 31 the highway becomes Pleasant Street, then continues south along Old Meadow Road and under State Route 9 near the junction of State Route 49. It then parallels Route 9 to its south until it joins the East Brookfield River between Lake Lashaway and Quaboag Pond.

== Information ==
The Seven Mile River drains Spencer and surrounding communities. Modern mapping shows it to be nearly ten miles long. Its mouth is at an elevation of about 600 feet (180 m) above sea level, and its head is at about 745 feet (227 m). This 145-foot (44 m) fall was once used to provide waterpower for industry. There exists the remnants of several dams, two of which were taken out during a flood in the 1950s and never repaired. They remain as evidence of a forgone era when Spencer was a major manufacturing center. In addition to small local brooks and streams, the Seven Mile River is fed from Turkey Hill Brook north of town and Cranberry River to the south. This river is part of the Chicopee River Watershed.

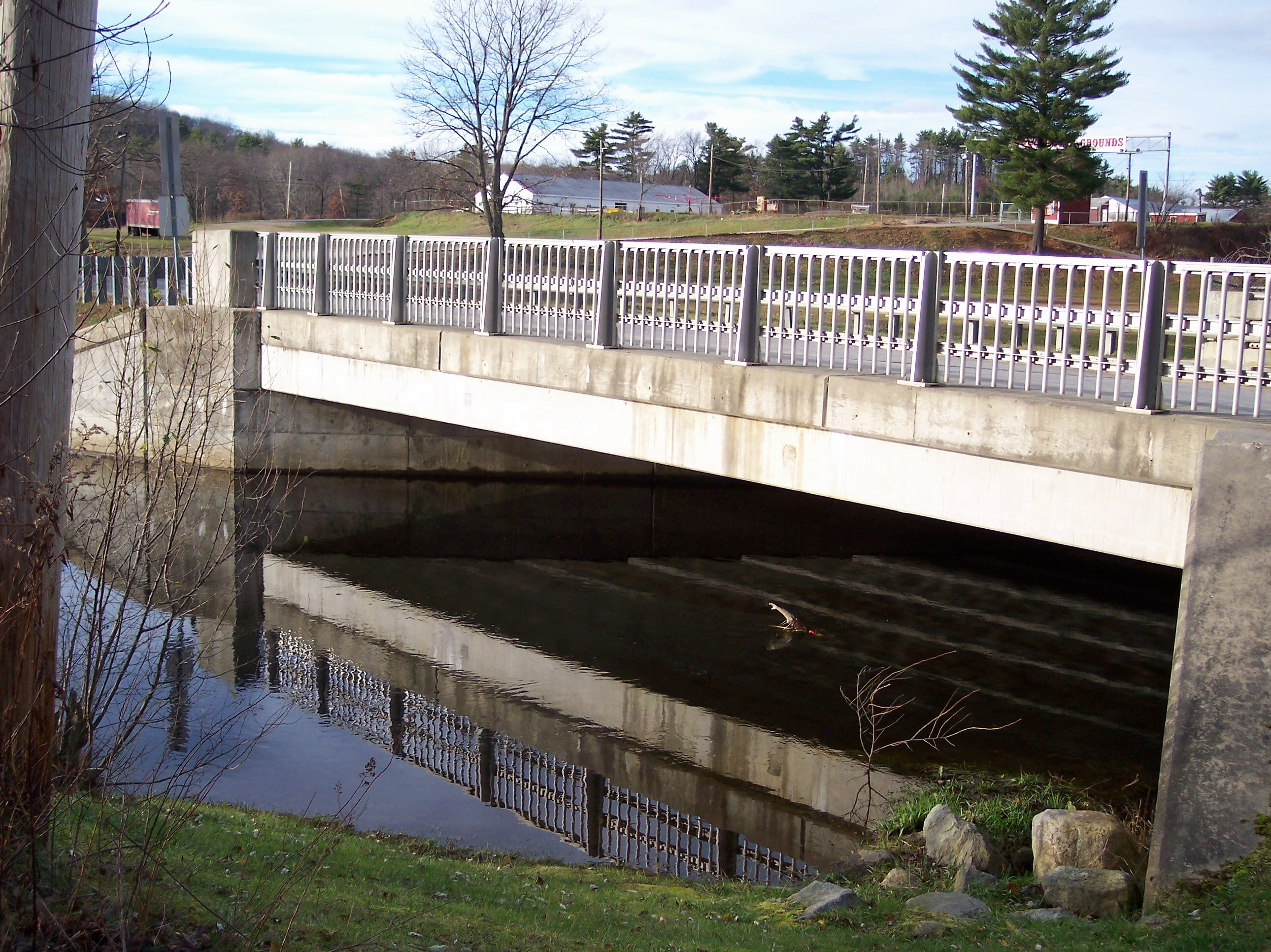
Seven Mile River bridge in Spencer

The seven mile name starts from the length of the river, the bridge is not really 7 miles.

== History ==
In the 1800s, the Seven Mile River furnished waterpower to industry in Spencer. There were many factories along this river. Now a sewage treatment plant stands alone. At the head of Turkey Hill Brook, a major tributary to the Seven Mile River is Sugden Reservoir. The reservoir was part of Spencer's wire drawing industry and fed the Lower Wire Village Mill, which made card wire. This mill originally belonged to the Prouty Brothers. When sold to Richard Sugden, he improved it by building the Sugden Reservoir on the top of Turkey Hill. The new company's name became Wickwire-Spencer. It remained until after World War II.

== See also ==
- Sevenmile River (Tenmile River)
- List of rivers of Massachusetts
