= Elias Howe =

American inventor (1819–1867)

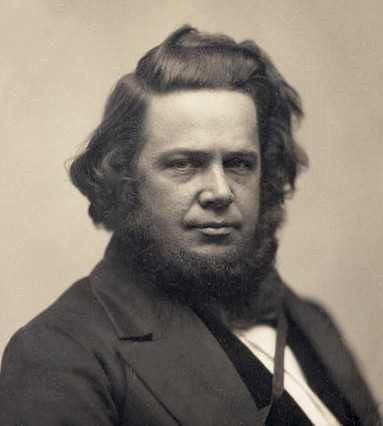
- Born: Elias Howe Jr. July 9, 1819; Spencer, Massachusetts
- Died: October 3, 1867 (aged 48); Brooklyn, New York
- Education: apprenticed as mechanic and machinist
- Spouse(s): Elizabeth Jennings Ames (m. 1841; d. 1850); Rose Halladay (d. 1890)
- Children: Jane Robinson Howe, Simon Ames Howe, Julia Maria Howe
- Parent(s): Elias Howe and Polly (Bemis) Howe
- Engineering career
- Discipline: Mechanical Engineering
- Projects: Sewing machine
- Significant advance: Lockstitch loop method
- Awards: Gold Medal, Paris Exposition of 1867, Légion d'honneur (France)

Elias Howe Jr. (/haʊ/; July 9, 1819 – October 3, 1867) was an American inventor best known for his creation of the modern lockstitch sewing machine.

== Early life ==
Elias Howe Jr. was born on July 9, 1819, to Dr. Elias Howe Sr (1792–1867) and Polly (Bemis) Howe (1791–1871) in Spencer, Massachusetts. Howe spent his childhood and early adult years in Massachusetts, where he apprenticed in a textile factory in Lowell beginning in 1835. After mill closings due to the Panic of 1837, he moved to Cambridge, Massachusetts, to work as a mechanic with carding machinery, apprenticing along with his cousin Nathaniel P. Banks. In the beginning of 1838, he apprenticed in the shop of Ari Davis, a master mechanic in Cambridge who specialized in the manufacture and repair of chronometers and other precision instruments. It was in the employ of Davis that Howe seized upon the idea of the sewing machine.

He married Elizabeth Jennings Ames, daughter of Simon Ames and Jane B. Ames, on March 3, 1841, in Cambridge. They had three children: Jane Robinson Howe (1842–1912), Simon Ames Howe (1844–1883), and Julia Maria Howe (1846–1869). He then married Rose Halladay.

== Invention of sewing machine and career ==
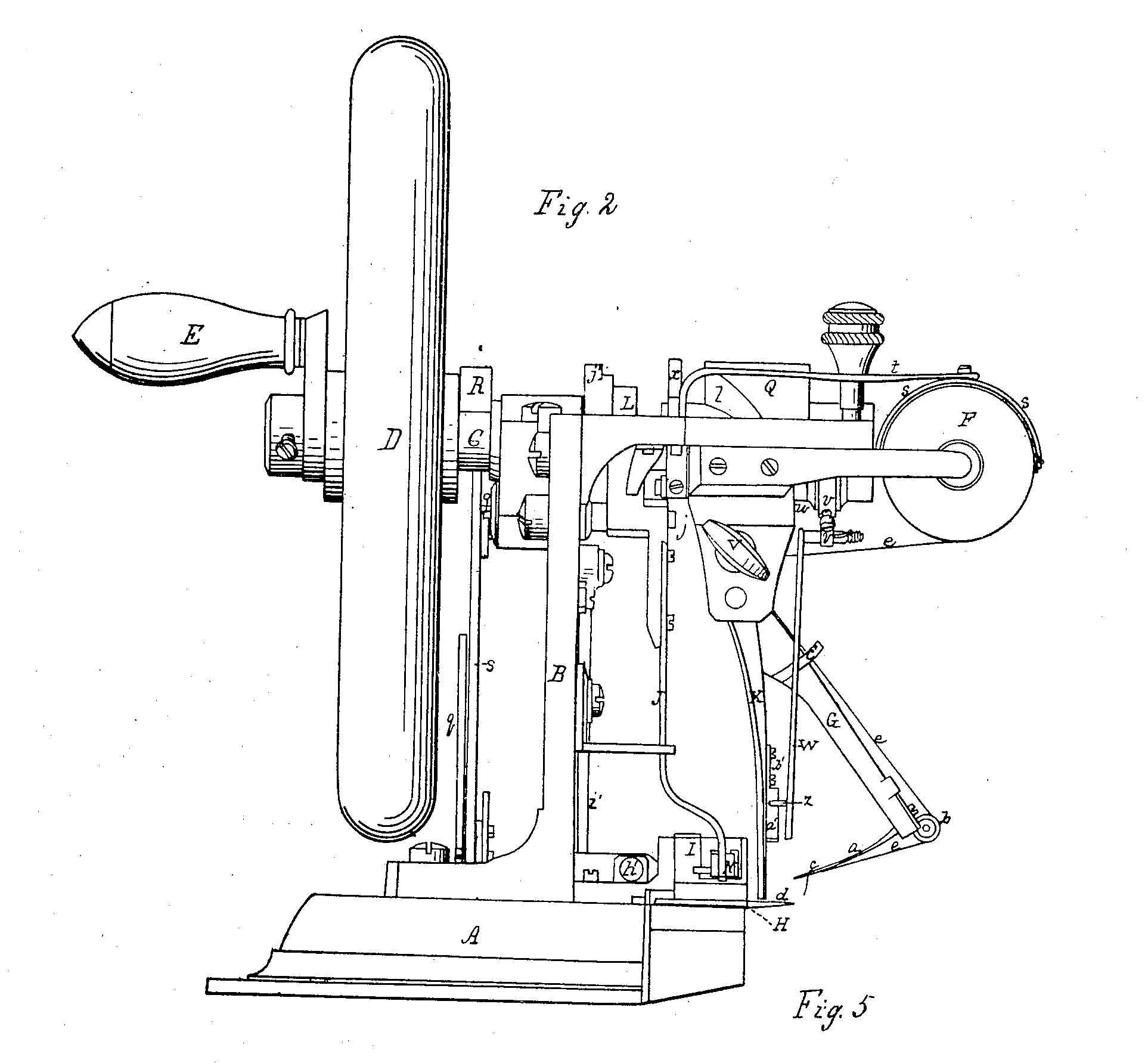
Howe's sewing machine

Howe was not the first to conceive of the idea of a sewing machine. Many other people had formulated the idea of such a machine before him, one as early as 1790, and some had even patented their designs and produced working machines, in one case at least 80 of them. However, Howe originated significant refinements to the design concepts of his predecessors, and on September 10, 1846, he was awarded the first United States patent (U.S. patent 4750) for a sewing machine using a lockstitch design. His machine contained the three essential features common to most modern machines: a needle with the eye at the point, a shuttle operating beneath the cloth to form the lock stitch, and an automatic feed.

Despite securing his patent, Howe had considerable difficulty finding investors in the United States to finance production of his invention, so his elder brother Amasa Bemis Howe traveled to England in October 1846 to seek financing. Amasa was able to sell his first machine for £250 to William Thomas of Cheapside, London, who owned a factory for the manufacture of corsets, umbrellas and valises. Elias and his family joined Amasa in London in 1848, but after business disputes with Thomas and failing health of his wife, Howe returned nearly penniless to the United States. His wife Elizabeth, who preceded Elias back to the United States, died in Cambridge, Massachusetts shortly after his return in 1849.

Despite his efforts to sell his machine, other entrepreneurs began manufacturing sewing machines. Howe was forced to defend his patent in a court case that lasted from 1849 to 1854 because he found that Isaac Singer with cooperation from Walter Hunt had perfected a facsimile of his machine and was selling it with the same lockstitch that Howe had invented and patented. He won the dispute and earned considerable royalties from Singer and others for sales of his invention.

Howe contributed much of the money he earned to providing equipment for the 17th Connecticut Volunteer Infantry of the Union Army during the Civil War, in which Howe served as a private in Company D. Due to his faltering health he performed light duty, often seen walking with the aid of his shillelagh, and took on the position of Regimental Postmaster, serving out his time riding to and from Baltimore with war news. He'd enlisted August 14, 1862, and then mustered out July 19, 1865.

== Involvement in inventing the zipper ==
Howe received a patent in 1851 for an "Automatic, Continuous Clothing Closure". Perhaps because of the success of his sewing machine, he did not try to seriously market it, missing recognition he might otherwise have received.

== Adult life and legacy ==
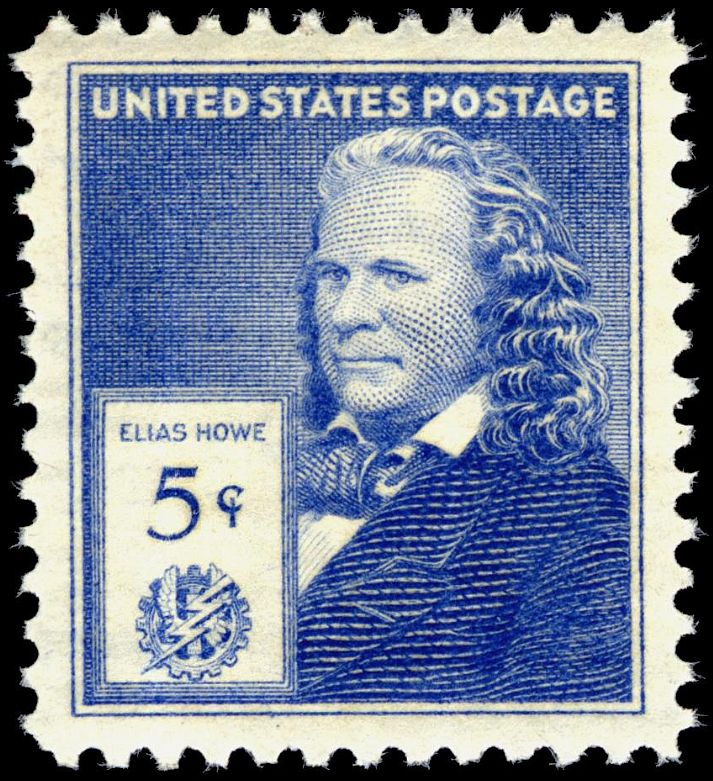
Howe commemorative, 1940 issue

Between 1854 and 1871/72, Elias's older brother, Amasa Bemis Howe (died in 1868), and later his son Benjamin Porter Howe, owned and operated a factory in New York City, producing sewing machines under the name of the Howe Sewing Machine Co., which won a gold medal at the London Exhibition of 1862. Between 1865 and 1867, Elias himself established The Howe Machine Co. in Bridgeport, Connecticut, that was operated by Elias's sons-in-law, the Stockwell Brothers, until about 1886. Elias Howe's sewing machine won a gold medal at the Paris Exhibition of 1867, and that same year he was awarded the Légion d'honneur by Napoleon III for his invention. In 1873, Benjamin P. Howe sold the Howe Sewing Machine Co. factory and name to the Howe Machine Co., which merged the two companies.

Elias Howe died at age 48, on October 3, 1867, of gout and a massive blood clot. He was buried in Green-Wood Cemetery in Brooklyn, New York. His second wife, Rose Halladay, who died on October 10, 1890, is buried with him. Both Singer and Howe were multi-millionaires.

Howe's father died two months later on December 28, 1867, one day after his 75th birthday.

Howe was commemorated with a 5-cent stamp in the Famous American Inventors series issued October 14, 1940.

The 1965 Beatles movie Help! is dedicated to his memory.

In 2004 he was inducted into the United States National Inventors Hall of Fame.

== Genealogy ==
Howe was a descendant of John Howe (1602–1680) who arrived in Massachusetts Bay Colony in 1630 from Brinklow, Warwickshire, England, and settled in Sudbury, Massachusetts. Howe was also a descendant of Edmund Rice, another early immigrant to Massachusetts Bay Colony.

== See also ==
- Daniel Davis Jr.
