= Chirographer =

A chirographer can refer to

- Someone who studies chirography
- a machine patented in 1842 by Charles Thurber which was an early form of typewriter.
- "The officer appointed to 'engross fines' (chirographs), in the Court of Common Pleas (Abolished in 1833.)" ("chirographer, n.", Oxford English Dictionary)
