= Thomas P. Wheelock =

American inventor and gunsmith

- Born: Thomas P. Wheelock; January 1, 1813; Massachusetts, United States
- Died: August 18, 1864 (aged 51); Massachusetts, United States
- Occupation: Inventor
- Relatives: Ethan Allen (brother-in-law)

Thomas P. Wheelock (1813–1864) was an American inventor and gunsmith. Together with his brother-in-law Ethan Allen, they produced several single-action revolvers and rifles in the United States during the mid-19th century.

== Bibliography ==
- Thomas, H.H. (1965). The Story of Allen & Wheelock Firearms ISBN 0-913150-73-8.
