= Five Mile River (East Brookfield River tributary) =

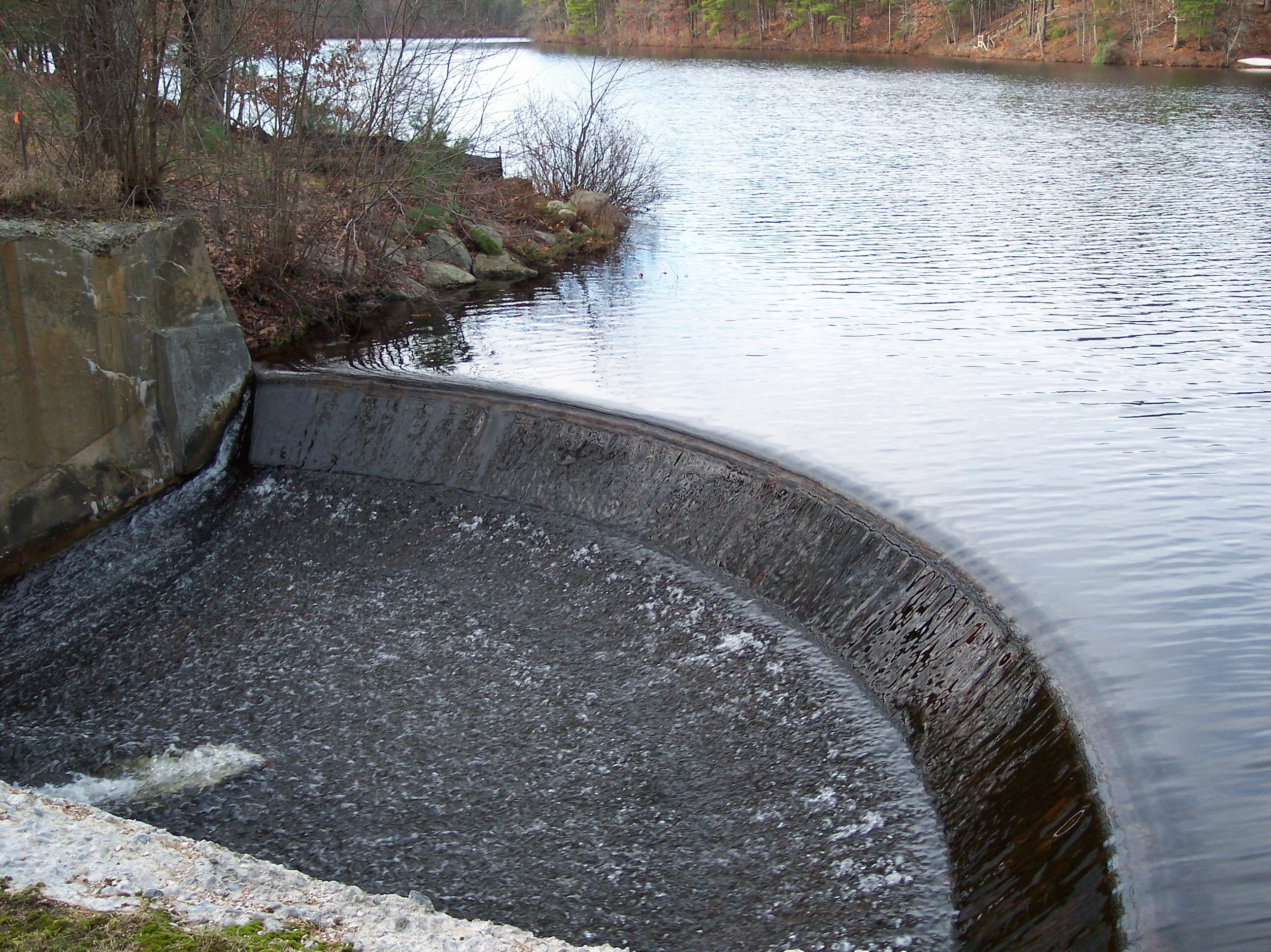
- Five Mile River head at Brooks Pond

Physical characteristics
- Source
  - location: Brooks Pond
- Mouth
  - location: Lake Lashaway
  - elevation: 615 feet (187 m)
- Length: 10.1 mi (16.3 km)
- Basin size: 13.8 mi^{2} (36 km^{2})
- Discharge
  - average: 5.5 cu ft/s (0.16 m^{3}/s)

The Five Mile River (Fivemile River on federal maps) is a 10.1-mile-long (16.3 km) river in central Massachusetts, part of the Chicopee River watershed. It rises north of Dean Pond in the Town of Oakham within Rutland State Forest and flows south through Dean Pond to Brooks Pond, 2.5 miles (4.0 km) northeast of North Brookfield, then continues south to its mouth at the north end of Lake Lashaway, also in North Brookfield.

== Information ==
The Five Mile River is a short river that connects the outflow portion of Brooks Pond located at the boundary between the towns of North Brookfield and Spencer, and Lake Lashaway located downstream in North Brookfield. The river is a tributary, via the East Brookfield River, to the Quaboag River and is part of the Chicopee River Watershed. The Five Mile has been harnessed as a source of power for saw and grist mills and colonial foundry according to historical documentation. The proximity to iron ore, power from Brooks Pond (previously known as Johnson's Pond and North Pond), to power an air-blast bellows, and nearby abundance of wood (for charcoal), made the Five Mile River a good location for blast furnace and iron works operated by Jonathan and Nicholas Jenks in 1782. "Two Gilberts joined the enterprise and still later the venture was split in two--two furnaces, two forges etc.-each family operating one."

The Five Mile River is also fed by the outflow from the Kittredge Dam Reservoir and the Horse Pond Brook Reservoir as well as drainage from the wetlands area extending from Brooks Pond to the north and Lake Lashaway to the south. This watershed is approximately 14 square miles (36 km^{2}) in addition to the Brooks Pond watershed.

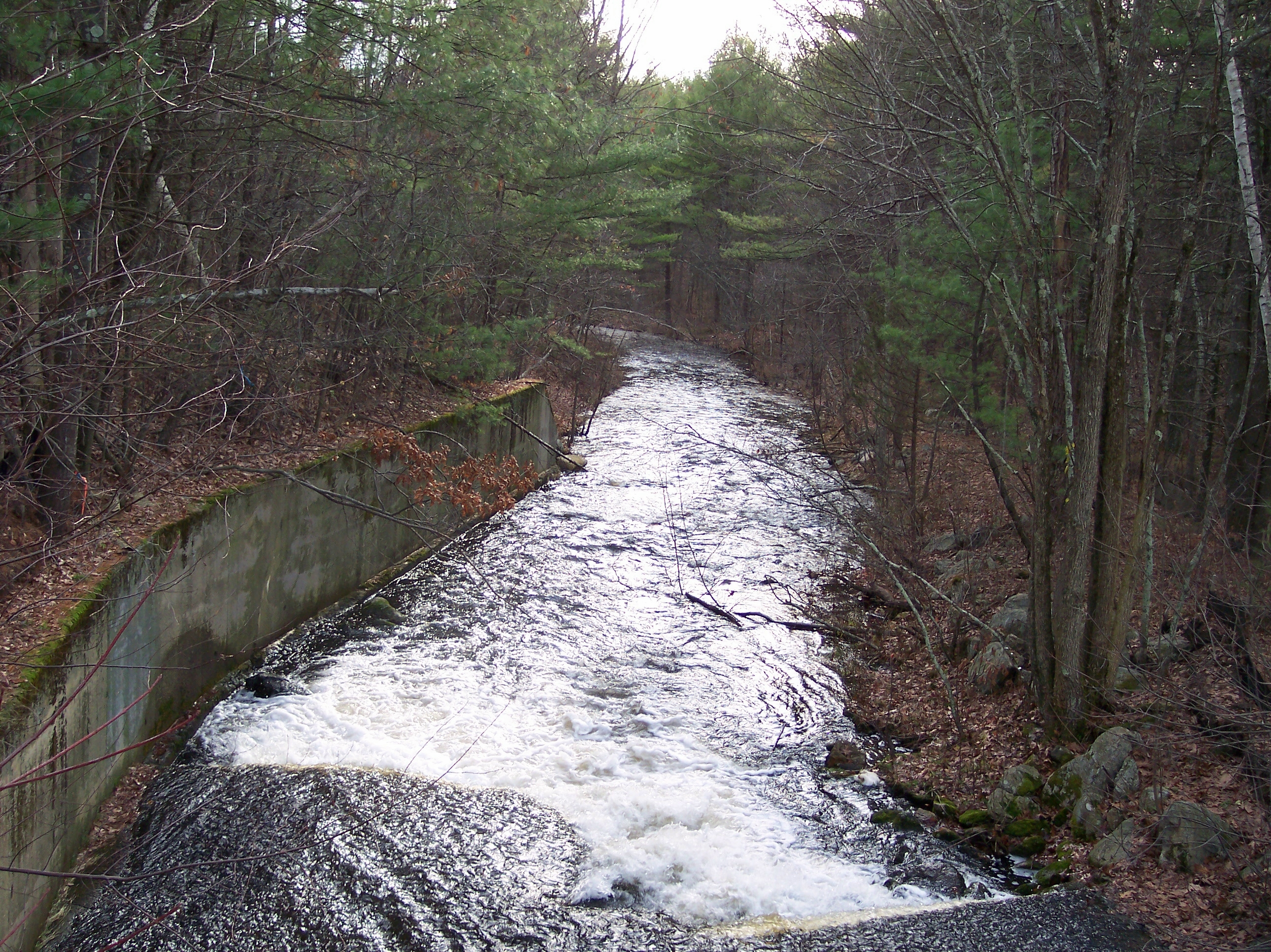
Five Mile River in Spencer

== Coordinates ==
42°21′53″N 72°01′27″W Head
42°14′37″N 72°02′33″W Mouth

== See also ==
- List of rivers of Massachusetts
