= East Brookfield River =

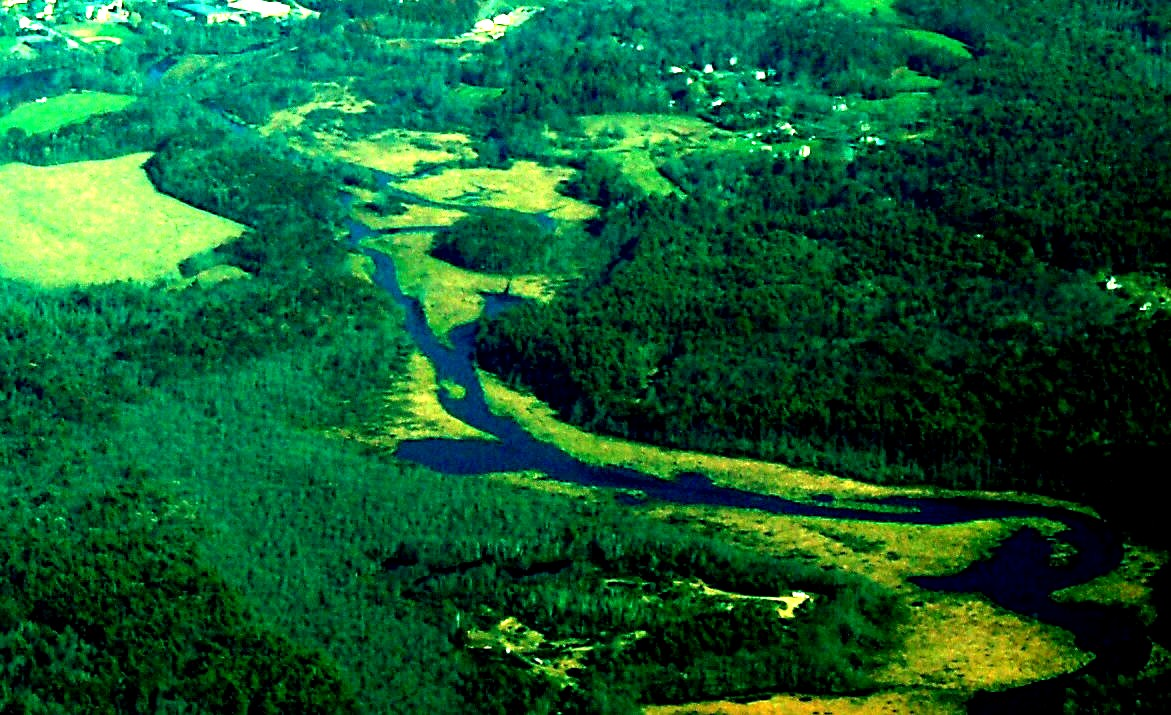
- East Brookfield River at East Brookfield

Physical characteristics
- Source
  - location: Lake Lashaway
  - elevation: 614 feet (187 m)
- Mouth
  - location: Quaboag Pond
  - elevation: 594 feet (181 m)
- Length: 2.4 mi (3.9 km)
- Basin size: 15 mi^{2} (39 km^{2})
- Discharge
  - average: 11.5 cu ft/s (0.33 m^{3}/s)

The East Brookfield River is a 2.4-mile-long (3.9 km) river in Massachusetts that heads at Lake Lashaway in East Brookfield at an elevation of 614 feet (187 m) above sea level. It continues to Quaboag Pond, at an elevation of 594 feet (181 m).

== History ==
This river receives its name from East Brookfield, Massachusetts. Via the Quaboag River, it is part of the Chicopee River Watershed.

== Watershed ==
This river starts at the Lake Lashaway Dam, near State Route 9 and continues through wetlands to Quaboag Pond. Numerous local brooks and streams from the towns of East Brookfield, North Brookfield, and Spencer drain the watershed into Lake Lashaway and the East Brookfield River. About one mile from its mouth at Quaboag Pond, the Seven Mile River joins, draining water from Spencer and surrounding areas.

== Coordinates ==
- 42°13′34″N 72°03′00″W Head at Lake Lashaway Dam
- 42°12′04″N 72°03′27″W Mouth at Quaboag Pond

== See also ==
- List of rivers of Massachusetts
