= Kermit Lee =

American architect and artist

Kermit J. Lee Jr.
- Born: March 27, 1934; Springfield, Massachusetts
- Died: January 16, 2018 (age 84); Syracuse, New York
- Education: Syracuse University, (B.A.) Technische Universität Braunschweig (M.A.)

Kermit James Lee Jr. (1934–2018) was an architect, artist, and professor emeritus at Syracuse University. He was the second black graduate from Syracuse's School of Architecture in 1957. (Wilson, Dreck Spurlock. African American Architects: A Biographical Dictionary 165–1945. New York: Routledge, 2004, pp. 52–56.)

== Early life ==
Lee was born March 27, 1934, in Springfield, Massachusetts to Kermit J. Lee (1909–1991) and Lillian Jackson Lee (1910–2017). His four siblings include, Ronald B. Lee (the first African American Assistant Postmaster-General), William, Judith, and Deborah. Their father, Kermit, was the first black bank teller in Springfield and worked for the Third National Bank of Hampden County and their mother, Lillian, worked in local schools. The family were communicants at St. John's Congregational in the city.

Lee attended Springfield's public schools and graduated from the city's Technical High School in 1951 then attended Syracuse University, graduating magna cum laude in 1957. He earned a graduate degree in Braunschweig, Germany, and practiced in Switzerland before returning to Syracuse in 1968 as a faculty member. He remained on faculty until 1995.

== Career ==
Lee earned a graduate degree in Braunschweig, Germany, and practiced in Switzerland before returning to Syracuse as a faculty member in 1966. From 1957 to 1958, Lee was a lecturer at the Boston Architectural Center. He remained on faculty until 1995. Lee also briefly returned to Springfield in the 1960s to help the city plan a renewal project for the Winchester Square neighbor, adjacent to the home of Kermit Sr., and Lillian Lee.

Lee suffered a stroke in 1994 as a result he had to retire from active teaching and relearn how to draw with his left hand having lost sensations on his right side.

== Personal Life and Death ==
Lee married Lore Leipelt and the couple had two children, Karin (George) and Jason A. Lee. Lee died on January 16, 2018.

== Legacy ==
On October 18, 2018, an exhibition was held in the Marble Room in Slocum Hall to commemorate Lee's death. This initial exhibition included photographs, original drawings and other Lee memorabilia. In 2020 Syracuse hosted “The Living Room Conversation: In Memory of Professor Kermit J. Lee Jr.” exhibition in honor of Lee. The exhibition was concluded with the “Professor Kermit J. Lee Jr. Symposium” and an art show highlight Lee's work following his stroke was also presented.

The Syracuse University Special Collections Research Center houses Lee's architectural papers and drawings from his firm.

Since 1997, Syracuse maintains the "Kermit J. Lee Jr. Endowed Scholarship" in Lee's honor.
