= Quaboag Pond =

Lake in the U.S. state of Massachusetts

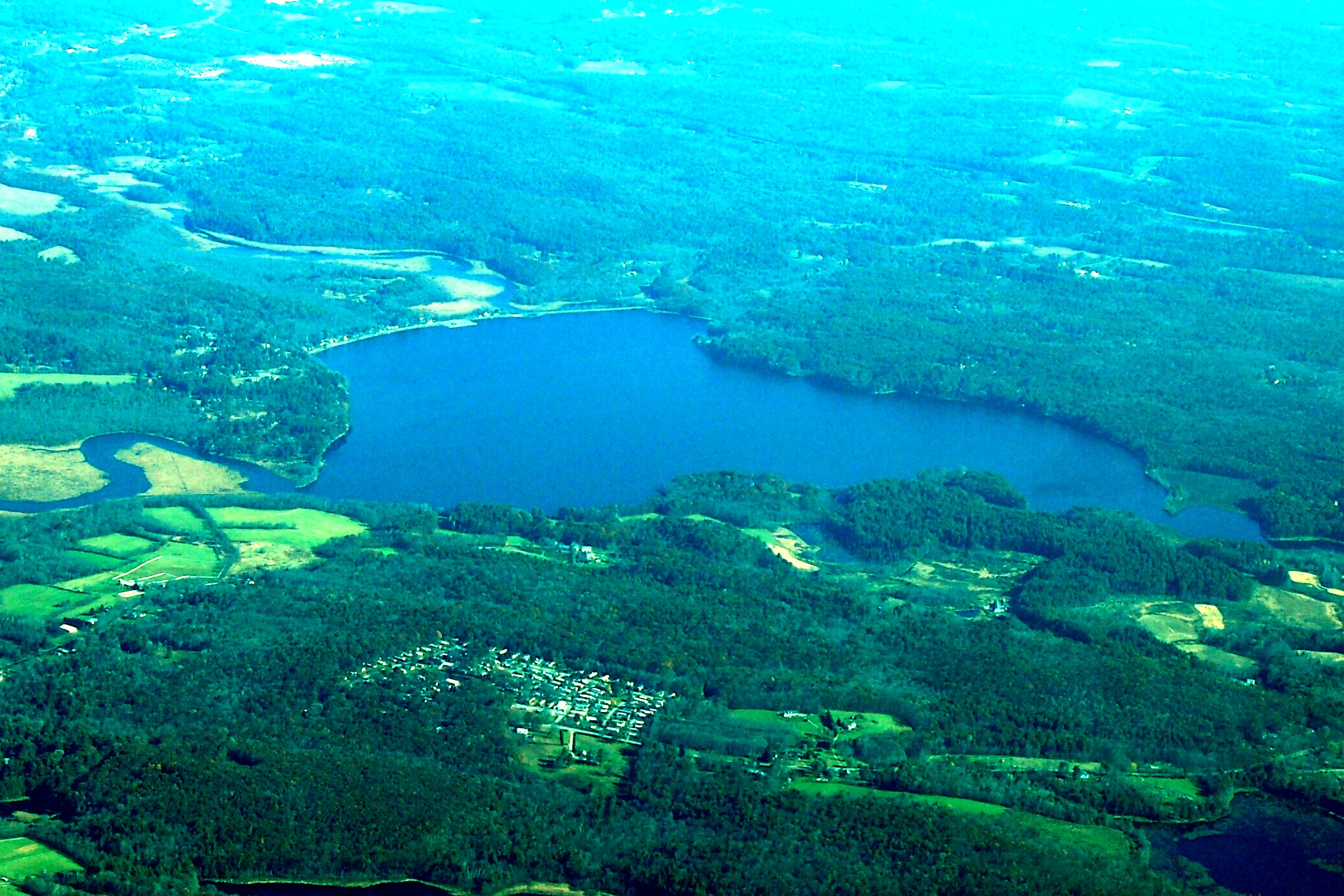

- Location within Massachusetts
- Location: Brookfield / East Brookfield, Massachusetts, United States
- Coordinates: 42°11′14″N 72°04′05″W
- Type: Pond
- Basin countries: United States
- Surface area: 558 acres (226 ha)
- Average depth: 6 ft (1.8 m)
- Max. depth: 15 ft (4.6 m)
- Shore length^{1}: 8.1 mi (13.0 km)
- Surface elevation: 594 ft (181 m)
- Settlements: East Brookfield, Brookfield
- ^{1} Shore length is not a well-defined measure.

Quaboag Pond is a 537-acre (2.17 km^{2}) pond located a couple of miles south of and between East Brookfield and Brookfield, Massachusetts. The pond lies about two miles (3 km) south of state Route 9 as it passes through East Brookfield. Quaboag Pond was once named Podunk Pond.

== Description ==
The lake is 558 acres (226 ha) in size, with an average depth of 6 feet (2 m) and a maximum depth of 15 feet (5 m). The water is brown in color and quite warm in the summertime. Non-native invasive plants cover substantial portions of this pond; the pond lies in a swampy area, also subject to the invasive species.

Local swamps feed Quaboag Pond as well as inflow from the East Brookfield River, a two-mile (3.22 km) long river that heads at the Lake Lashaway Dam, and Quacumquasit Pond to its south. Some documents do not acknowledge the existence of the East Brookfield River and instead refer to this waterway as the Seven Mile River, although it is the Five Mile River that the Lake Lashaway Dam impounds creating Lake Lashaway, which feeds this river, not the Seven Mile. Quaboag Pond is part of the Chicopee River Watershed and it drains into the Quaboag River.

== Fishing ==
Lake Lashaway, which flows into this pond, offers good fishing for many warm water fish. A survey conducted in 1994 showed thirteen species including Large and Small-mouth Bass, Chain Pickerel, Yellow Perch, White Perch, Black Crappie, Bluegill, Pumpkinseed, Brown and Yellow Bullhead, Golden Shiner, and Sucker. Lake Lashaway was stocked with Northern Pike in the past.
