= Ronald B. Lee =

American Postal Service worker (1932–2020)

- Born: May 26, 1932; Harlem, New York, U.S.
- Died: December 15, 2020 (age 88); Las Vegas, Nevada, U.S.
- Burial place: United States Military Academy Post Cemetery West Point, Orange County, New York, U.S.
- Education: Springfield College United States Military Academy, West Point, Class of 1954 Syracuse University, New York (M.B.A) Western New England University (LL.D)

Ronald Barry Lee (May 26, 1932 - December 15, 2020) was a United States Postal Service worker, corporate executive and army major. Lee was the first African American from New England to be accepted into West Point, graduating in 1954. He was also the first African American Assistant Postmaster-General under Postmaster General Winton M. Blount and alongside James Farmer was one of the highest ranking black men in the Nixon Administration.

== Early life ==
Lee was born on May 26, 1932, in Harlem, New York City, to Kermit J. Lee (1909-1991) and Lillian Jackson Lee (1910-2017). The family moved to Springfield, Massachusetts, a year later, where they had their other four children: Kermit Lee Jr. (a noted architect and professor at Syracuse University), William, Judith, and Deborah. Their father, Kermit, was the first black bank teller in Springfield and worked for the Third National Bank of Hampden County and their mother, Lillian, worked in local schools. The family were communicants at St. John's Congregational in the city.

Lee attended Springfield's public schools and graduated from the city's Classical High School in 1949 and briefly attended Springfield College before transferring to West Point in 1950, joining the class of 1954.

== Career ==
Lee became the first black man to attend West Point from New England. At West Point, Lee studied engineering and was active on several sports teams and organizations. Upon leaving West Point as a 2nd Lieutenant in 1954, Lee served in several military positions in the US, then served in Okinawa, Japan, from 1956 to 1959, worked briefly with the US Army Signal School, then served as an operations advisor for an infantry unit in Vietnam from 1962 to 1963. During his service, Lee rose to the rank of Major. Following his return from Vietnam, Lee served with Army Material Command until 1965, when he was accepted as a White House Fellow. Lee also earned his M.B.A. in business administration from Syracuse University in 1964. Lee resigned his commission in 1966.

=== White House Fellow ===
At 33 years old, Lee was one of 15 people chosen to be in the inaugural White House Fellows program, initiated by President Lyndon B. Johnson, in 1965. In this program, he worked under Larry F. O'Brien, then Postmaster General and also a native of Springfield. After leaving the Fellow program in 1966, Lee briefly worked as a professor as well as assistant provost and director of the Center for Urban Affairs at Michigan State University and was a PhD candidate at American University. Lee received an honorary doctorate of laws (LL.D) from Western New England University in 1969.

=== Assistant Postmaster General ===
In 1969, based on his earlier work with the postal service, Lee was sworn in as Assistant Postmaster-General by President Richard Nixon. As Assistant Postmaster, Lee headed the Bureau of Planning, Marketing, and System Analysis, suggesting several reforms for the service. Lee left the Postal Service in 1972 to become the director of marketing analysis for Xerox.

== Personal life ==
Lee married Joyce Thomas and they had two children. Lee died on December 15, 2020, in Las Vegas, Nevada, at the age of 88.
