= Lake Lashaway =

Lake in Massachusetts, United States

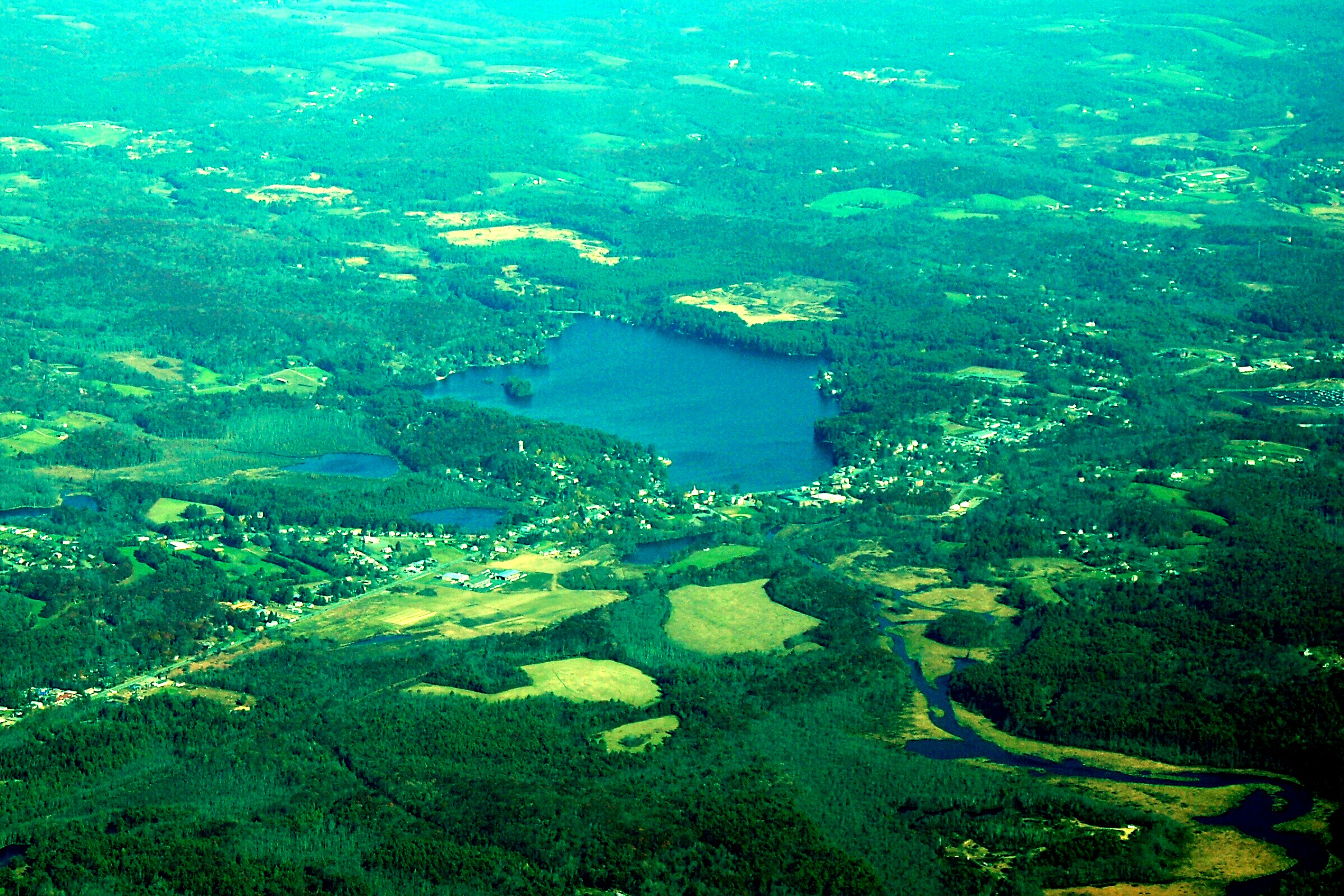

- Location within Massachusetts Location within the United States
- Location: North Brookfield / East Brookfield, Massachusetts, United States
- Coordinates: 42°14′05″N 72°02′41″W
- Basin countries: United States
- Surface area: 293 acres (1.19 km^{2})
- Average depth: 10 ft (3.0 m)
- Max. depth: 18 ft (5.5 m)
- Shore length^{1}: 5.1 mi (8.2 km)
- Surface elevation: 615 ft (187 m)
- Settlements: East Brookfield North Brookfield
- ^{1} Shore length is not a well-defined measure.

Lake Lashaway is a 293-acre (1.19 km^{2}) artificial lake located in Worcester County, Massachusetts, near the towns of East Brookfield and North Brookfield and just to the north of state Route 9 as it passes through East Brookfield. The East Brookfield and North Brookfield town lines run through the lake.

== History ==
Before Lake Lashaway was formed, the area was a small, meandering stream surrounded by meadows. The upper part of the lake was covered by thick pine forest, which was logged and cleared during the construction of the dam to clear for flooding. This area, along with the larger Five Mile River and Quaboag River area, was occupied by the Quaboag and Lashaway tribes, who were a part of the Nipmuc Nation. They used the rivers as travel routes for commerce.

Around 1825, former Revolutionary War lieutenant and East Brookfield resident Jeduthan Stevens purchased a large tract of meadowlands, across the stream from the land he already owned. Over several years, he constructed a dam and rerouted the stream to flow back towards and through his own mill-dam, generating hydropower for local grist and saw mills owned by both Stevens and other town residents. This damming of the river created Lake Lashaway. It was initially known as Stevens Pond, and was also called Furnace Lake and Crystal Lake. By the 1890s, summer cottages were being built around Lake Lashaway, and in the early 1900s Lashaway Park was created for summer recreation and activities.

The original dam was replaced in 1926 following significant storm damage in 1921, and sections required repair and rebuilding following damage from hurricanes and floods in 1938 and again in 1955. In 1967, Lake Lashaway and the dam were deeded to the Town of East Brookfield.

The Lake Lashaway Community Association, officially incorporated in 1980, began drawing down the lake 8 to 10 ft (2.4 to 3.0 m) to suppress nuisance vegetation growth in 1986. In 1999, significant repairs to the dam were made, including repairs with rebar and resin to 1.5 ft (0.46 m) gouges along the 45 ft (14 m) face of the dam.

== Description ==
Lake Lashaway is an artificial warmwater lake formed by Lake Lashaway Dam on the East Brookfield River, which impounds the waters of the Five Mile River and a local aquifer in North Brookfield. Outflow from the dam travels about 2 mi (3.2 km) down the river and feeds Quaboag Pond, the headwaters of the Quaboag River. Lake Lashaway is part of the Chicopee River Watershed.

The average depth is 10 ft (3.0 m) with the maximum depth being about 18 ft (5.5 m). Per measurements by the Massachusetts Division of Fisheries and Wildlife (DFW), the water color is brown and the average transparency, as measured by Secchi disks, is about 10 ft (3.0 m). Numerous houses and cabins line the shore, inhabited both by seasonal and year-round residents. A well-known children's summer camp, Camp Atwater, is on the north shore in North Brookfield.

There are some non-native invasive aquatic plant species present in Lake Lashaway, primarily fanwort (Cabomba), twoleaf watermilfoil (Myriophyllum heterophyllum), and brittle naiad (Najas minor). Native aquatic plant species include common naiad (Najas flexilis), coontail (Ceratophyllum demersum), American waterweed (Elodea canadensis), and fern-leaf pondweed (Potamogeton robbinsii).

== Fishing ==
Lake Lashaway has been managed as a warmwater fishery. Fish species present in the lake include panfish such as bluegill (Lepomis macrochirus) and pumpkinseed (Lepomis gibbosus), fallfish (Semotilus corporalis), golden shiner (Notemigonus crysoleucas), brown bullhead (Ameiurus nebulosus) and yellow bullhead (A. natalis), yellow perch (Perca flavescens) and white perch (Morone americana), chain pickerel (Esox niger), white sucker (Catostomus commersonii), smallmouth bass (Micropterus dolomieu) and largemouth bass (M. salmoides), and black crappie (Pomoxis nigromaculatus).

The lake was rumored to be stocked with Northern Pike in the past although no recent catches have been reported. Limited ramp parking and a large range of other species make this a better panfish lake than bass fishery compared to other lakes in the area such as Quaboag and South Ponds.

== Coordinates ==
=== Lake Lashaway Dam ===
- 42°13′34″N 72°03′00″W

=== Lake Lashaway ===
- 42°14′05″N 72°02′41″W
