= Hodgkins School =

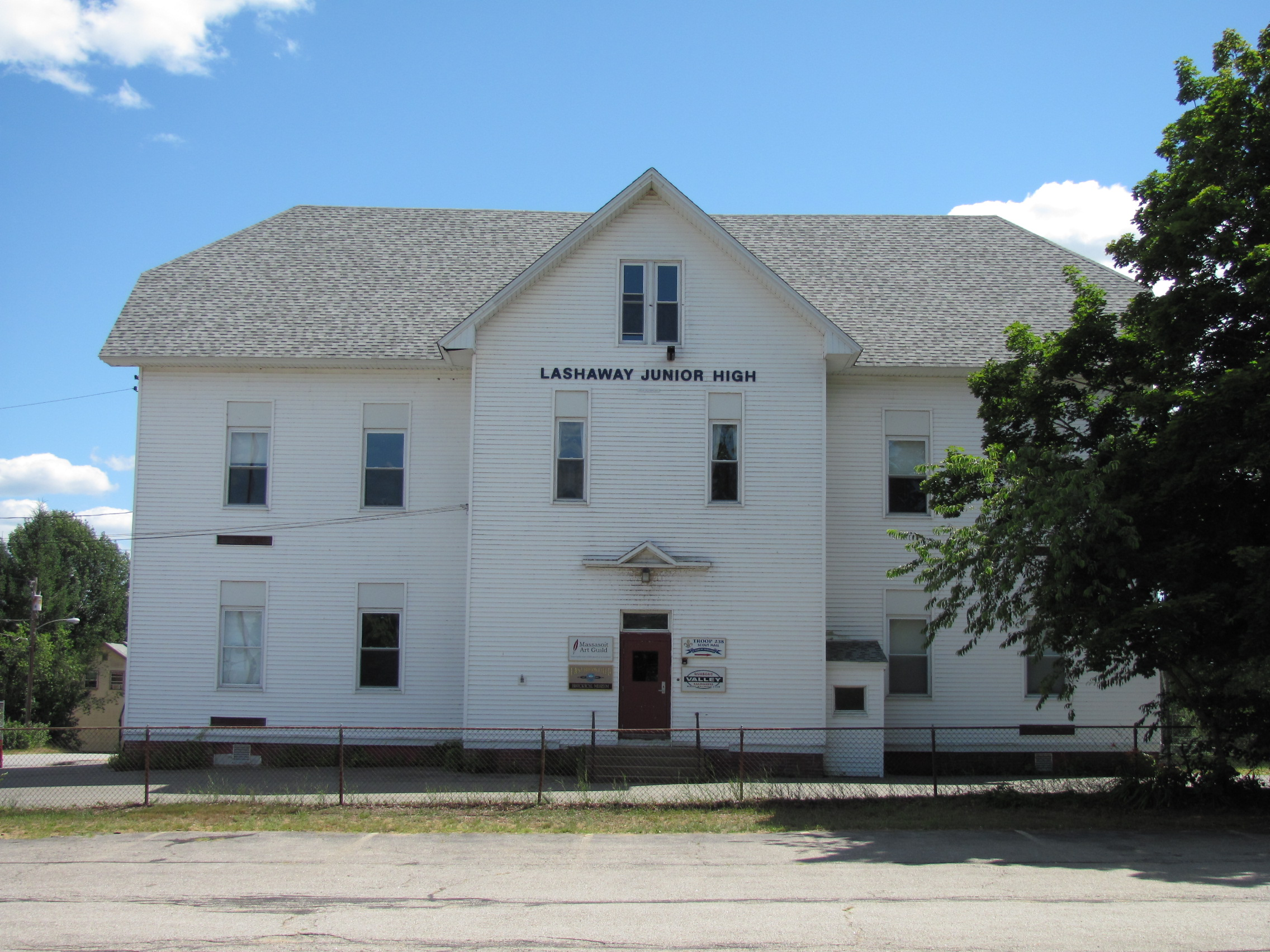
- Hodgkins School also known as Lashaway Junior High

Location
- 108 School Street; East Brookfield, Massachusetts; East Brookfield, Worcester, Massachusetts 01515; United States; 42°13′32.50″N 72°3′3.25″W

Information
- School type: Public Elementary School
- Established: 1882
- Status: Closed
- Closed: 2002
- Grades: 4-6
- Language: English
- Communities served: Town of East Brookfield

The Hodgkins School was a former elementary school in East Brookfield, Massachusetts, United States. At the time of its closing in 2002, it was the oldest continuously operating public school building in the state.

== History ==
The school was named after David Hodgkins, a former United States army surgeon who later served as the town's doctor and on the school committee of the town. At the time, it cost $6297.53 to construct. The school housed students in first through ninth grades with those in Grades 1 through 6 in Hodgkins Elementary School and Grades 7 through 9 called Lashaway Junior High. Both "schools" were housed in the same building. Depending on enrollment, two grades were at times combined in the same room sharing a teacher. The school served the community as the sole school in town until 1957 when the nearby Memorial School was erected adjacent to the site. The school continued to be used as a junior high from the mid-1950s to 2002, when both the Memorial School and the Hodgkins School were closed and the students and staff were moved into the brand new East Brookfield Elementary School.

Currently, the building is owned by the Town of East Brookfield and is home to the Historical Museum, the Massasoit Art Guild, the Quaboag Valley Railroaders, and Scouts BSA Troop 238.
