= Brooks Pond (Massachusetts) =

Lake in the U.S. state of Massachusetts

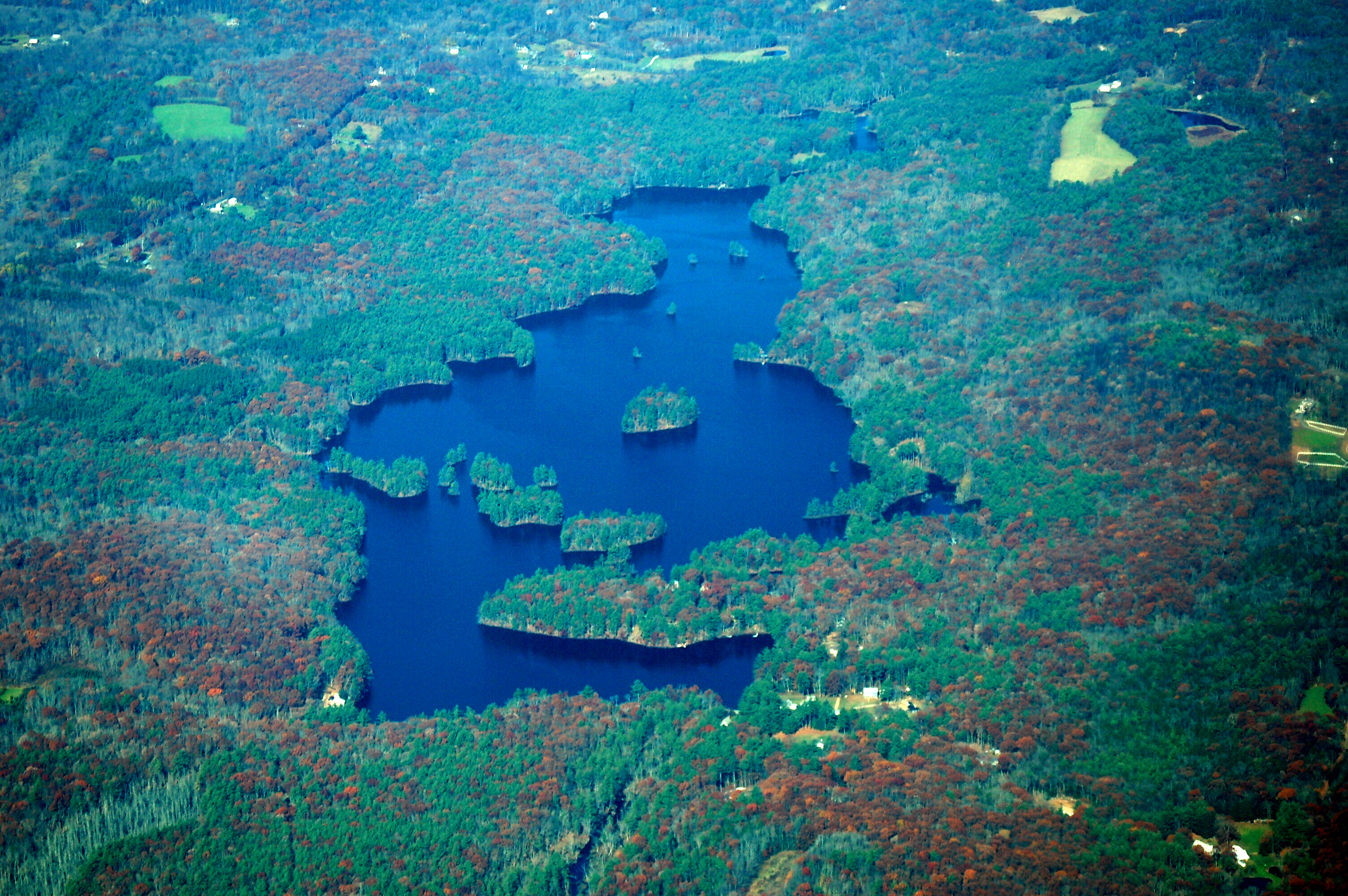
- from the air

- Location within Massachusetts Location within the United States
- Location: Worcester County, Massachusetts, United States
- Coordinates: 42°18′06″N 72°02′31″W
- Type: Pond
- Primary outflows: 5.5 ft³/s (0.156 m³/s)
- Catchment area: 190 acres (77 ha)
- Basin countries: United States
- Max. length: ≈2.2 mi (3.54 km)
- Max. width: ≈1.6 mi (2.57 km)
- Surface area: ≈3.5 mi² (9.06 km²)
- Average depth: 12 ft (3.7 m)
- Max. depth: 20 ft (6.1 m)
- Shore length^{1}: ≈4 mi (6.44 km)
- Surface elevation: 665 ft (203 m)
- Settlements: New Braintree / North Brookfield / Oakham / Spencer
- ^{1} Shore length is not a well-defined measure.

Brooks Pond is a Massachusetts water body that is privately owned, controlled and managed, and bordered by the towns of North Brookfield, Oakham, Spencer, and New Braintree. It forms the headwaters of the Five Mile River, which is part of the Chicopee River Watershed.

== Information ==
Brooks Pond is a mostly shallow pond dammed up roughly to its present size in 1848. The actual impoundment/size was again altered slightly after the Hurricane of 1938 washed out the existing bridge and resulted in a slight relocation of the spillway outlet/entry into the Five Mile River. Brooks Pond has been demonstrated via two separate recent studies, including one conducted by an expert firm, to originally have been well under 10 acres (40,000 m^{2}) in size in its naturally occurring state, thus disqualifying it as a Massachusetts Great Pond. This has been affirmed in a Massachusetts Court Case (Ref: Worcester Superior Court, Civil Action No. 04-0341, dated December 31, 2009. Judgment on Finding issued January 6, 2010). As noted above, it has been considerably enhanced in size by an earthen dam and cast spillway, and some parts range to 26 feet (8 m) in depth. The water is generally clean but exhibits slight coloration from leaf tannin and gets quite warm in the summertime. Brooks Pond is near a watershed boundary where waters to its north and west are part of the Ware River watershed and waters to its south and east are part of the Quaboag River watershed. Situated in a heavily forested area, the character of the pond in decades past—of mainly just summerhomes—has yielded to increasing numbers of permanent, full-time residences along its lengthy shoreline.

== Fishing ==
Brooks Pond offers limited fishing opportunities chiefly for the more experienced angler. While there are many warm-water fish present, the large shallow expanses extending beyond the original pond are too shallow, warm and de-oxygenated to support larger fish for much of the year. Less experienced and less skillful anglers thus catch mostly small fish and recite the old saw that the pond is over-fished—which it may be. Nevertheless, despite that popular mantra, Brooks gives up a few hefty largemouth bass to those with the skills to locate and catch them.
