= Ethan Allen (armsmaker) =

American Arms maker

- Born: Ethan Allen; September 2, 1808; Bellingham, Massachusetts, United States
- Died: January 7, 1871 (aged 64); Massachusetts, United States
- Occupations: Inventor, businessman
- Spouses: Mary Harrington; Sarah Mary Johnson
- Children: Laurette Allen Wadsworth, Nettie Allen Forehand

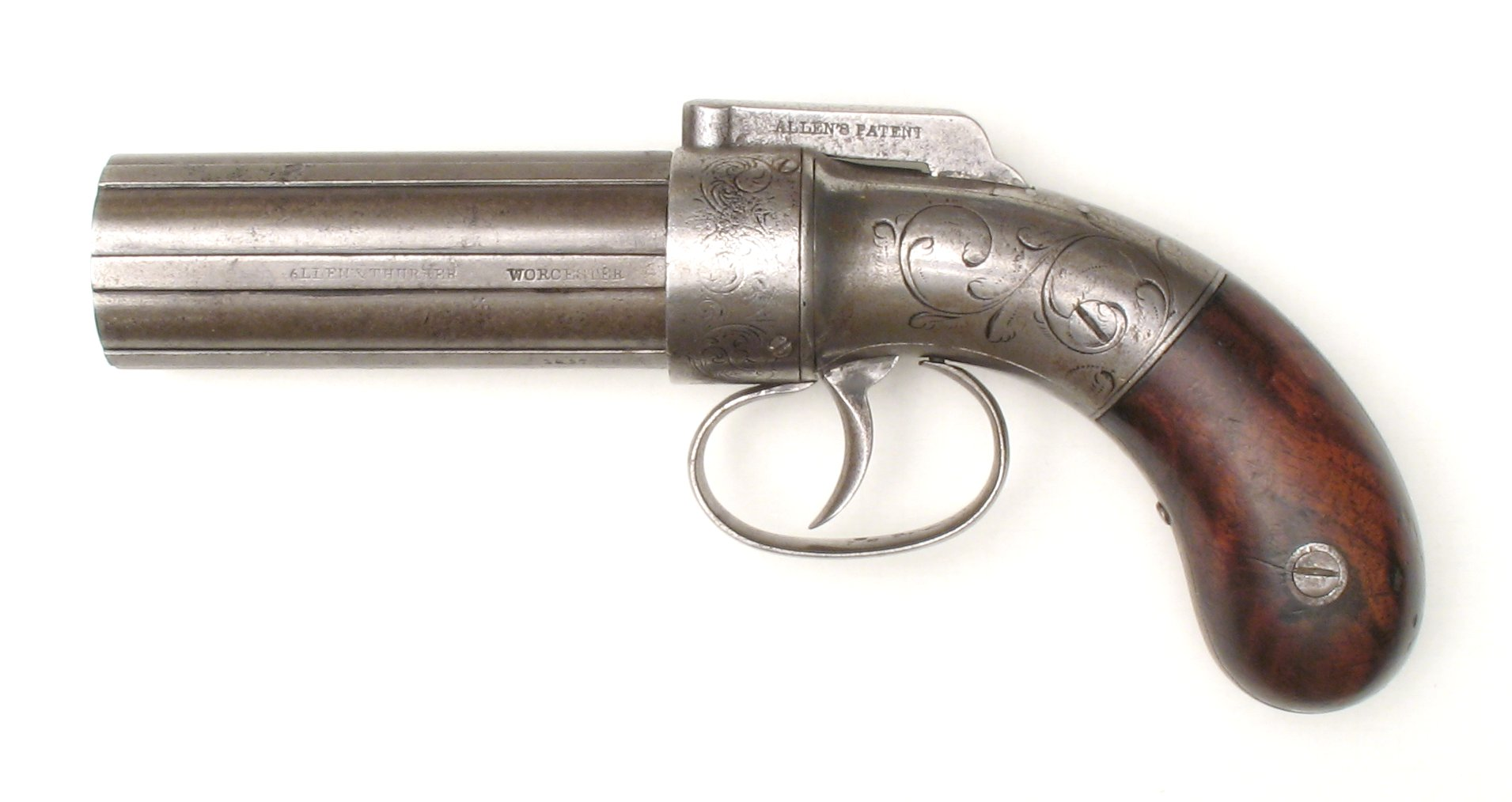
6 shot .36 caliber percussion pepperbox by Allen & Thurber (Worcester). Barrel flute bears 1837 patent date, hammer is marked "Allen's Patent".

Ethan Allen (September 2, 1808 – January 7, 1871) was a major American arms maker from Massachusetts. He is unrelated to the revolutionary Ethan Allen. His first firearm, the "Pocket rifle" was developed in 1836, and his first patent was granted in 1837.

== Early life ==
Allen began his career as a cutlery maker in Milford, Massachusetts, in 1831. He gained knowledge of metalworking and manufacturing processes by producing knives and shoemaking tools before moving his business to Grafton.

While working on a cane gun for a doctor, Allen came up with the idea for an underhammer pocket rifle and designed it in 1836. The following year he applied for a patent for a "tube hammer" pocket pistol and went into business with his brother-in-law, Charles Thurber. Ethan proved to be a true family man, investing and partnering with a nephew in a New York sporting goods retailer, hiring another brother-in-law Thomas Wheelock who was eventually made a partner, and similarly hiring and later making partners his two sons-in-law Sullivan Forehand and Henry Wadsworth. The latter two continued the business under their own names after Allen died in 1871.

== Trade names ==
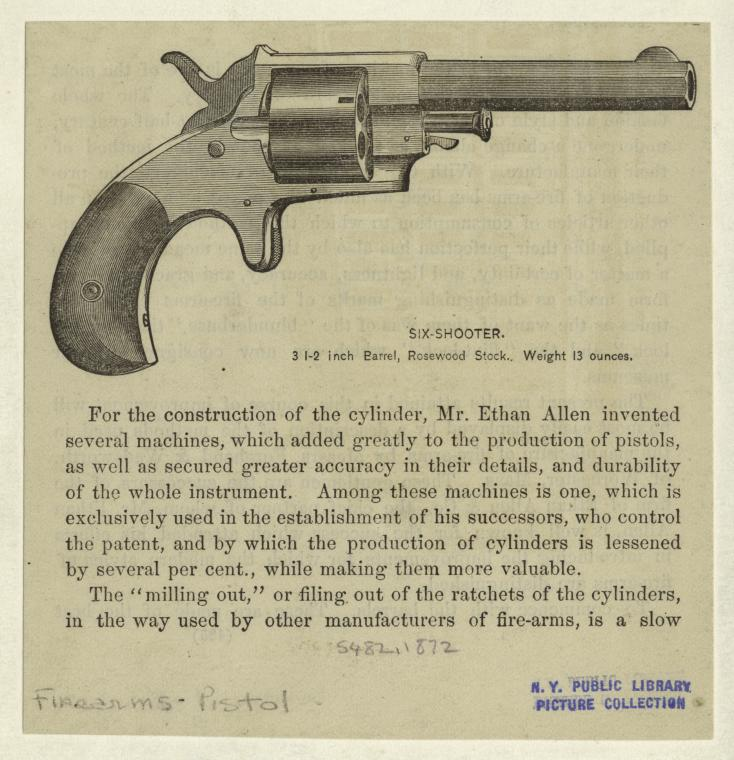
Ethan Allen six-shooter advertisement

1831–1837: E. Allen (Grafton)
1837–1842: Allen & Thurber (Grafton)
1842–1847: Allen & Thurber (Norwich)
1847–1854: Allen & Thurber (Worcester)
1854–1856: Allen Thurber & Co (Worcester)
1856–1865: Allen & Wheelock (Worcester)
1865–1871: E. Allen & Company (Worcester)

In 1843, the company relocated to Norwich, Connecticut. In addition to arms making, they built prototypes of Thurber's typewriter designed for the blind, disabled, and those “nervous” about writing by hand. Though patented, the typewriter was never manufactured for commercial sale.

In 1847, the company moved to Worcester, Massachusetts, and in 1854, Wheelock became an equal partner with the firm's name changing to Allen Thurber & Co. In 1856, following Thurber's death, the company reorganized as Allen & Wheelock. After Wheelock's death in 1865, Allen's two sons-in-law, Sullivan Forehand and H. C. Wadsworth, began working for him, and the company changed its name to Allen & Company. Upon Allen's death in 1871, the two operated the company under their own names, Forehand & Wadsworth, until Forehand reorganized the company in 1890 as the Forehand Arms Company after Wadsworth's retirement.

Ethan Allen's companies made a vast variety of firearms. Most recognized is the Allen & Thurber "pepper-box" revolving pistol—known as the "Gun that won the East". This pistol was actually much more common than the early Patterson Arms revolvers made by Colt. Few records survive, so much is derived from the physical weapons still in existence and by extrapolating from advertisements, patent dates, etc.

== Single-shot and double-shot percussion pistols ==
Pocket rifle

Allen's first firearm was the "Pocket rifle", a single-shot under-hammer percussion pistol. The name likely derives from the fact that most pistols of the day did not have rifled barrels, rather than any claim to extraordinary size. The hammer located on the bottom of the weapon allowed for target sights to be mounted on the top axis of the barrel. Made in .28 to .44 caliber, the average barrel length was 12 inches. Typically sold in pairs, the pocket rifle was produced from 1837–1847. Though most of this period was during the Thurber partnership, markings show exclusively 'Ethan Allen', and evidence from an accounting ledger indicates that supply and distribution orders were processed separately from other models of firearms. This likely indicates that Allen retained ownership of this model after establishing the partnership with Thurber. A second pocket rifle was produced under the Allen and Thurber name, retaining the under-hammer design but with much smoother lines. The pictures the author has seen show a barrel much shorter than 12 inches, and the caption reads .36 caliber.

Tube Hammer pistol

A single-shot percussion pocket pistol with the hammer in the more usual top position for contemporary pistols. The spectacular innovation was the 'double action' which allowed firing simply by pulling the trigger. Most firearms of the day and for decades thereafter were 'single action', requiring the user to manually cock the firearm prior to pulling the trigger. The barrel had a smooth bore with no rifling. With no sights, this was a close-range personal defense weapon used with a 'point and shoot' method rather than careful aiming. This model also introduced a screw barrel, allowing for easy disassembly and cleaning. Judging solely from patent dates, production of this pistol began around 1837 and continued beyond 1844 when a patent reissue was granted.

Model 6 Shotgun Hammer boot pistol

Single-shot percussion pistol.

Model 9 Bar Hammer pistol

The tube hammer was followed shortly by the Bar Hammer single-shot percussion pistol. Produced in a wide variety of calibers and barrel lengths, the Model 9 introduced a bar-shaped hammer on the top of the barrel which would be less likely to catch on clothing when drawn from a coat pocket. Barrel length was typically 2-6 inches with a smooth bore, while the most common calibers were .30-.36. Retaining the double action, single shot, screw-barrel design of the tube-hammer, the Model 9 was a success and was produced well into the Allen and Wheelock era. Though made possibly as early as 1837–1838, the bar hammer was eventually marked with an 1845 patent date.

Inline pistol

Single-shot percussion pistol.

Double-barreled single trigger pistol

Percussion pistol.

== Revolver pepperbox percussion pistols ==
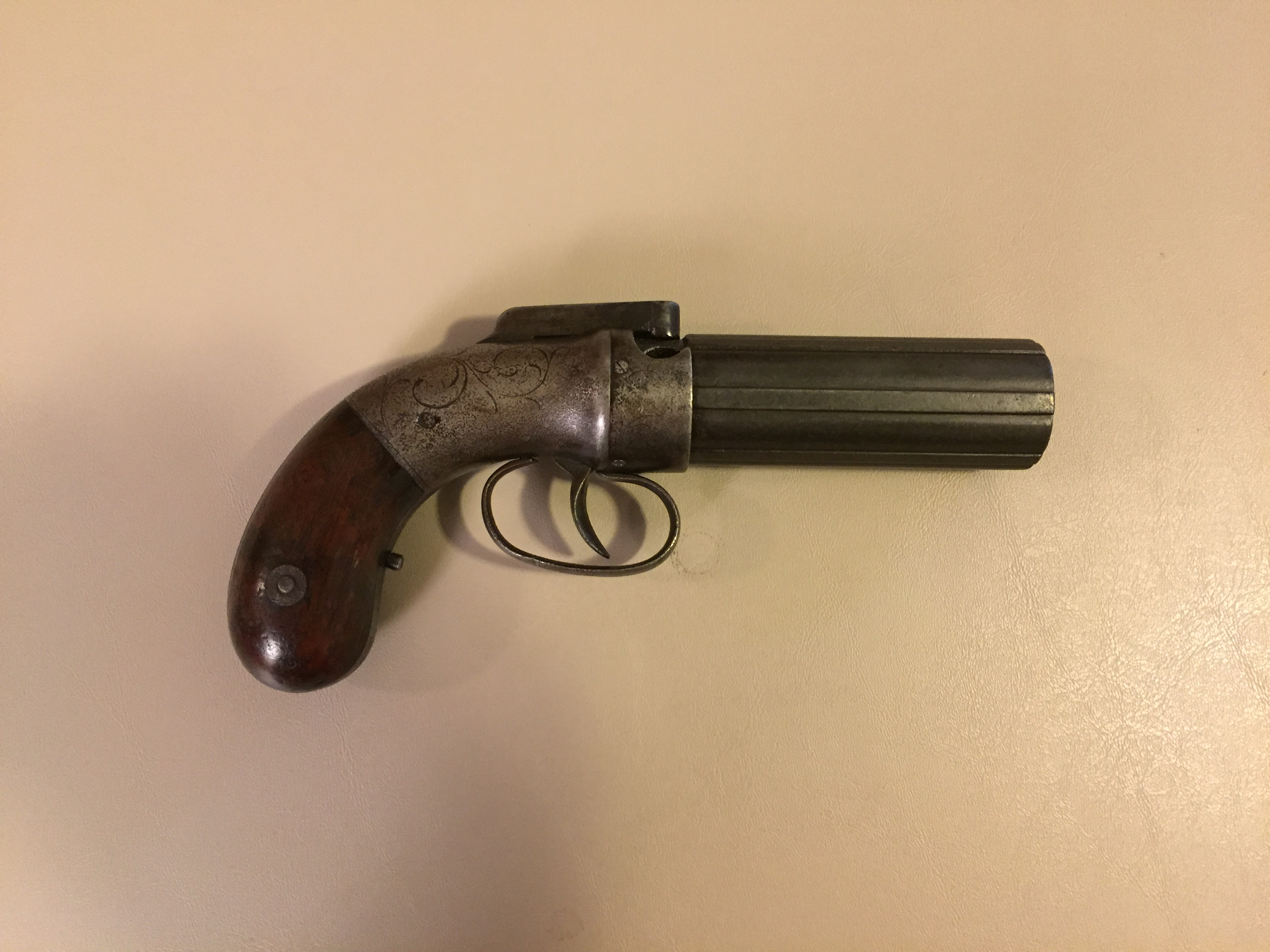
Allen and Wheelock revolver pepperbox, 6-barrel 1845 patent date

An entire volume could be written about the variations of the Allen and Thurber iconic pepperbox 'revolving pistols'. Often referred to as 'the gun that won the east', the Allen and Thurber pepperbox was a favorite of '49ers' and other early immigrants to the western United States. Mark Twain famously quipped that these pistols often discharged more than one barrel when fired, and were not much of a danger to the target, but were dangerous to the shooter. Holding several patents, Allen and Thurber pepperboxes were the most popular multi-shot pistols of the 1830s and 1840s, slowly losing market share in the 1850s to Colt's 1849 Pocket and 1851 Navy revolvers. The later revolver pepperboxes were produced well into the Allen and Wheelock era. During the American Civil War, due to a shortage of pistols, many soldiers on both sides carried an Allen & Thurber pepperbox as a backup arm. Harley Van Cleve and his son Phillip collected and categorized 22 distinct models/variations of the Allen pepperbox, and were an invaluable early 20th-century resource for these pistols. Patent dates of 1837 and 1845 help to demarcate sub-models to a limited extent, but many improvements were incorporated on the fly to reduce manufacturing costs and/or create a more reliable product. The 1845 patent represents several simplifications to the design that likely achieved both of these aims. Pepperbox production did not survive the end of the Allen and Wheelock era (c 1864). Due to the number produced, smaller pepperbox pistols are common on the secondary market in a wide spectrum of conditions. The Dragoon model noted below is quite rare and commands a premium even in scruffy condition. Please see the cited work for extensive descriptions, illustrations, and a wide variety of photographs.

4-barrel pepperbox pistols

The four-shot pepperbox was introduced during the Allen and Wheelock era, highlighting that the pepperbox was still an important design through the end of the 1850s. A patent dated 1857 shows that the four-shot barrel assembly attached to the frame in a different manner than the six-shot and five-shot pepperboxes. The standard caliber was .34. All of the pictures this author has seen do not show a nipple shield.

5-barrel pepperbox pistols

It was during the Worcester period that the five-shot pepperbox was introduced. Percussion nipples were integrated into the barrels. It would have been expensive to make the machining, but it would likely have significantly reduced production costs. Made with a bar hammer and standard trigger, models have been encountered with or without an integral nipple shield. .32 was the most common caliber. The five-barrel is relatively rare compared to the six-barrel models

6-barrel pepperbox pistols

Only six-barrel pepperbox pistols were produced during the Grafton and Norwich periods (1837–1847), and all had smooth barrel external contours until the later Worcester and Allen and Wheelock period, when fluted barrels became the norm. Six-barrel pepperboxes usually have a standard trigger, but some examples have a ring trigger. Most were double-action with the iconic 'bar hammer', but some were single-action with standard hammers. While simplifying shooting (no manual cocking of the hammer), the bar hammer did preclude the inclusion of usable sights. However, this early example of a double-action pistol must have been quite a selling point. As these were considered 'point and shoot' short-range defensive weapons or 'belly guns', the market did not seem to object to the limitation of not having sights. Barrel length varied between three and six inches. There were four frame sizes, accommodating various calibers. Most common were .32 and .34 caliber, though the .28 and .30 caliber 'pocket size' have been reported. The 'Dragoon' model was the king, typically sporting six-inch barrels and .36 caliber. Except for early models and later Allen and Wheelock era production, most have engraving on the frame.

== Percussion revolvers ==
Bar-Hammer percussion revolver

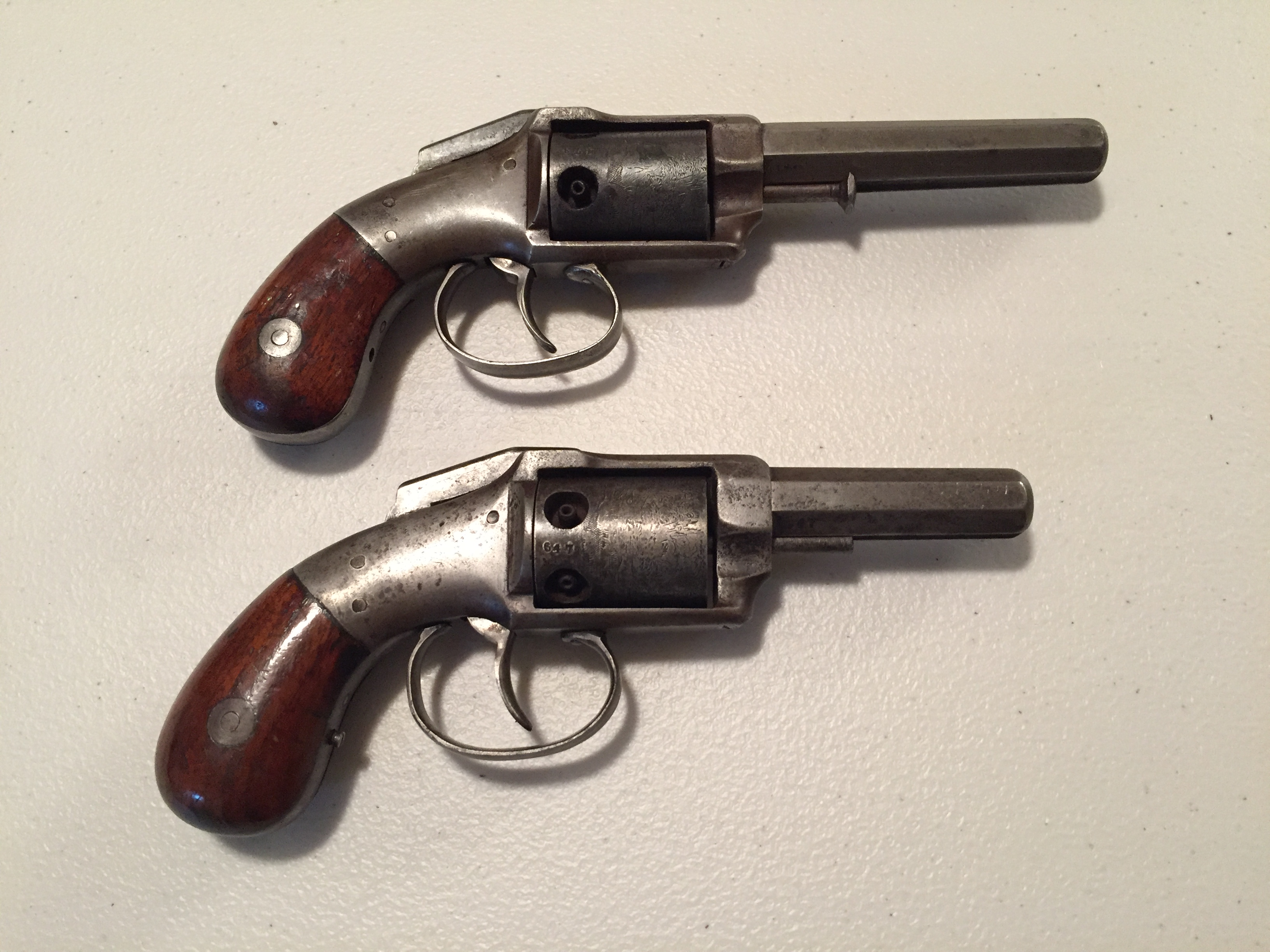
Allen and Wheelock Bar Hammer percussion revolvers medium and large frame models

It is uncertain when production of the bar-hammer revolver began or ended. The 1845 patent on the bar-hammer is the same as on the pepperbox and some single-shot pistol models. It is likely some number of years after 1845 before this type was produced. A patent for Rollin White was issued in 1858 that pictured a modified Allen bar-hammer revolver. This would seem to indicate that production started no later than 1856–1857. However, it is possible that production started several years earlier. Production almost certainly ended before the end of the Wheelock era (c 1864). This is based on no more than the logic of simplifying production. In 1861, it is possible that Allen produced the bar-hammer, side-hammer, and center-hammer percussion revolvers as well as the rimfire and lipfire cartridge revolvers simultaneously. Because demand from the Civil War was consuming just about any arm produced, it would have made sense to cease production of the less advanced models. The lineage of the pepperbox is clear in the cylinder design, grip design, standard-style trigger, and patented bar hammer double-action design. This may represent a simple design evolution, as the double-action pepperbox 'pocket pistols' were very popular. Allen may have been counting on visual and functional design similarity to help sell these revolvers. The design may also have been intended to avoid patent issues. By incorporating his unchallenged 1845 patent for the bar-hammer double-action mechanism, Allen may have wished to avoid any patent infringement problems from Colt for his own revolving mechanism if the revolver was produced before the expiry of the Colt patent in 1857. Considering all of the evidence that Allen was a thoughtful and frugal businessman, it may simply demonstrate that using common parts was less expensive than designing new ones. The finish was blued, with wood grips as standard, though ivory could be had for an extra cost. The Allen bar-hammer is quite advanced in that pulling the trigger advances the cylinder, cocks the hammer, and drops the hammer, firing the weapon. The cylinder can be removed for cleaning by removing the cylinder pin. A separate ramrod would be needed for loading. The cylinder would likely be removed for loading, so reloading under duress is not practical. The author finds these revolvers aesthetically pleasing and very practical for a pocket pistol. This style was manufactured and sold in three different sizes.

Small frame Bar-Hammer revolver

The small frame is a five-shot, .28 caliber revolver, though some .30 caliber models are known. The barrel is 2.5 inches long. The cylinder is engraved with a scene of forest animals identical to the 'pocket-size' side-hammer percussion revolver. As with many models, changes were made during production, and collectors note an 'early' and 'late' variation.

Mid frame Bar-Hammer revolver

The mid-frame is a five-shot, .32 caliber revolver. The barrel is approximately 3 inches long. The cylinder is engraved with a scene of forest animals identical to the 'belt-size' side-hammer percussion revolver, and a few examples have the frame surface finely engraved as well. As with many models, changes were made during production, and collectors note an 'early' and 'late' variation.

Large frame Bar-Hammer revolver

The large frame is a five-shot, .34 caliber revolver. The barrel is 3.5-4 inches long. The cylinder is engraved with a scene of forest animals identical to the 'belt-size' side-hammer percussion revolver, and a few examples have the frame surface finely engraved as well. As with many models, changes were made during production, and collectors note an 'early' and 'late' variation.

Side-Hammer percussion revolver

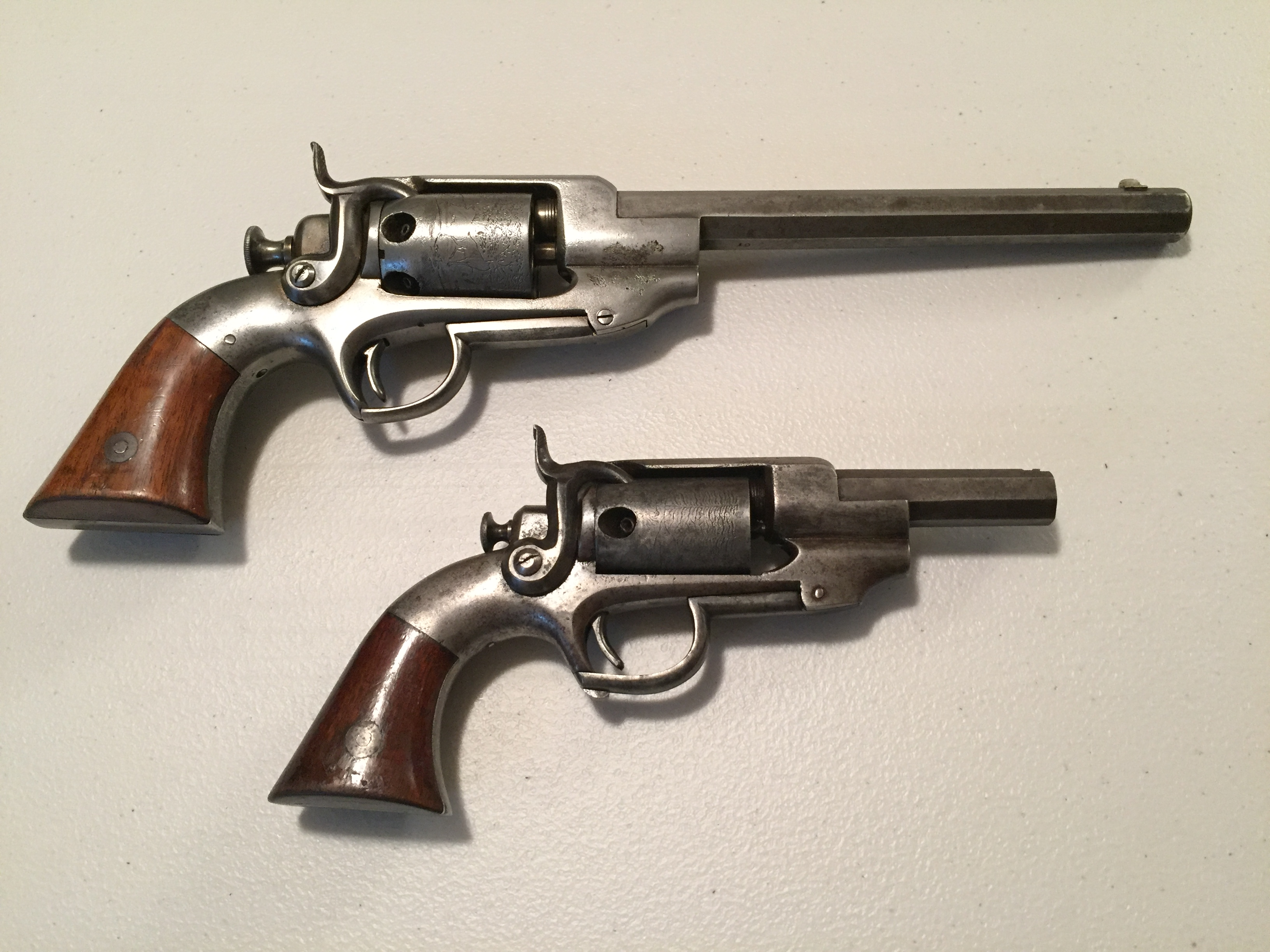
Allen and Wheelock Side Hammer percussion revolvers Navy and belt models

The author has found the side-hammer models to be the most interesting of all of the Allen revolvers. Allen's design was clearly influenced by Colt's 1855 'Root' revolver, adopting the top strap above the cylinder for strength, rigidity and thus accuracy, and the side-hammer rather than the center hammer more usual on the Colt models 1847, 1848, 1849 and 1851. Another 'borrowed' feature was that the cylinder pin unscrewed from the rear, which the author finds far superior to the various methods of removing to the fore of the pistol. Though influenced by this near contemporary, Allen attempted to build the 'better mousetrap' by incorporating several unique and patented design features. One change was to retain the standard trigger used in the bar-hammer revolvers rather than Root's spur trigger. One new feature is the combination trigger guard/loading lever. Unlike Colts, Remingtons, and other percussion revolvers that aligned a lever to load the cylinders under the barrel, Allen designed his revolvers to incorporate the trigger guard for this function. A catch is tripped, and the trigger guard and attached arm swing down to push a rammer into the bottom cylinder, thus seating the ball fully into the chamber. This reduced the number of parts and likely cost of manufacture. This patented, unique feature carried on into the later center-hammer percussion models. There were four distinct cylinders, varying in the machining. All models are single-action. The finish was blued, with wood grips as standard. Ivory or silver grips could be had for an additional cost. Though manufactured in much smaller numbers than the Colts, Remingtons, Starr, and other revolvers of the Civil War, Allen and Wheelock revolvers are clearly visible in many pictures of the era. The dates of manufacture are uncertain, possibly beginning as early as the expiry of the Colt patent in 1857. This is supported by a patent granted to Allen in January 1857 covering the loading lever as described. As frugal as Allen was, it is unlikely that production would have ended before the consumption of all parts, even though the new center-hammer percussions were also being produced. It is unlikely that production survived the end of the Wheelock era (c 1864).

Navy model Side-hammer revolver

The Navy model is a six-shot, .36 caliber weapon. The cylinder is engraved with a scene of forest animals. The Navy model used the first and fourth cylinder type, which is 1 7/8 inches long. Barrels were available in six- and eight-inch lengths. Although there are many small variations, there are no essential design changes. There are no known government contracts, though the Army Ordnance Department did purchase 338 on the open market.

Belt model Side-hammer revolver

The Belt model is a five-shot, .32-caliber weapon. As the patent shows a five-shot pistol, the belt model likely was the first produced. There are some examples in .31 and .34 caliber. The cylinder is engraved with a scene of forest animals. Standard barrel lengths included 4, 5, 6 and 7 1/2 inch. The Belt model used the second, third, and fourth cylinder type, which was 1 11/16 inches long. Three different model variations are generally accepted.

Pocket model Side-hammer revolver

The Pocket model is a five-shot, .28 caliber weapon. The cylinder is engraved with a scene of forest animals. The pocket model only used the fourth cylinder type, which was 1 9/16 inches long. The standard barrel length is four inches. Three different model variations are generally accepted by collectors.

Center-Hammer percussion revolver

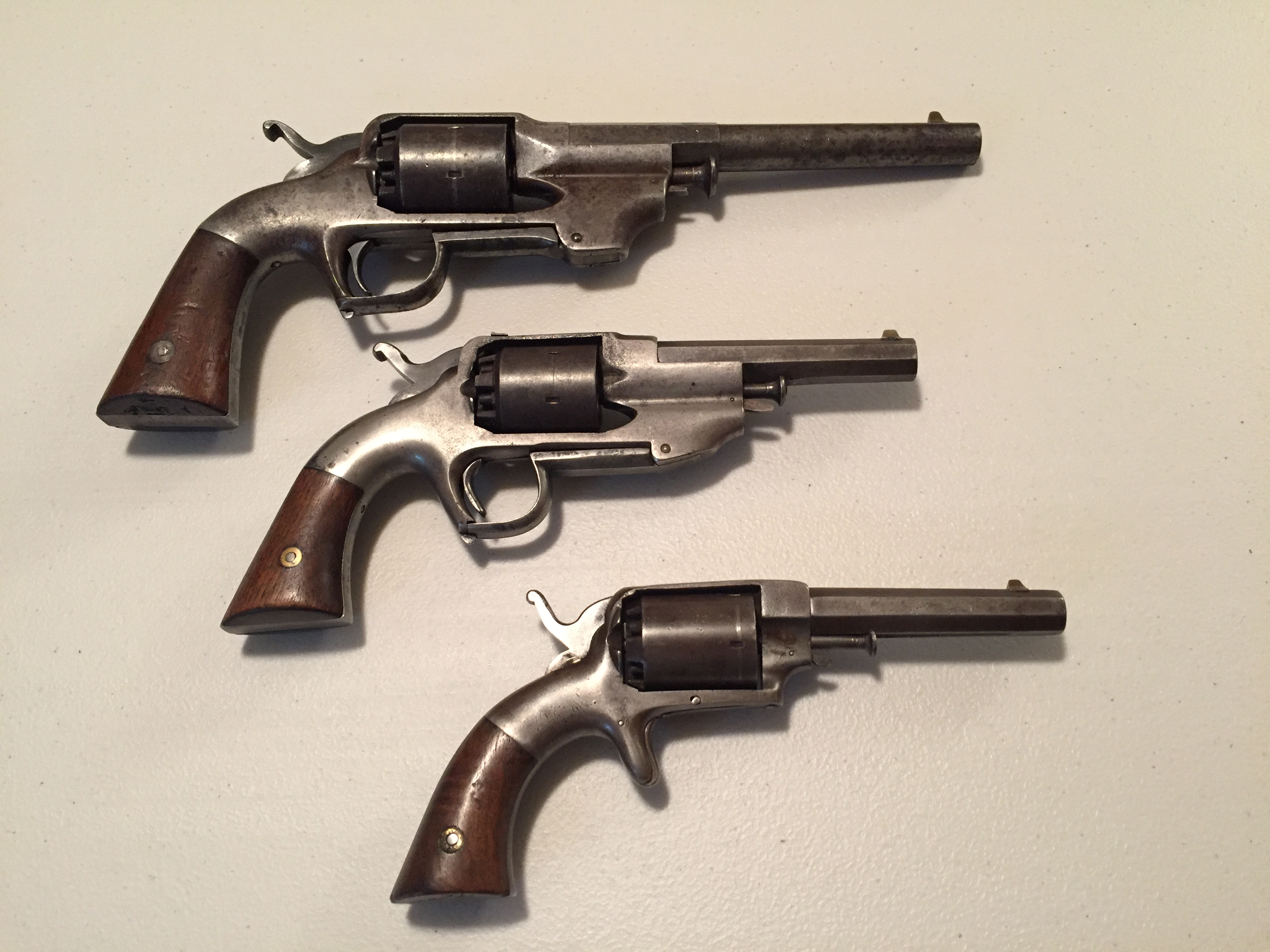
Allen and Wheelock Center Hammer percussion revolvers Navy, Army and Providence Police models

The center-hammer percussion models bear a striking resemblance to the larger lipfire revolvers. All were single-action. Ethan Allen showed much evidence of being astute and frugal, and the design likely evolved as a way to share between a percussion series and the new lipfire weapons. Why would Allen make percussion arms at all when the more advanced cartridge revolvers were available? The oft-referenced patent lawsuit may have caused Allen to 'hedge his bets' in case he lost and would have to cease production of cartridge revolvers (as happened in 1863). It may be that cartridge firearms were a new and uncertain technology. A conservative market, as epitomized by the US Army Ordnance Department, was buying the established technology percussion weapons by the thousand. Even Smith and Wesson failed to obtain a government contract during the war for their cartridge revolvers. In any event, the center-hammer percussion revolvers were likely seen as a replacement for the side-hammer and possibly bar-hammer revolvers in production. As with many Allen arms, the start date of manufacture is uncertain. With patent dates including 1857, 1858, 1860, and 1861, many have posited that this revolver was not made until after the settlement of the patent lawsuit in 1863. However, records indicate that the US Ordnance Department purchased about 200 from a Boston merchant in December 1861. Perhaps 1860 or early 1861 is accurate. Advertised and marketed to the military, the center-hammer was designed to be stronger and more rugged than the side-hammer revolver. In addition to the stronger frame, the cylinder pin access was moved to the front of the cylinder. The center-hammer revolvers retained the innovative combination trigger guard/loading lever of the side-hammer models.

Navy model revolver

The Navy model is a six-shot, .36 caliber percussion weapon with a standard 5-, 6-, or 7 1/2-inch barrel. Collectors recognize an early and a late production variant. The detailed design of variations suggests that the Navy followed the Army by some margin of time. The finish would be blued, with standard wood grips. Production likely continued until the end of Allen's life. Approximately 500 are thought to have been made. Only a few examples are known that have been converted to cartridges.

Army model revolver

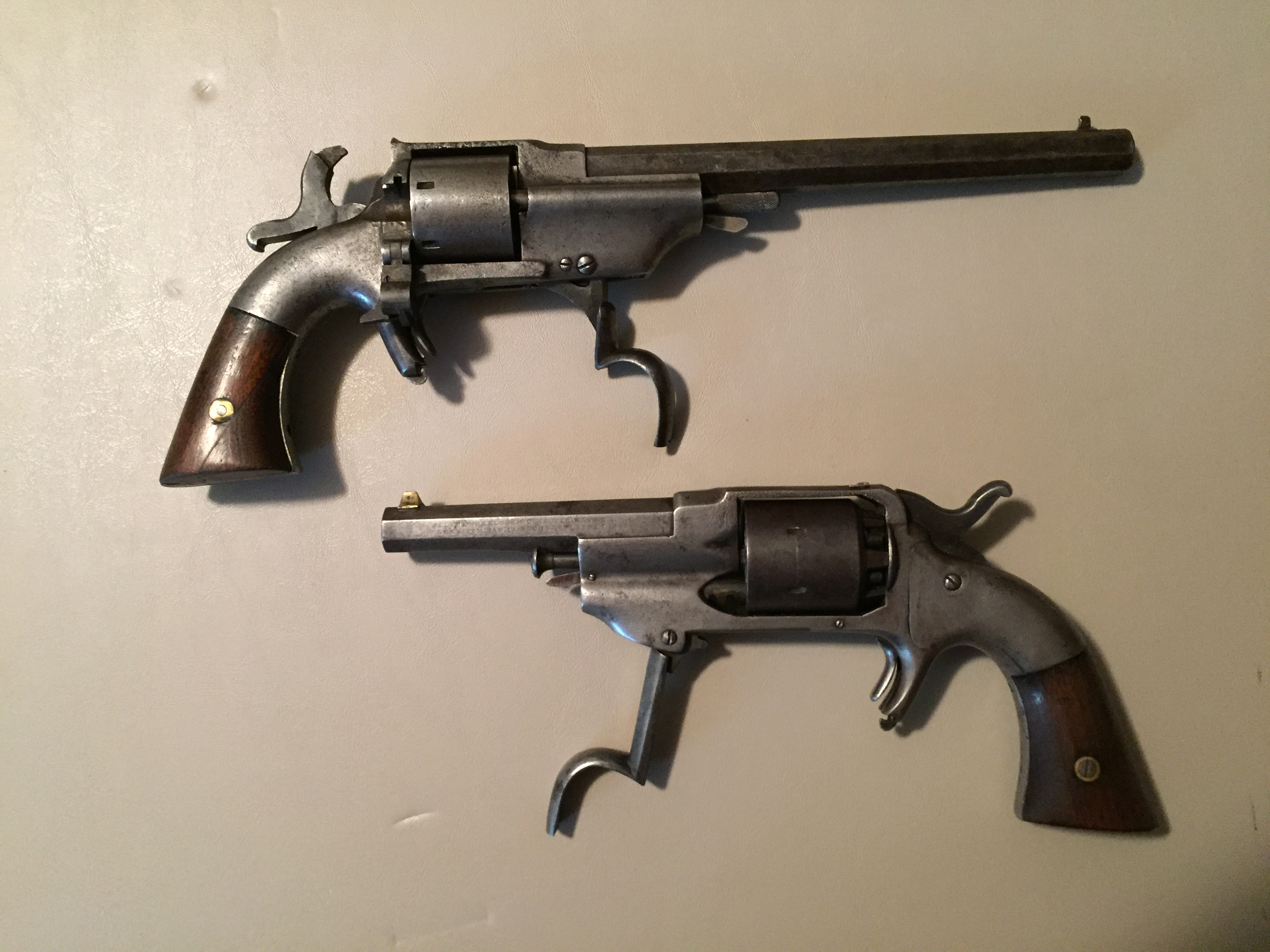
Trigger guards extended, demonstrating the loose powder, ball packing in percussion revolvers, and case extraction in lipfire cartridge revolvers

The Army model is a six-shot, .44 caliber percussion weapon with a standard 7 1/2-inch barrel. Collectors recognize an early and a late production variant. The finish would be blued, with standard wood grips. Production likely continued until the end of Allen's life. Approximately 750 are thought to have been made. Only a few examples are known that have been converted to cartridges. A fine 'custom' nickel Army with extensive engraving by Gustav Young and hand-carved ivory grips is thought to have been the personal weapon of Ethan Allen. This model is larger and heavier than the contemporary Colt Model 1860 Army.

Providence Police model revolver

This model is an anomaly that has bedeviled collectors for years. It is unmarked but has some distinctive design features patented by Allen. It is a five-shot .36 caliber weapon with samples including 3-, 4-, and 5-inch barrels. It is a bit of a throwback, without a loading lever and sporting a spur trigger. Known examples had a blue finish and wood grips. There are records indicating purchase by the Providence, Rhode Island, police department, hence the name commonly attributed to this model. It is possible that this was a specific contract, and the model was never marketed to the public. This may indicate production very late into the E Allen and Company era, shortly before Allen's death. His sons-in-law Forehand and Wadsworth may have deemed an obsolescent percussion pistol unworthy of bringing into the inventory of the company now sporting their names, and discontinued the model after that initial run.

== Cartridge pistols ==
Like many other arms makers, Ethan Allen saw the bored-through cylinder allowing for the rear loading of self-contained metallic cartridges as the wave of the future. Unfortunately, the patent holder, Rollin White, had sold exclusive rights to this innovation to Smith and Wesson, preventing other companies from making firearms leveraging the bored-through cylinder. This legal constraint proved no barrier to Ethan Allen, who made two different rimfire revolvers that hit the market possibly as early as 1857, simultaneous to the Smith and Wesson model 1. As a holder of many patents, it is unlikely that Ethan Allen was ignorant of patent law—he simply chose to ignore it. Perhaps, he reckoned that he could outlast the upstart Smith and Wesson in legal maneuvering. He soon invented the 'lipfire' cartridge, a modified rimfire that only held the priming compound in approximately 1/8th of the circumference of the base of the cartridge. This made the cartridge base much stronger, as early rimfire cartridges tended to split at the base, causing extraction malfunction. It was also more economical, as only 1/8th of the expensive fulminate was required. Ethan Allen then invented manufacturing equipment for metallic cartridges that far exceeded the competition in quality and efficiency. Allen was awarded a patent for the lipfire cartridge. Production of lipfire revolvers likely began around 1859. With the coming of the Civil War, Allen likely smelled immense profits for his 'better mousetrap'. However, the conservative procurement agents of the US Government awarded only small contracts—likely not trusting the technology or the supply of cartridges. By 1863, Rollin White finally won his patent infringement lawsuit, and production of all Allen and Wheelock cartridge revolvers ceased.

Rimfire revolvers

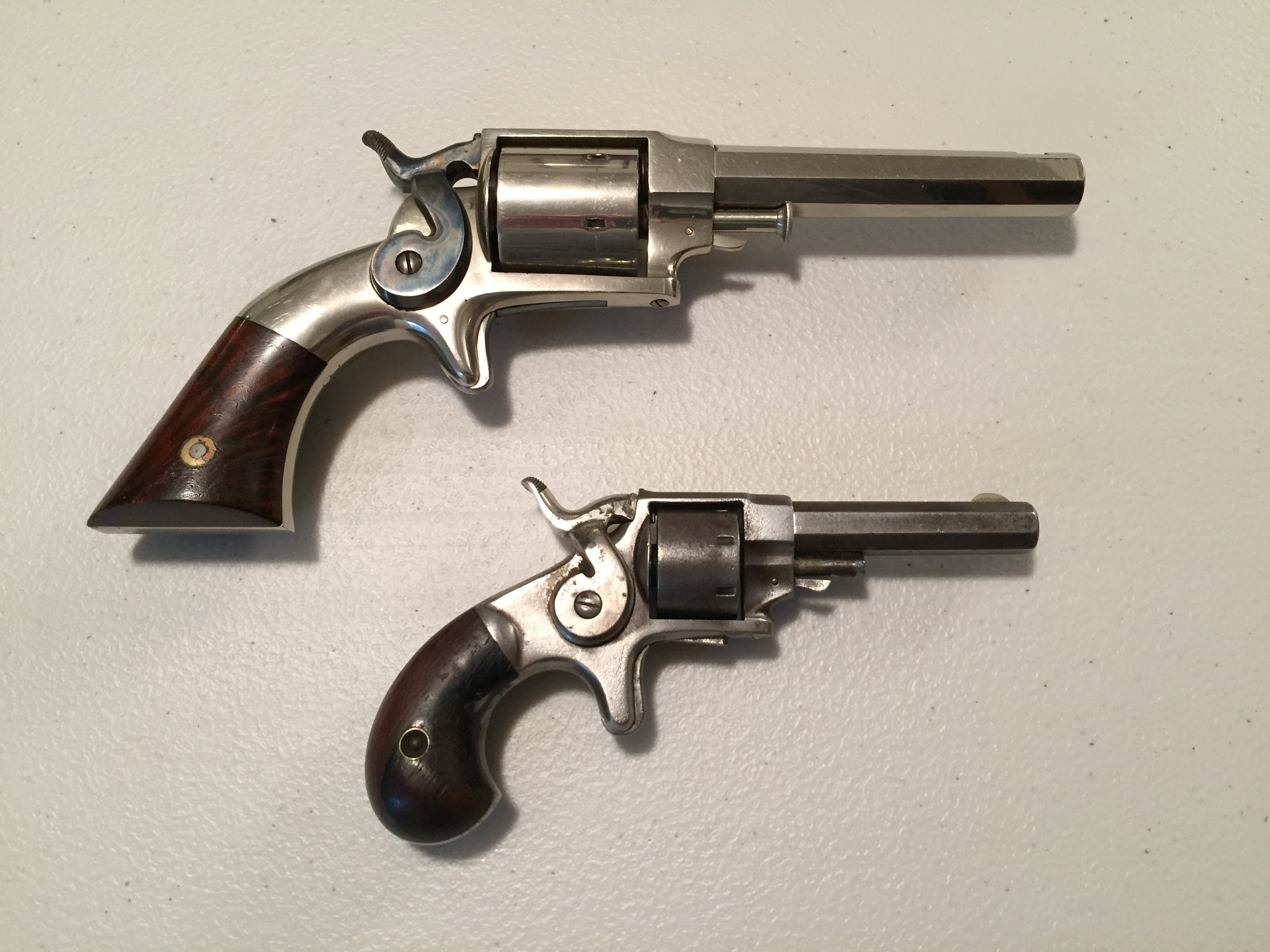
Allen and Wheelock pocket rimfire Side Hammer revolvers in .32 and .22 caliber rimfire

.22 caliber rimfire revolver

This is the first cartridge revolver made by Allen and Wheelock, and one of the first cartridge revolvers from any manufacturer (competing with the Smith and Wesson model 1). It is a single-action seven-shot revolver in .22 Rimfire (black powder equivalent of the modern .22 Short). It features the side-hammer of the early percussion revolvers and a spur trigger. Empty cases were removed by removing the cylinder and using the cylinder pin to push the case out of the cylinder. There are many variations, typically organized into six models, though all share the size and critical design features. Most were made with a 3-inch barrel. The first through fourth models have engraved cylinders, with crossed rifles, a horse and rider, military articles, an Indian with a bow, and a sailing ship. Allen obtained a patent granted in 1858, and production likely began in 1857. Production continued until 1863, when production of all cartridge revolvers was halted by the lawsuit described previously. Production resumed upon the expiry of the Rollin White patent in 1869, though likely from parts manufactured in the earlier period. After Allen's death in 1871, production continued for some period under the new company name Forehand and Wadsworth.

.32 caliber rimfire revolver

Following the introduction of the .22 Rimfire, Allen and Wheelock introduced the larger .32 Caliber Rimfire. Stronger to accommodate the more powerful cartridge, the .32 caliber followed the design cues of the .22 in being a single-action, spur-trigger revolver. The cylinder accommodated six cartridges, and barrels could be had in either three-, four-, or five-inch lengths. Engraving on the cylinder was a country scene with dogs chasing a rabbit. There are three 'models' with detail improvements, though the basic design remained unchanged. The cylinder, and consequently frame, length grew from .905 inch to .940 inch to 1.2 inches. Production likely began in 1858 and ceased in 1863 per the patent suit described above. Production, or at least assembly, resumed presumably at the expiration of the Rollin White patent as a catalog from 1871 offers them at $9.25. A patent was granted in 1860 to reduce drag on the recoil shield applied to this revolver as well as the lipfire revolvers. A later patent with a simplified action was granted in 1861. With the solid frame design, these revolvers were far stronger than the contemporary Smith and Wesson Model 2. In fact, the author would challenge that the design is much more sophisticated than the contemporary Smith & Wesson. Though it cannot be confirmed, it likely beat the Smith & Wesson Model 2 to market.

Lipfire revolvers

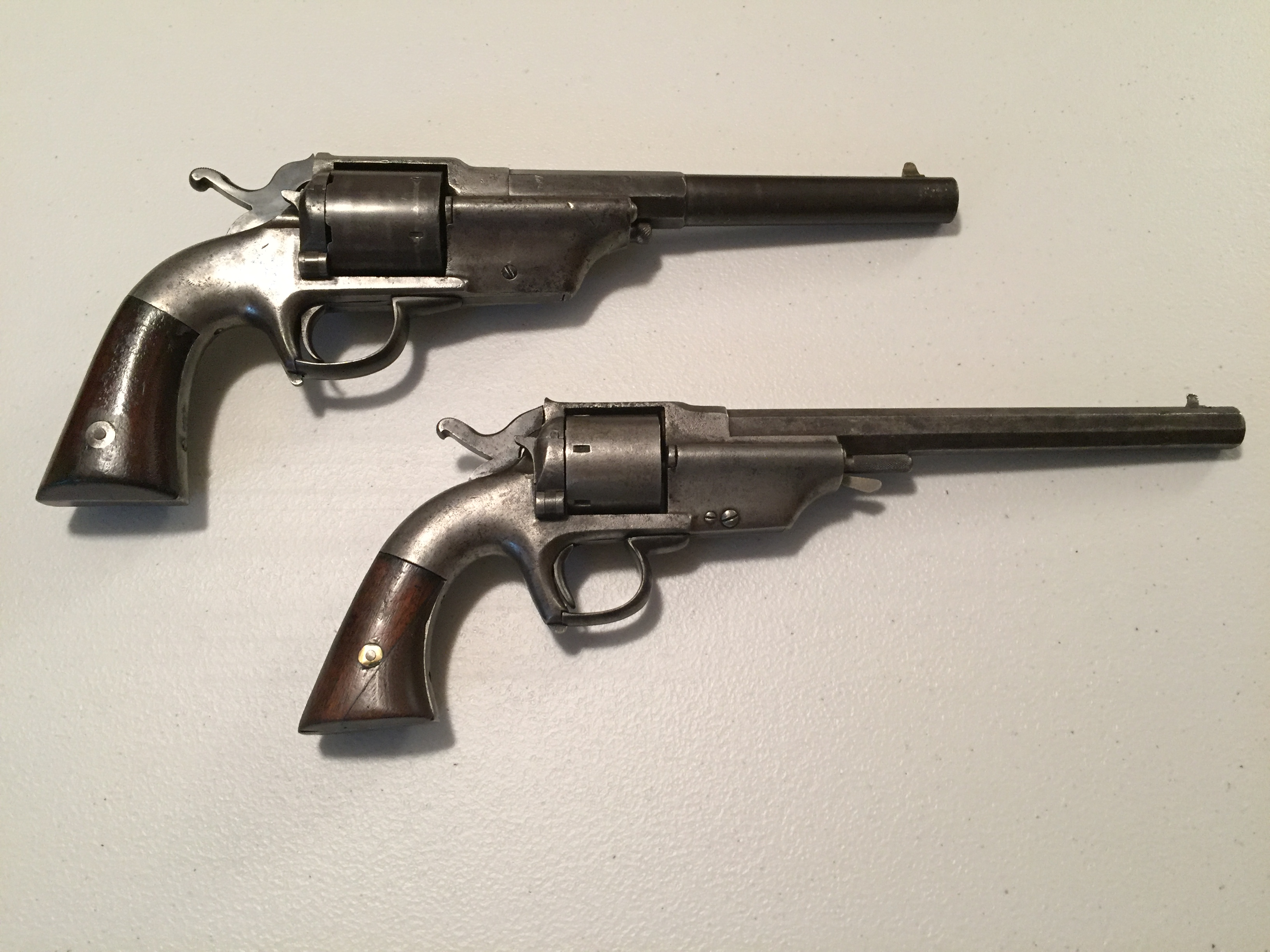
Allen and Wheelock lipfire revolvers Navy and Army models

Ethan Allen was granted a patent in September 1861 for his .44 caliber lipfire revolver. As this is more than a year since his patent on the lipfire cartridge, it is possible that lipfire revolvers were produced in late 1860 or early 1861. As many incomplete revolvers and parts would have been in existence at the time of the "cease and desist" court order from the patent infringement in 1863, this inventory was kept, and these revolvers were reintroduced when the White patent expired in 1869 until the parts stocks were depleted. All of the Allen and Wheelock lipfire revolvers were single-action. Many of the lipfire weapons were converted to rimfire with the simple removal, and machining of just a small amount on the rear face of the cylinder as supplies of the ill-fated lipfire cartridge dwindled. While it is not known for certain, some of these conversions may have occurred at the factory, especially for those assembled in or after 1869. Others were converted by any number of gunsmiths around the country. The Army model was the first "large bore" (more than .40 caliber) cartridge revolver and remained so until the Remington cartridge conversions of the model 1858 appeared in 1868—soon followed by the cartridge-designed Smith & Wesson Model 3 in 1869. Similarly, the Navy model was the only .36 caliber cartridge revolver until the similar conversion of Colt models 1851, 1861, and 1862 following the expiry of the Rollin White patent.

.25 caliber lipfire revolver

Made without a loading gate or ejection mechanism, the .25 caliber lipfire is still another unique design. To load or unload, this seven-shot pocket gun required the cylinder to be removed to load or unload the cylinder. With just a few exceptions, most of the .25 caliber revolvers carry no markings. It is speculated that these may have been very late to market before the loss of the patent suit as a 'spit in your eye' gesture to Smith and Wesson. A 3-inch barrel was standard.

.32 caliber lipfire revolver

The .32 lipfire sports a six-shot cylinder in a smaller caliber. The design of the .32 caliber lipfire breaks from its bigger brothers in several important ways. Firstly, it sports a spur trigger rather than using the standard trigger with a guard. Secondly, it uses a side-hammer of earlier design. Lastly, it ditches the trigger guard ejector/plunger for a weaker left-mounted plunger with rack and pinion gears to the top and left of the chamber. In design, it seems to be a marriage/compromise between its bigger brothers and the earlier .32 Rimfire revolver. Barrel lengths include 4-, 5-, and 6-inch.

.36 caliber lipfire revolver

Very similar in design to the 44 caliber lipfire, this revolver was 'downsized' slightly and chambered in .36 caliber. The cylinder has a six-shot capacity. As with the similar-sized center-hammer percussion, barrel lengths were produced in 5-, 6-, and 8-inch to accommodate different tastes. No significant variants are recognized, which may indicate that the .36 followed the .44 after the .44 design gestation.

.44 caliber lipfire revolver

The .44 was the first lipfire revolver produced. It sports a six-shot cylinder. Similar in appearance to the center-hammer percussion revolver, the rack and pinion mechanism of the loading level is hijacked to provide a cartridge case removal plunger. Thus the trigger guard pivots to actuate the plunger, as the center-hammer percussion revolver used the trigger guard to ram the load into the cylinder. Four variants are recognized, with 'narrow' and 'common' width grips and top vs. bottom hinges on the loading gate highlighting the difference. The standard barrel length was a massive 8 inches long, with the breadth and heft of the Army model center hammer percussion pistols.

Single shot rimfire pistols

With single-shot percussion pistols still selling well, it was natural that Allen would adopt cartridges to this style of pistol. A single-shot cartridge pistol also did not infringe on the Rollin White patent as described above.

.22 caliber rimfire side swing pistol

.32 caliber rimfire side swing pistol

== Cartridges ==
On September 25, 1860, Ethan Allen was granted a patent for his lipfire cartridge. He also manufactured pinfire cartridges from 1862 until at least 1865.

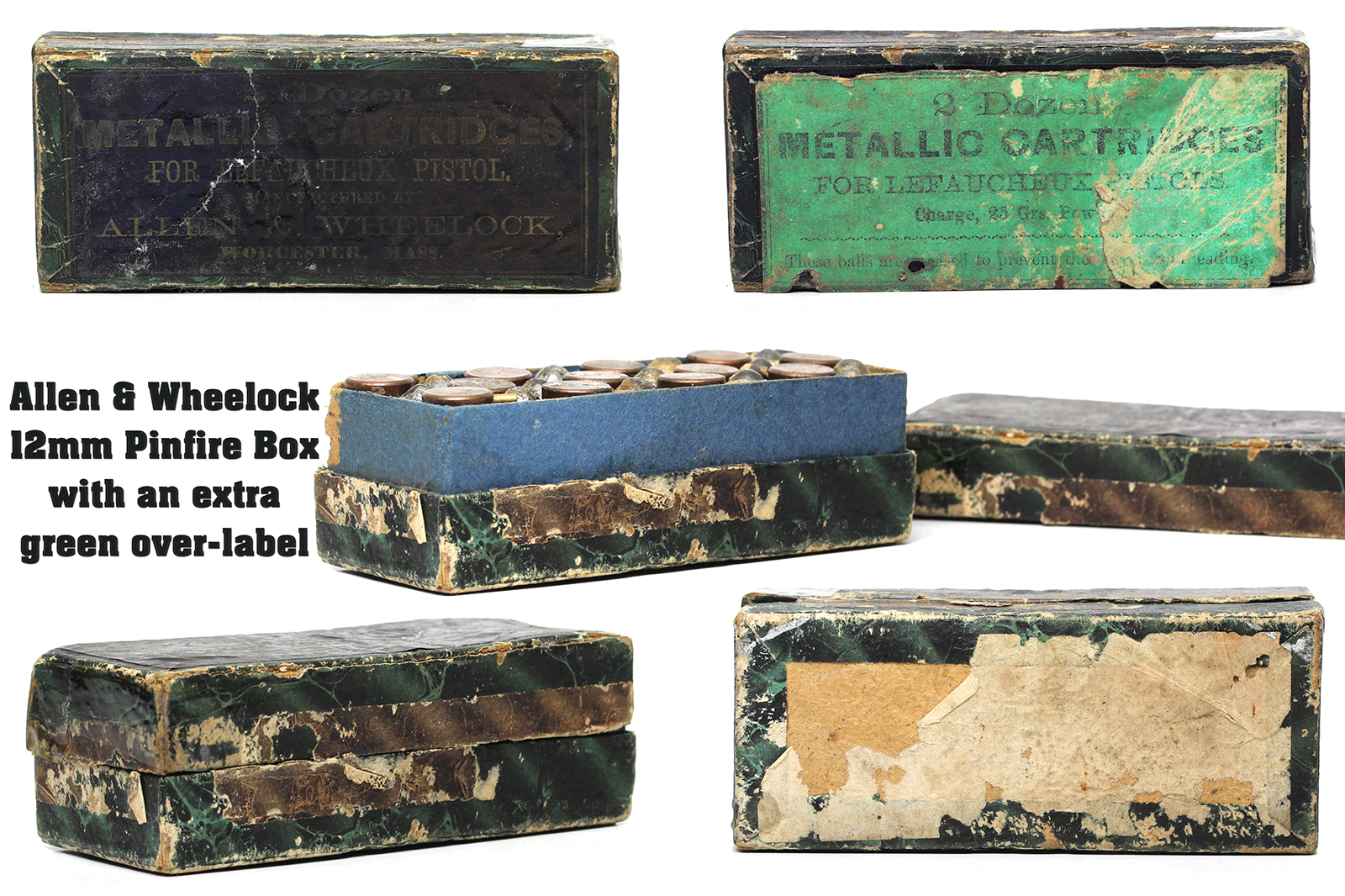
Pinfire cartridge box by Allen & Wheelock & Co.

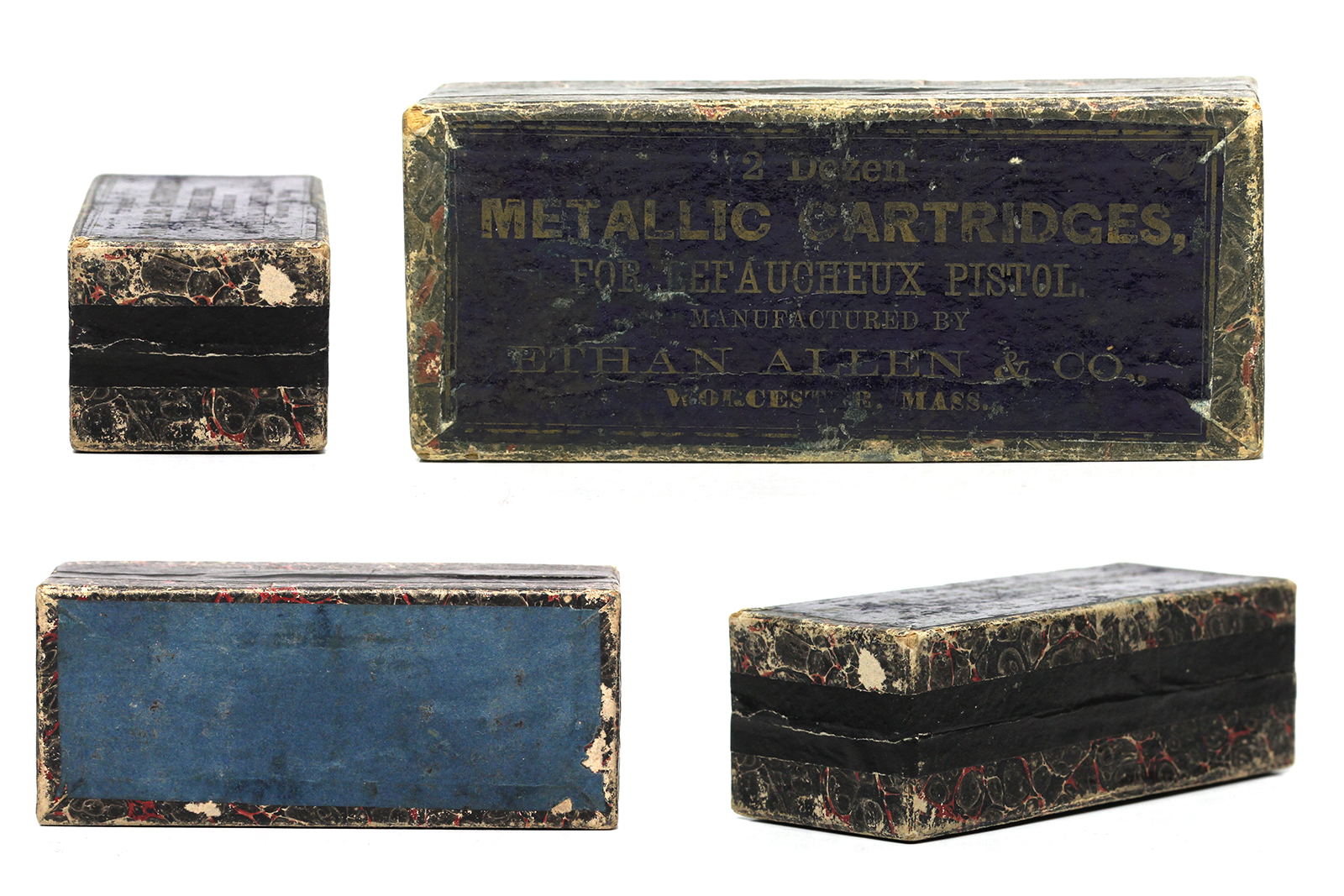
Pinfire cartridge box by Ethan Allen & Co.

== Sources ==
- The Story of Allen & Wheelock Firearms, H. H. Thomas (1965) (ISBN 0-913150-73-8)
- Ethen Allen, Gunmaker: His Partners, Patents and Firearms, Harold Mouillesseaux (1973) (ISBN 0-919316-68-9)
