= Charles Thurber (inventor) =

- Born: January 2, 1803; East Brookfield, Massachusetts
- Died: November 7, 1886 (aged 83)
- Known for: Inventor of Typewriter

Charles Thurber (January 2, 1803 – November 7, 1886) was an inventor and firearms maker who made important innovations in the early development of the typewriter. According to the book The Marvels of Modern Mechanism published in 1901, Thurber invented and patented in 1843 the first practical typewriter, though it admits his machine was slow, crude and was never manufactured.

== Career ==
Thurber was a partner with his brother-in-law, Ethan Allen in a firearms manufacturing company known as Allen & Thurber.

Aside from firearms, he developed multiple patents, the first in 1843 for an aid to the blind and in 1845 he patented his Chirographer

== Typewriter ==
The first practical typewriter was patented in 1843, with all the essential characteristics of the modern machine. Thurber's machine was never manufactured and a museum in Worcester contains the only model in existence.

== See also ==
- Typographer (typewriter)
