= Camp Atwater =

- U.S. National Register of Historic Places
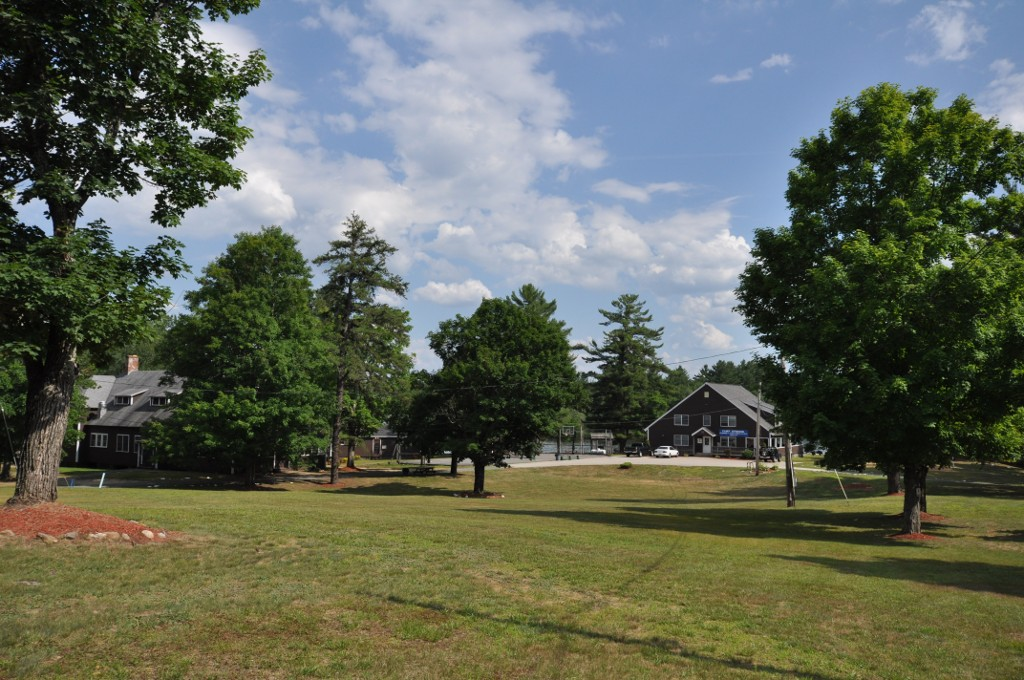

- Location within Massachusetts Location within the United States
- Location: Shore Rd., North Brookfield, Massachusetts
- Coordinates: 42°14′22″N 72°3′0″W
- Area: 67 acres (27 ha)
- Built: 1921
- NRHP reference No.: 82004477
- Added to NRHP: April 15, 1982

Camp Atwater is a summer camp on Shore Road in North Brookfield, Massachusetts. Originally named, St. John's Camp, it was established in 1921 by Dr. William N. DeBerry on the shores of Lake Lashaway. The camp gained the name "Atwater" when Mary Atwater donated $25,000 to Dr. DeBerry in 1926. They were funded to honor her late father who was Dr. David Fisher. Camp Atwater's mission was to provide a summer recreational experience for African-American boys, at a time when summer camps were generally racially segregated. The camp catered primarily to middle- and upper-class African Americans, and drew attendees from up and down the Atlantic coast. Notable attendees include Coleman Young, Clifford Alexander, Jr., Clifton Wharton, Jr., Hazel O'Leary, Dennis Hightower, and Wayne Budd. The camp was listed on the National Register of Historic Places in 1982. It is now owned and operated by the Urban League of Springfield.

The camp occupies 75 acres (30 ha) of land on the northern shore of Lake Lashaway. Of this, about 75 acres (30 ha) are wooded, while the developed area is mainly located between Shore Road and the lake. The camp owns 325 feet (99 m) of lakeshore, as well as a 3-acre (1.2 ha) island. Most of the camp facilities are organized around a U-shaped drive, and include the main hall, recreation hall, dining hall, and camper cabins. Recreational facilities include a variety of sports fields as well as basketball and tennis courts. There are fourteen camper cabins, housing between 8 and 25 campers in addition to counselors. The oldest building in the camp is White Cabin, which was built about 1760, and is one of two structures that predate the camp's founding. Located just on the north side of Shore Road, White Cabin was where the camp's first season of campers were housed.

== See also ==
- National Register of Historic Places listings in Worcester County, Massachusetts
