= East Brookfield, Massachusetts =

- Town
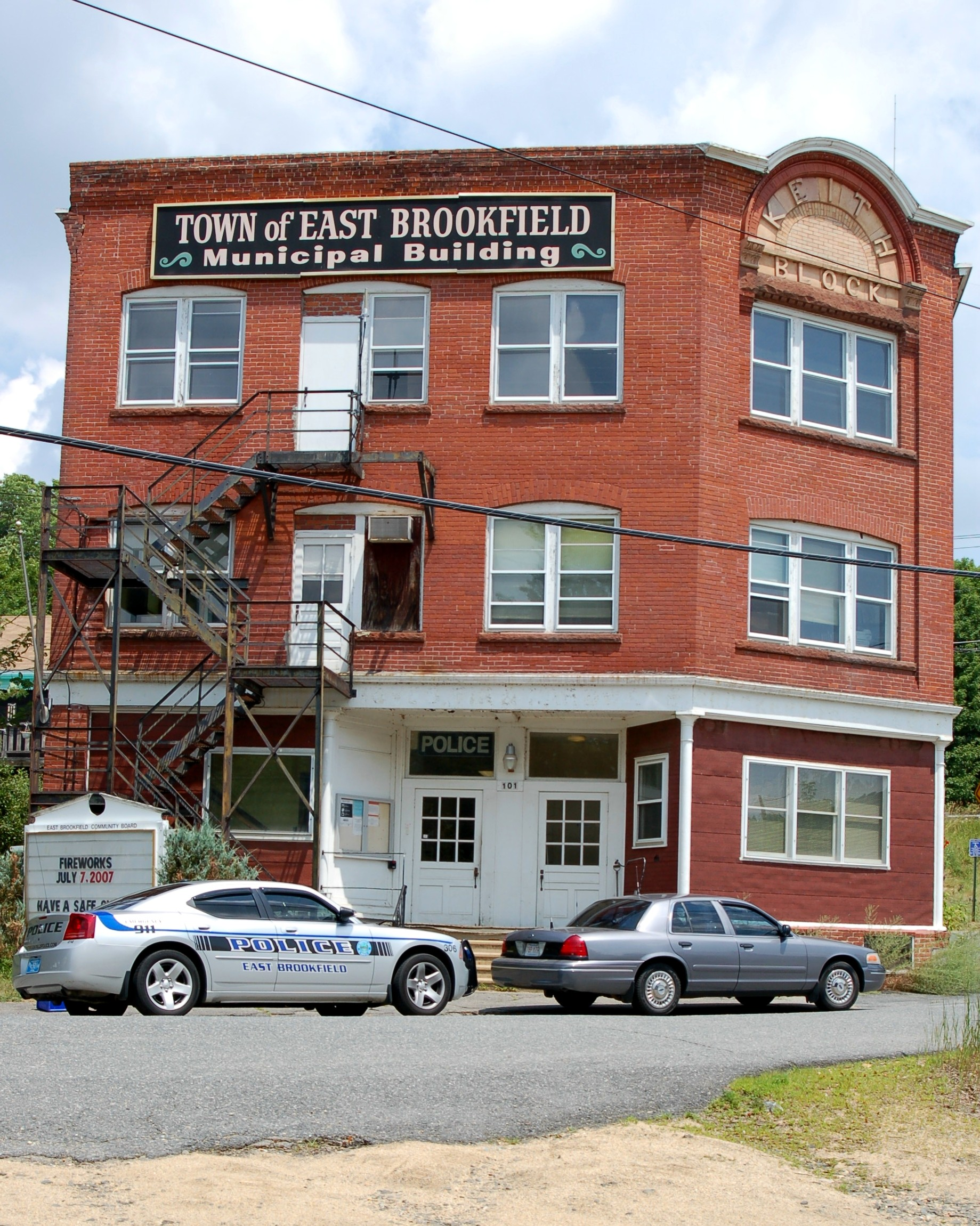
- The Keith Block, formerly the East Brookfield Municipal Building

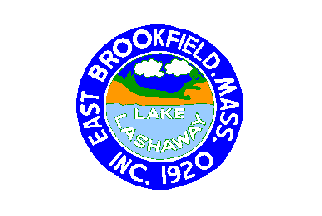
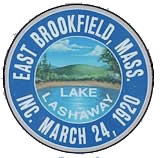
- Flag Seal

- Location in Worcester County and the state of Massachusetts.
- Coordinates: 42°13′40″N 72°02′50″W
- Country: United States
- State: Massachusetts
- County: Worcester
- Settled: 1664
- Incorporated: 1920

Government
  - Type: Open town meeting
  - Town Secretary: Deborah A. Morgan

Area
  - Total: 10.4 sq mi (26.9 km^{2})
  - Land: 9.8 sq mi (25.5 km^{2})
  - Water: 0.54 sq mi (1.4 km^{2})
- Elevation: 620 ft (189 m)

Population (2020)
  - Total: 2,224
  - Density: 226/sq mi (87.2/km^{2})
- Time zone: UTC-5 (Eastern)
  - Summer (DST): UTC-4 (Eastern)
- ZIP code: 01515
- Area code: 508 / 774
- FIPS code: 25-18560
- GNIS feature ID: 0618362
- Website: www.eastbrookfieldma.us

East Brookfield is a town in Worcester County, Massachusetts, United States. The population was 2,224 at the 2020 United States Census. The census-designated place of East Brookfield (CDP) is located in the town.

== History ==
East Brookfield was first settled by Europeans in 1664 as part of the Quaboag Plantation lands. It became part of the new town of Brookfield in 1673, and was officially incorporated as a separate town in on March 24, 1920, making it the newest town (by date of incorporation) in Massachusetts.

== Geography ==
According to the United States Census Bureau, the town has a total area of 10.4 square miles (27 km^{2}), of which 9.8 square miles (25 km^{2}) is land and 0.5 square miles (1.3 km^{2}), or 5.11%, is water. East Brookfield is bordered on the north by North Brookfield, on the west by Brookfield, on the south by Sturbridge and Charlton, and on the east by Spencer.

Most community life in East Brookfield centers around Route 9, particularly the stretch closest to Lake Lashaway, on the road from Spencer to North Brookfield. Within a block of this stretch are found all of the town's churches, its school and former schools, most of its retail businesses and its current and former municipal office buildings. The latter is on Depot Square, a triangular crossroads near the post office and Redmans Hall, the site of the Senior Center and some town meetings.

West of the town center is the Quaboag River plains, known locally as "the Flats". The CSX Boston-to-Selkirk rail line runs parallel to Main Street through this section. North of Main Street is the town's main water body, Lake Lashaway. Southwest of the town center are the Quaboag and Quacumquasit Ponds (also known as North and South ponds). On Quacumquasit Pond is a YMCA residential summer camp, Camp Frank A. Day. Bordering the ponds, in the geographic center of town, is a sparsely populated marshland.

South of the marshes is sparsely populated woodland, formerly a village called Podunk—today marked only by a small cemetery along Podunk Road near the Sturbridge town line—and a hilly area called High Rocks. During his youth, the vaudeville entertainer George M. Cohan spent his summers with his relatives in Podunk. He loved East Brookfield, and made the term "Podunk" famous, describing it in his comedy acts. Other entertainers started mentioning Podunk, and the word entered the language, standing for any archetypal "backwater" town.

== Demographics ==
Historical population
Year	Pop.	±%
1930	926	—
1940	1,016	+9.7%
1950	1,243	+22.3%
1960	1,533	+23.3%
1970	1,800	+17.4%
1980	1,955	+8.6%
1990	2,033	+4.0%
2000	2,097	+3.1%
2010	2,183	+4.1%
2020	2,224	+1.9%
2022*	2,204	−0.9%
* = population estimate. Source: United States Census records and Population Estimates Program data.

As of the census of 2000, there were 2,097 people, 778 households, and 599 families residing in the town. The population density was 213.0 inhabitants per square mile (82.2/km^{2}). There were 849 housing units at an average density of 86.2 per square mile (33.3/km^{2}). The racial makeup of the town was 98.52% White, 0.43% Black or African American, 0.24% Native American, 0.14% Asian, 0.14% from other races, and 0.52% from two or more races. Hispanic or Latino of any race were 0.76% of the population.

There were 778 households, out of which 32.6% had children under the age of 18 living with them, 65.7% were married couples living together, 8.2% had a female householder with no husband present, and 22.9% were non-families. 18.9% of all households were made up of individuals, and 9.6% had someone living alone who was 65 years of age or older. The average household size was 2.70 and the average family size was 3.07.

In the town, the population was spread out, with 25.6% under the age of 18, 6.3% from 18 to 24, 30.0% from 25 to 44, 24.7% from 45 to 64, and 13.3% who were 65 years of age or older. The median age was 39 years. For every 100 females, there were 98.8 males. For every 100 females age 18 and over, there were 96.2 males.

The median income for a household in the town was $51,860, and the median income for a family was $57,500. Males had a median income of $41,739 versus $28,250 for females. The per capita income for the town was $22,629. About 2.8% of families and 3.9% of the population were below the poverty line, including 3.6% of those under age 18 and 9.2% of those age 65 or over.

== Library ==
The East Brookfield public library was established in 1921. In fiscal year 2008, the town of East Brookfield spent 1.78% ($64,839) of its budget on its public library—approximately $31 per person.

== Education ==
State government
State Representative(s):	Donnie Berthiaume (R)
State Senator(s):	Anne M. Gobi (D)
Governor's Councilor(s):	Jen Caissie (R)
Federal government
U.S. Representative(s):	Richard E. Neal (D-1st District),
U.S. Senators:	Elizabeth Warren (D), Ed Markey (D)

There is one active school in town. It is East Brookfield Elementary School. In 2002, they closed down two older schools, Lashaway Junior High School (built in 1882, also known as the Hodgkins School), which at the time of closing served grades 3–6, and the Memorial School, built in 1952. East Brookfield is regionalized K–12 with Spencer, and East Brookfield students also attend Knox Trail Junior High School (grades 7–8) and David Prouty High School (grades 9–12) in Spencer.

== Points of interest ==
The Hodgkins School, also known as the Lashaway Junior High, was at the time of its closing in 2002 the oldest operating original, wooden school building in the nation. It is now the home of the East Brookfield Historical Museum, the Quaboag Valley Railroaders Club, and the Massasoit Art Guild. It is also the meeting place for Boy Scout Troop 238.

== Notable people ==
- Anna Brackett, philosopher and educator, who taught school in East Brookfield
- Connie Mack, baseball player, manager and long time owner of Philadelphia A's
- Charles Thurber, inventor
