= Quaboag River =

River in Massachusetts, United States

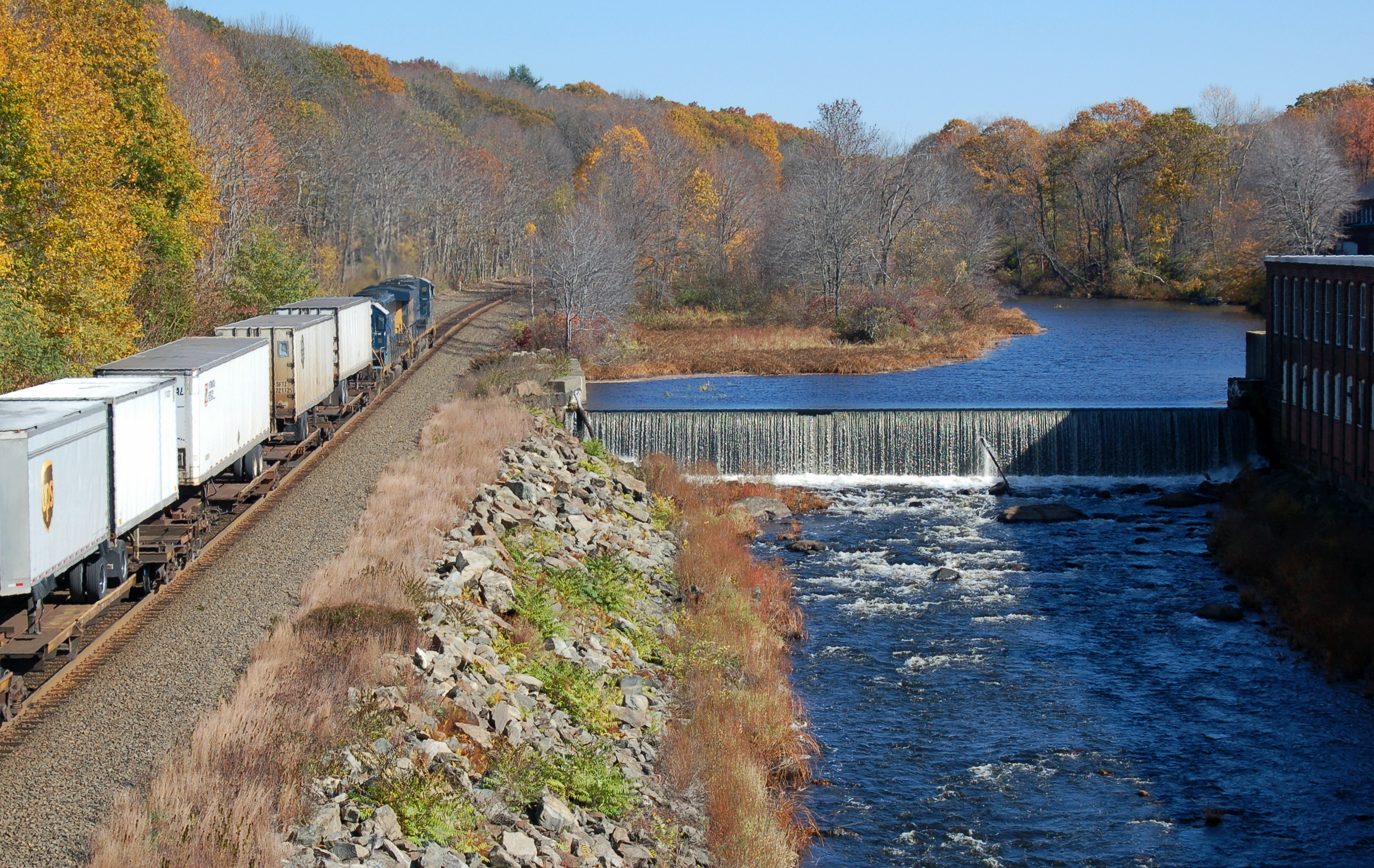
- Quaboag River at Warren

Physical characteristics
- Source
  - location: Quaboag Pond
  - coordinates: 42°11′45″N 72°04′13″W
  - elevation: 594 feet (181 m)
- Mouth
  - location: Three Rivers, Massachusetts
  - coordinates: 42°10′50″N 72°21′54″W
  - elevation: 290 feet (88 m)
- Length: 25.7 mi (41.4 km)
- Basin size: 150 mi^{2} (390 km^{2})
- Discharge
  - average: 132 cu ft/s (3.7 m^{3}/s)

The Quaboag River is a 25.7-mile-long (41.4 km) river in Massachusetts that heads at Quaboag Pond in Brookfield at an elevation of 594 feet (181 m) above sea level. It flows west to the village of Three Rivers, Massachusetts, at an elevation of 290 feet (88 m).

== History ==
The river receives its name from Quaboag Pond, an Indian name meaning "red-water" (place or pond). At one time, this pond was called Podunk Pond. Early industry started along the Quaboag River downstream from West Brookfield, where the river started a 300-foot (91 m) change in elevation, providing significant waterpower. Major heavy industry was located in Warren, Massachusetts, because of the available waterpower from the river. Many of the dams on the river, used to provide waterpower, were destroyed during floods and not repaired or replaced. Parts of them remain, providing a hint of the river’s industrial past.

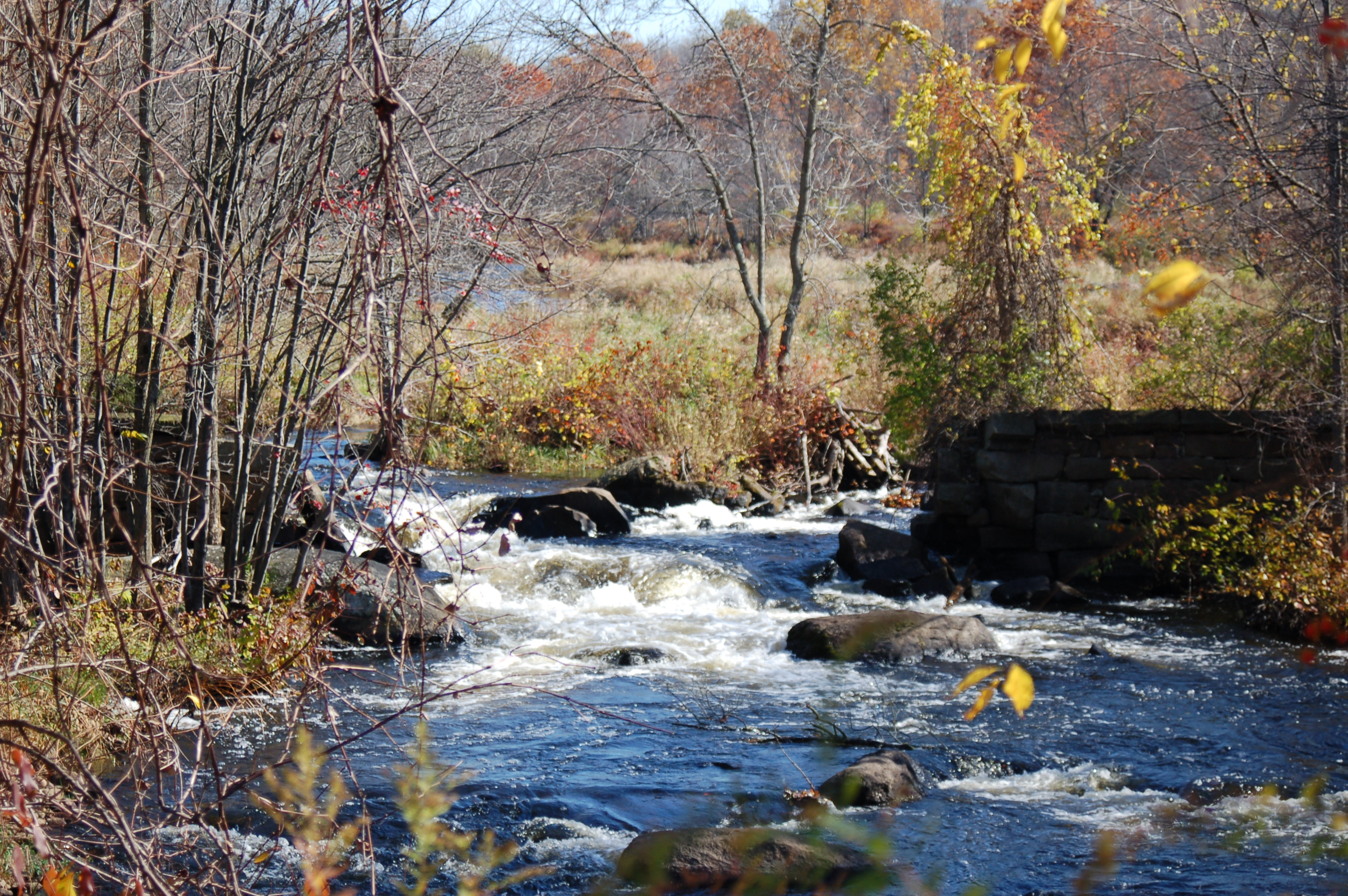
Broken dam on the Quaboag River

== Description ==
The Quaboag River heads at Quaboag Pond, flows through the towns of Brookfield, West Brookfield (where Lake Wickaboag drains into it), and Warren before joining the Ware River and Swift River in Three Rivers, to form the Chicopee River. This river is therefore part of the Chicopee River Watershed.

== Watershed ==
Numerous local brooks and streams from the towns of East Brookfield, Brookfield, West Brookfield, and Warren drain the watershed into the Quaboag River. Lake Lashaway in East Brookfield drains into Quaboag Pond, and several other significant water sources drain into it. There are also several wetlands associated with this watershed, the two major ones being the Great Swamp south of Brookfield, and the Allen Swamp south of East Brookfield.

== Recreational use ==
Whitewater kayakers and canoeists paddle the Quaboag from a put-in at Lucy Stone Park in Warren, downstream to a take-out along Route 67. The river is Class III and features several named rapids, Mousehole and Trestle Rapid above the dam, and, downstream, Angel's Field and Devil's Gorge, which contains an abrupt four-foot waterfall called Quaboag Drop. The river has a large watershed, holds its water well (is well formed), and is runnable at levels above four feet on the Brimfield USGS gauge. It contains one mandatory portage around an unrunnable dam next to a factory. This dam is shown in the title block.

== Coordinates ==
- 42°10′50″N 72°21′54″W Mouth in Three Rivers
- 42°12′47″N 72°11′43″W Passage through Warren
- 42°11′45″N 72°04′13″W Head south of East Brookfield

== See also ==
- List of rivers of Massachusetts
