= Eugene C. Gardner =

American architect

Eugene Clarence Gardner
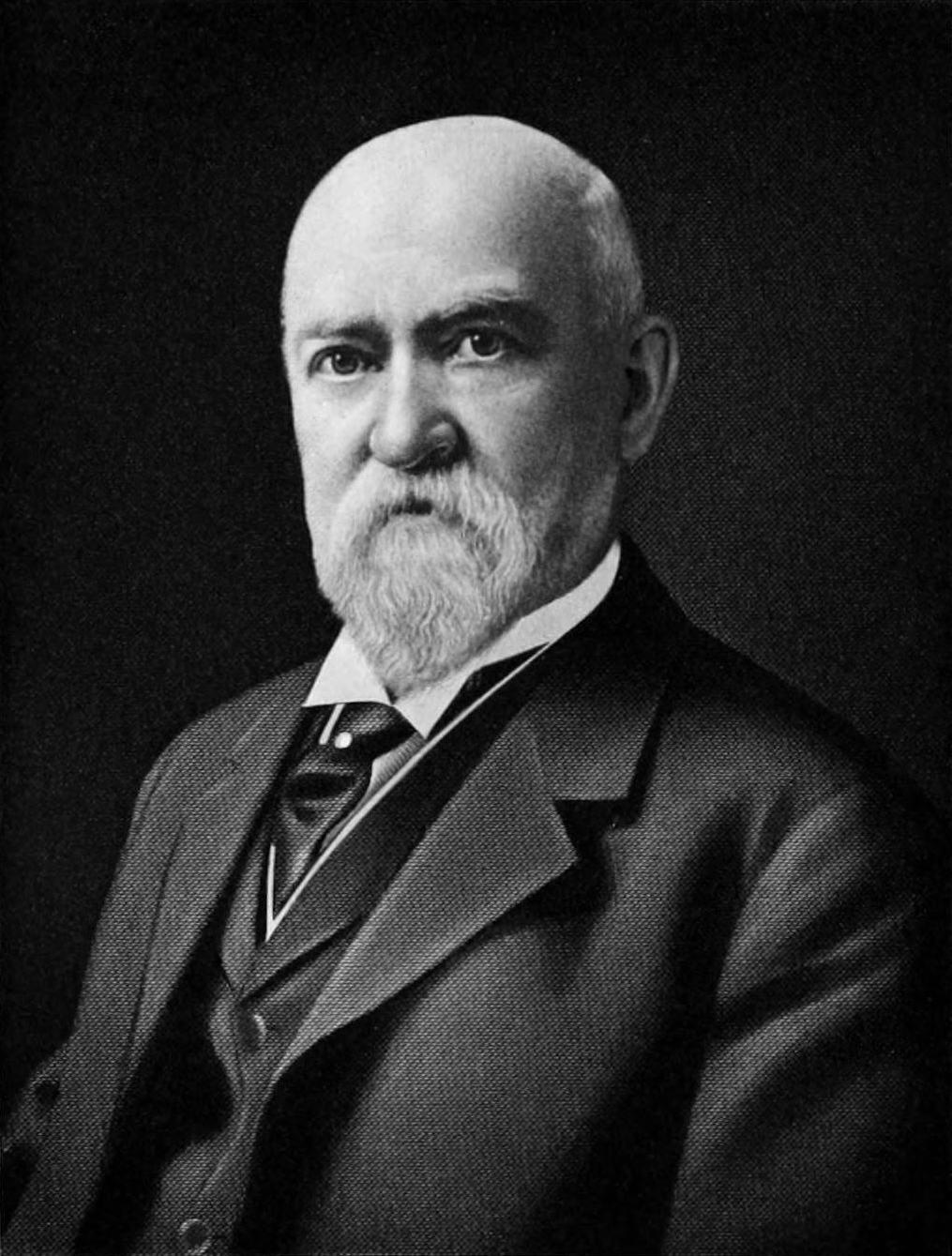
- Eugene C. Gardner
- Born: March 28, 1836; Ashfield, Massachusetts
- Died: February 7, 1915 (aged 78); Springfield, Massachusetts
- Occupation: Architect

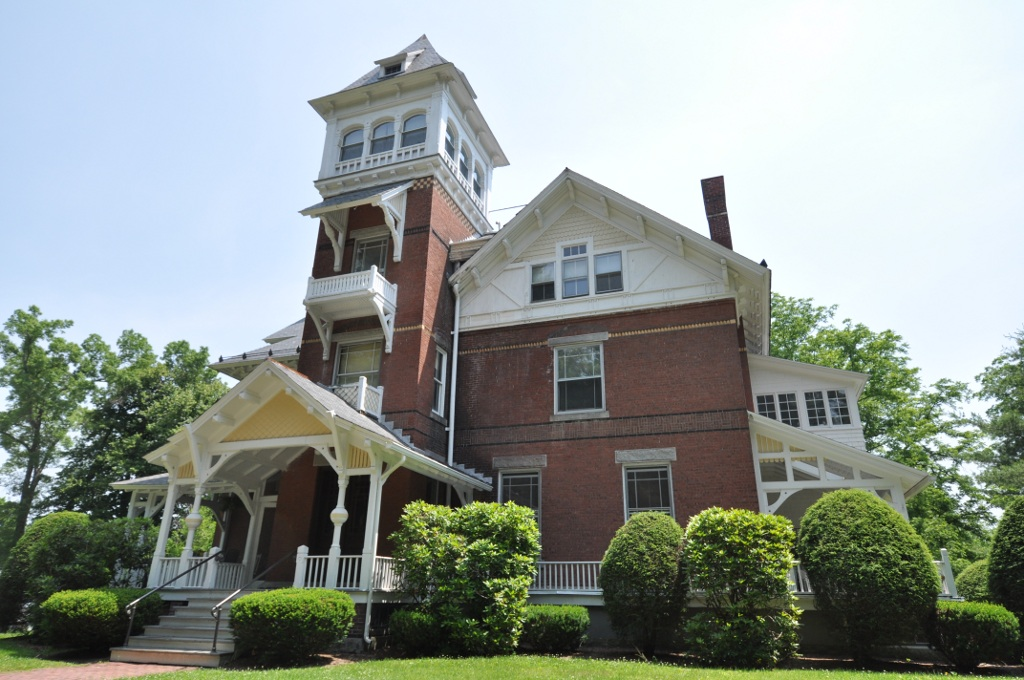
Grove Hill in Leeds, Massachusetts, designed by E. C. Gardner in 1879.

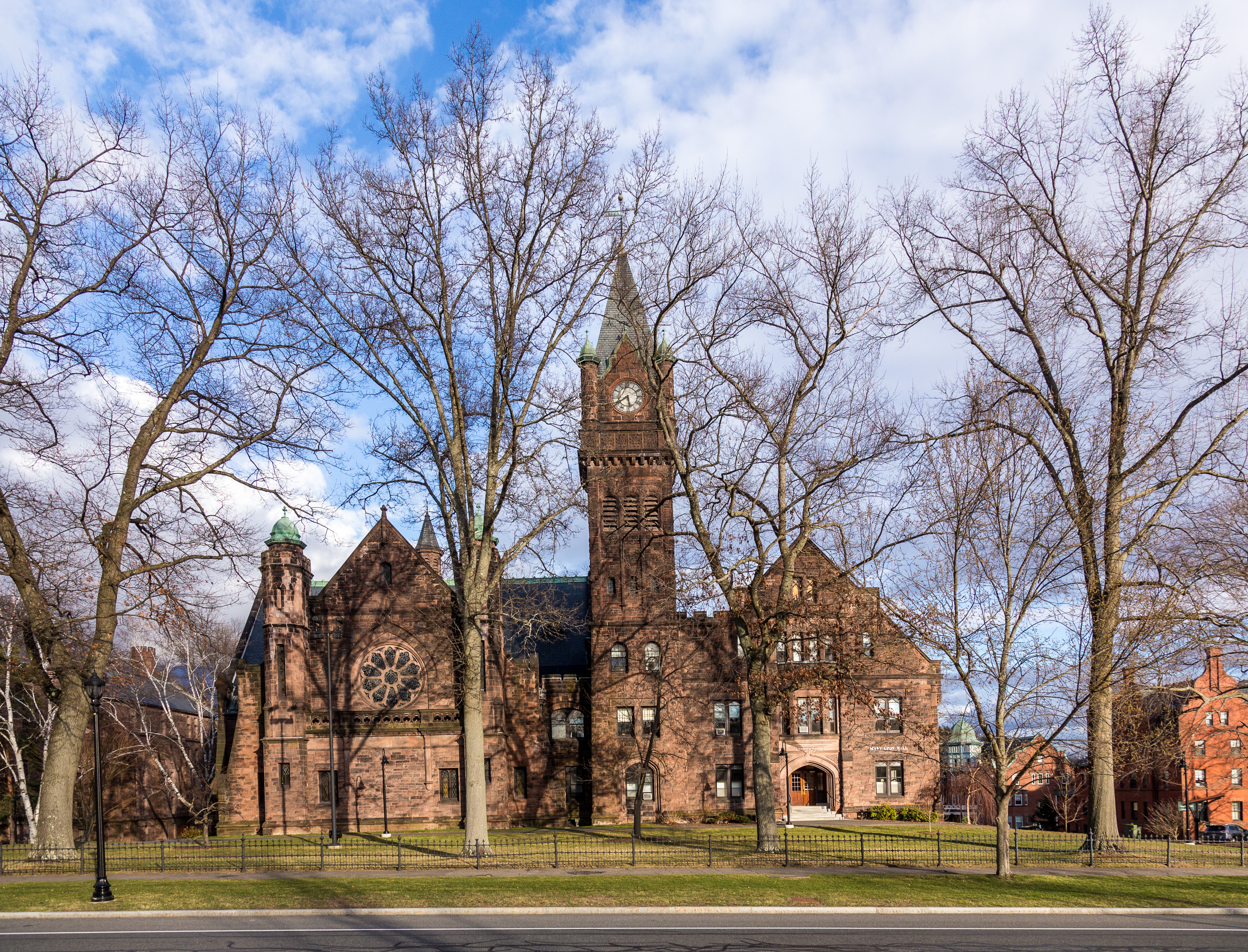
Mary Lyon Hall at Mount Holyoke College in South Hadley, Massachusetts, designed by Gardner, Pyne & Gardner in 1897.

Eugene Clarence Gardner (1836–1915) was an American architect and author of Springfield, Massachusetts. Gardner was noted both for the architectural influence of his extensive practice as well as his writings on the American home. Gardner was the most notable architect of Springfield.

== Life and career ==
Eugene Clarence Gardner was born March 28, 1836, in Ashfield, Massachusetts to Bela Gardner and Lucy (Barber) Gardner. He was raised on the family farm, and attended district schools as well as the Ashfield and Conway Academies. He learned the trade of mason and worked for some time in New Ipswich, New Hampshire, before moving to Florence, where his family had moved in his absence. In 1858 Gardner married and moved west, and was appointed principal of Tallmadge Academy in Tallmadge, Ohio. In 1859, while principal, he oversaw the construction of a new building for the academy. In 1862, he returned to Florence, and the following year opened an architect's office in Northampton. Perhaps facing competition from established architect William Fenno Pratt, in 1868 he moved downriver to Springfield, where he formed a partnership with contractor-turned-architect Jason Perkins, also a former resident of Northampton. The firm of Perkins & Gardner was dissolved in 1873, and both returned to private practice.

Gardner worked independently until 1888, when he formed a partnership with his son, George C. Gardner, and draftsman George R. Pyne, practicing as Gardner, Pyne & Gardner. In the winter of 1888–89 Gardner moved to Washington, D.C. in hopes to improve his ailing health. From Washington he went to Europe, returning to the United States to spend the winter of 1889–90 in Atlanta. Both times, Gardner acted as representative of his firm and they were commissioned to design major projects in these cities. The partnership of Gardner, Pyne & Gardner lasted until 1901, when Pyne left to open an independent office. Father and son formed a new partnership, practicing as E. C. & G. C. Gardner. This partnership continued until Gardner's death in 1915. The firm was then continued by his son, George C. Gardner, as well as their associate, F. W. S. King. The office remained open until King's death in 1940.

== Mill River Flood of 1874 ==
In 1865 Gardner was appointed superintendent of construction of a new mill dam being built on the Mill River above Williamsburg. Gardner was often absent from the site due to illness and construction was usually supervised by the owners, one of whom had designed the dam. The dam was completed in 1866, but had been poorly designed and built. In 1874 it failed catastrophically, and the resulting flood killed 139 people. Following an investigation, the conception and construction of the dam was found to be fraught with incompetence and negligence, but no one person could be assigned the blame.

== As designer and author ==
Gardner always made a point to stay abreast of contemporary architectural fashion. For the First Congregational Church of West Springfield, completed in 1872, Gardner used as a model H. H. Richardson's Church of the Unity in Springfield. Henry-Russell Hitchcock noted that although crude, it represents one of the earliest pieces of evidence of Richardson's influence. Vincent Scully noted Gardner as an important figure in the development of the Stick Style, in such a way that revived the ideas of Andrew Jackson Downing. After the 1880s, likely due to the influence of the academically trained George C. Gardner, the firm's designs were chiefly derived from Colonial and Renaissance precedents.

Beyond his own buildings, Gardner is known as the author of a number of influential books on the design and construction of homes. Beginning with Homes, and How to Make Them (1874) and ending with The House that Jill Built (1882, reissued 1896), Gardner promoted a highly personal and considered design process for homes. In Space, Time and Architecture, Sigfried Giedion noted that Gardner's writings represented a move away from the fussiness that then typified American architecture to a more considered whole.

Gardner was also a frequent contributor to The Republican and the architectural press. Additionally, from its establishment in 1883 Gardner was editor of a short-lived monthly architectural journal, The Builder, published by Clark W. Bryan & Company.

== Political and personal life ==
In 1901 Gardner was elected a member of the Massachusetts House of Representatives from the 3rd Hampden district as a Republican, but declined to run for a second term. He was a major proponent of the development and beautification of Springfield, and in 1905 proposed a plan for the development of the city along City Beautiful principles. Some of his proposals, like the development of Court Square and construction of the Memorial Bridge, were eventually brought to fruition, but others, including the development of a park and boulevard system, were not.

Gardner married in 1858, to Harriet Bellows Hubbard of Ashfield, Massachusetts. In addition to their son, they had a daughter who died young. The Gardner family lived in a house on Atwater Road near Atwater Park, built in 1874 and now demolished. In the 1870s they were host to several students of the Chinese Educational Mission, including Tang Shaoyi and Liang Ju-hao, who would become officials of the Republic of China.

In 1898, the Gardners and Pyne were among the founding members of the Architectural Club of Springfield, though this organization was not long-lived. Gardner became a member of the American Institute of Architects in 1913.

== Partners and associates ==
George Clarence Gardner
- Born: August 3, 1865; Florence, Massachusetts
- Died: August 27, 1930 (aged 65); Damariscotta, Maine
- Occupation: Architect

George Rovillo Pyne
- Born: February 12, 1853; Waterbury, Connecticut
- Died: February 18, 1911 (aged 58); Springfield, Massachusetts
- Occupation: Architect

Frank Wesley Stetson King
- Born: March 5, 1870; Springfield, Massachusetts
- Died: July 15, 1940 (aged 70); Springfield, Massachusetts
- Occupation: Architect

=== George C. Gardner ===
George Clarence Gardner was born August 3, 1865, in Florence. He attended the Springfield public schools before enrolling at the Massachusetts Institute of Technology, taking courses in 1885–86 and 1888. In addition to his formal architectural education, he worked as a student draftsman in his father's office before becoming partner after his final return to Springfield in 1888. Gardner was considered an expert on Colonial architecture and remodeled several Colonial churches. He was chairman of the Springfield Planning Board from its establishment in 1921 until his death in 1930.

Gardner became a member of the American Institute of Architects in 1902.

The younger Gardner died August 27, 1930, at the age of 64.

=== George R. Pyne ===
George Rovillo Pyne was born February 12, 1853, in Waterbury, Connecticut. He was educated in the schools of South Hadley and Agawam, and in 1873 went to Boston as a student draftsman, working for Putnam & Tilden and George F. Meacham. In 1876 he came back to Springfield, where he entered Gardner's employ. From 1881 to 1886 he practiced architecture in Evansville, Indiana, returning to Springfield at the end of that period. When the partnership of Gardner, Pyne & Gardner was formed, Pyne moved to Washington as the elder Gardner's assistant, returning to Springfield by 1890. After the dissolution of the partnership in 1901, Pyne practiced on his own in Springfield for ten years. He died February 18, 1911, in Springfield.

=== F. W. S. King ===
After the death of George C. Gardner, the firm was taken over by Frank Wesley Stetson King. Usually known as F. W. S. or Frank, King was born March 5, 1870, in Springfield and entered the Gardner office in the 1890s after completing his education in the public schools. For a few years after the breakup of Gardner, Pyne & Gardner, King operated his own practice, but soon returned to the Gardners. By 1913, he was the firm's main construction superintendent. King continued to practice as E. C. & G. C. Gardner, changing the name to Gardner & King in 1937. He continued to practice until his death, which occurred on July 19, 1940, in Springfield.

King was a founding member and first vice president of the Architectural Society of Western Massachusetts, established in 1934 and later merged into the American Institute of Architects.

The last major work of the firm was the Springfield Trade High School, completed in 1939 and demolished in 2012.

== Legacy ==
In addition to his architecture, Gardner left another legacy in Springfield. Many architects who would go on to practice in Springfield and elsewhere were trained in his office, including Guy Kirkham, Frederick S. Newman, Francis R. Richmond and B. Hammett Seabury. Walter T. Owen, who designed the George Walter Vincent Smith Art Museum in Springfield and would later succeed to the practice of James Renwick Jr. in New York, also worked with Gardner.

Many of Gardner's works, designed alone or with partners, have been listed on the United States National Register of Historic Places, and others contribute to listed historic districts.

== Architectural works (Note: Projects dated from 1863 are credited to E. C. Gardner, from 1868 to Perkins & Gardner, from 1873 to E. C. Gardner, from 1888 to Gardner, Pyne & Gardner, from 1901 to E. C. & G. C. Gardner and from 1937 to Gardner & King.) ==
- Factory for the International Screw Nail Company, Bay State Village, Massachusetts (1866)
- Mill for the Florence Manufacturing Company, Florence, Massachusetts (1866)
- House for William L. Wilcox, Springfield, Massachusetts (1870–71)
- Fitzgerald's Stearns Square Block, Springfield, Massachusetts (1871, NRHP 1983, demolished)
- First Congregational Church, West Springfield, Massachusetts (1872)
- Parish house, First Church of Christ, Congregational, Springfield, Massachusetts (1872–74)
- Powers Block and Wason Building, (Note: The Gardner offices were in the Wason Building, 33 Lyman Street, from 1889 until 1940.) Springfield, Massachusetts (1873, 1881 and 1911, NRHP 1979)
- Opera House Block, Turners Falls, Massachusetts (1874)
- Chinese Educational Mission Building, Hartford, Connecticut (1877, demolished)
- Brimfield Town Hall, Brimfield, Massachusetts (1878)
- "Grove Hill" for Lucius Dimock, (Note: Dimock was owner of the Nonotuck Silk Company.) Leeds, Massachusetts (1879)
- House for George P. Dickinson, Northampton, Massachusetts (1879)
- "Stonecrest" for Francis L. Underhill, Bedford Corners, New York (1879, NRHP 2004)
- Arms Academy (former), (Note: Now home to the Shelburne Historical Society.) Shelburne Falls, Massachusetts (1880)
- Mill for the Nonotuck Silk Company, Leeds, Massachusetts (1880)
- Clarissa C. Cook Home for the Friendless, Davenport, Iowa (1881–82, NRHP 1983)
- Parish house, East Congregational Church (former), Ware, Massachusetts (1881)
- Young Men's Library Association, Ware, Massachusetts (1881)
- Cottage Row, Mount Hermon School, Gill, Massachusetts (1882)
- Boston and Albany Railroad Depot (former), (Note: Presently the Quaboag Historical Society Museum.) West Brookfield, Massachusetts (1884)
- House for Frances M. Lincoln, Worcester, Massachusetts (1884)
- House for Julius H. Appleton, Springfield, Massachusetts (1886)
- Springfield City Hospital, Springfield, Massachusetts (1887–89, demolished)
- Henderson Castle for John Brooks and Mary Foote Henderson, Washington, D.C. (1888–89, Demolished 1949)
- Buckland Public Library, Buckland, Massachusetts (1890)
- Remodeling of the East Congregational Church, (Note: Remodeling of a Federal church, built in 1826 to a design by Isaac Damon. The interior was rebuilt and the exterior elaborated.) Ware, Massachusetts (1890, burned 1925)
- Grady Hospital (former), Atlanta, Georgia (1890–92, NRHP 1981)
- Holyoke City Hospital, Holyoke, Massachusetts (1891)
- Backus Hospital, Norwich, Connecticut (1893, demolished)
- Carew Street School, Springfield, Massachusetts (1893–94 and 1918, demolished)
- Springfield Armory (former), (Note: As supervising architects to Wait & Cutter of Boston. Partially destroyed in the 2011 New England tornado outbreak, later restored as part of MGM Springfield.) Springfield, Massachusetts (1894–95, NRHP 1976)
- Noble Hospital, Westfield, Massachusetts (1895–96, demolished)
- Northampton High School (former), Northampton, Massachusetts (1895–96)
- Parish house, First Congregational Church, Adams, Massachusetts (1895)
- Parks Building, Westfield, Massachusetts (1895, burned 1952)
- Stafford Springs House, Stafford Springs, Connecticut (1895–96, burned 1959)
- Worthy Hotel, (Note: In 1909 the adjacent Mayo Building, built in 1896 also to a design by Gardner, Pyne & Gardner, was annexed to the hotel.) Springfield, Massachusetts (1895, NRHP 1983)
- Remodeling of the First Congregational Church, (Note: Remodeling of a Greek Revival church, built 1835-36, in the Colonial Revival style.) Williamsburg, Massachusetts (1897–98)
- Homer Street School, Springfield, Massachusetts (1897–98 and 1924)
- Indian Orchard Fire Station (former), Indian Orchard, Massachusetts (1897)
- Mary Lyon Hall, Mount Holyoke College, South Hadley, Massachusetts (1897)
- Safford Hall, Mount Holyoke College, South Hadley, Massachusetts (1897)
- Trolley barn for the Springfield Street Railway, Springfield, Massachusetts (1897)
- Vernon Street School, Northampton, Massachusetts (1897)
- Ware United Methodist Church (former), Ware, Massachusetts (1897–98)
- Lee Hall, American International College, Springfield, Massachusetts (1898–99)
- Springfield Science Museum, (Note: Expanded to the west in 1931 to a design by Edward Lippincott Tilton and Alfred Morton Githens, the original building faces south.) Springfield, Massachusetts (1898–99)
- Northampton Armory (former), Northampton, Massachusetts (1899–1900)
- State Normal Training School (former), Westfield, Massachusetts (1899-1900, NRHP 1983)
- Hinsdale Town Hall, Hinsdale, New Hampshire (1900)
- Park Street School (former), Palmer, Massachusetts (1900–01)
- Chestnut Street School, Springfield, Massachusetts (1901, 1907–08, 1917 and 1928, burned and demolished 2013)
- Remodeling of the First Congregational Church, (Note: The remodeling of a simple Federal style church, built in 1807-09, expanding the interior and adding an elaborate new facade in the Colonial Revival style, then thought to be more appropriate than the original.) Marietta, Ohio (1901, burned 1905)
- Dickinson Hall, Westfield State University (former campus), Westfield, Massachusetts (1902–03, demolished)
- George H. Gilbert School (former), (Note: Most recently the Hardwick Senior Center.) Gilbertville, Massachusetts (1903)
- Greenfield High School (former), Greenfield, Massachusetts (1903–04)
- House for George E. Rogers, Greenfield, Massachusetts (1903)
- Additions to the Myrtle Street School (former), (Note: The original building, behind the 1903-04 block, was built in 1868 to a design by James M. Currier.) Indian Orchard, Massachusetts (1903–04 and 1914–15, NRHP 1985)
- Springfield Technical High School (former), (Note: The main facade was preserved and incorporated into the new Springfield Data Center.) Springfield, Massachusetts (1904–06, 1924 and 1935, demolished 2003 and 2011)
- St. Paul's United Methodist Church, Ludlow, Massachusetts (1904–05)
- White Street School, Springfield, Massachusetts (1904–05 and 1930–31)
- First Congregational Church, (Note: The replacement church was based on the remodeled 1901 church, but built in brick.) Marietta, Ohio (1905–06)
- Y. W. C. A. Building, Springfield, Massachusetts (1908–09, demolished 2016)
- Lincoln School, Springfield, Massachusetts (1909–10)
- Telephone Building, Springfield, Massachusetts (1909, demolished)
- Hardwick High School (former), (Note: Now the Myron E. Richardson Municipal Building.) Gilbertville, Massachusetts (1910)
- Spaulding Memorial Chapel, Fairview Cemetery, Chicopee, Massachusetts (1910)
- Gilbertville Public Library, Gilbertville, Massachusetts (1911–12)
- Christopher Allen Bridge, Stafford Springs, Connecticut (1912)
- Fidelia Nash Field Gate, Mount Holyoke College, South Hadley, Massachusetts (1912)
- Edisonia Theatre, Springfield, Massachusetts (1913, demolished 2016)
- Remodeling of the Worthington Building, (Note: Originally built in 1872 and enlarged in 1879.) Springfield, Massachusetts (1914, NRHP 1979)
- Drury High School (former), North Adams, Massachusetts (1915–17)
- Remodeling of the First Congregational Church, (Note: A simpler project than the other church remodelings. Built in 1825-26 by associates of Isaac Damon.) Chicopee, Massachusetts (1915–16)
- Converse Street School (former), Longmeadow, Massachusetts (1916)
- Pleasant View School (former), East Longmeadow, Massachusetts (1916)
- Granby Free Public Library (former), Granby, Massachusetts (1917)
- Norway Street School (former), (Note: Now the Willie Ross School for the Deaf.) Longmeadow, Massachusetts (1917)
- Washington School, Springfield, Massachusetts (1917–18 and 1931)
- Liberty School, Springfield, Massachusetts (1918–19 and 1926)
- Borough Elementary School, Stafford Springs, Connecticut (1921)
- East Street School, Ludlow, Massachusetts (1921)
- Warren Memorial Town Hall, Stafford Springs, Connecticut (1922)
- North wing addition, George Walter Vincent Smith Art Museum, Springfield, Massachusetts (1923)
- Terminal Building, Springfield, Massachusetts (1923–24)
- Monson High School (former), (Note: Later the Monson Town Office Building, demolished after suffering damage in the 2011 New England tornado outbreak.) Monson, Massachusetts (1924–25, demolished 2013)
- Taylor Street Fire Station (former), Springfield, Massachusetts (1924)
- Emmanuel Congregational Church, (Note: Now the Harvest Fellowship Church.) Springfield, Massachusetts (1926–27)
- Alumni Hall, Springfield College, Springfield, Massachusetts (1927)
- Springfield District Court, Springfield, Massachusetts (1929–30, NRHP 1983)
- Glenwood School, Springfield, Massachusetts (1930)
- Van Sickle Junior High School, Springfield, Massachusetts (1930–31)
- Franklin County Courthouse, Greenfield, Massachusetts (1931)
- Springfield Trade High School, Springfield, Massachusetts (1939, demolished 2012)

== Gallery of architectural works ==
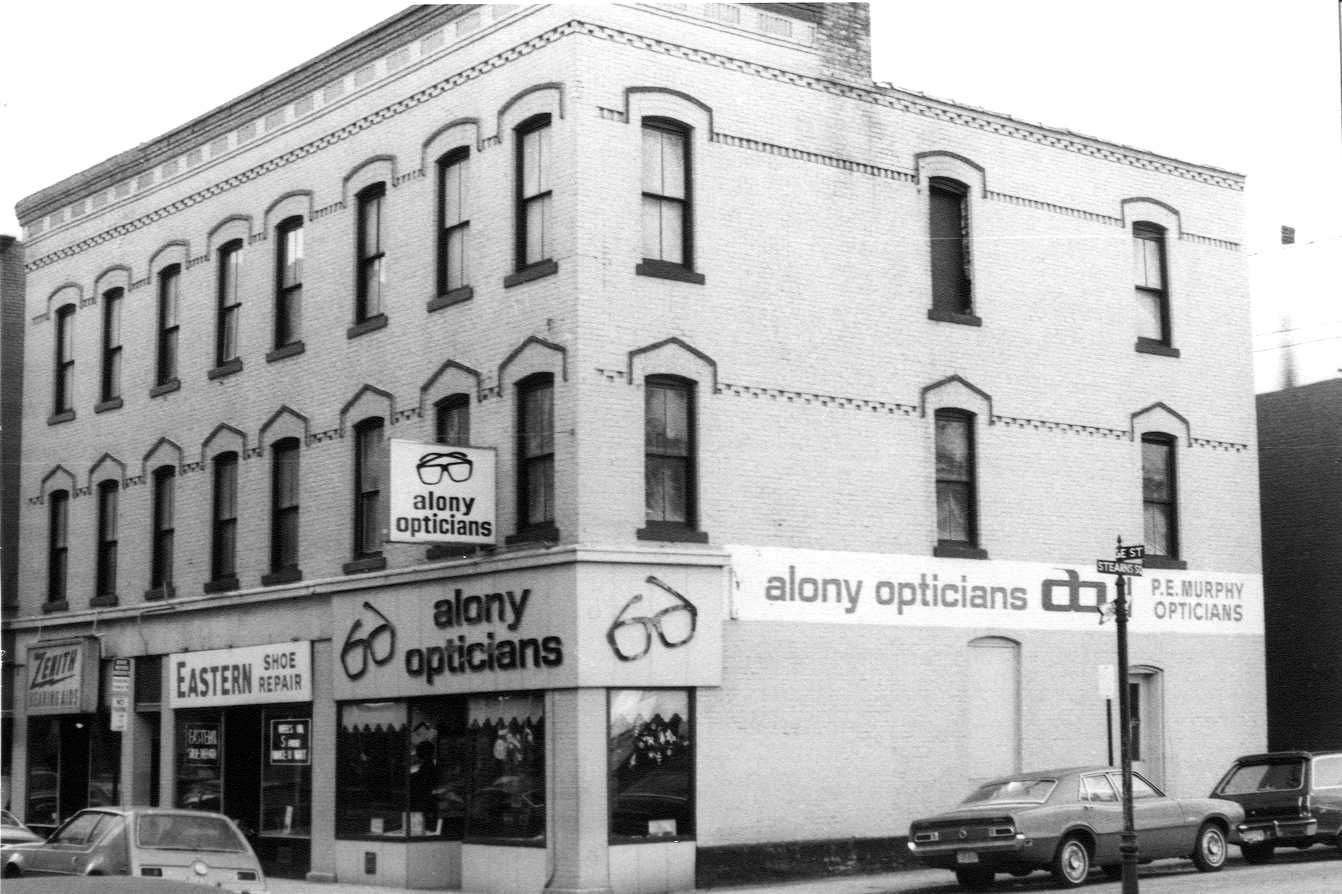
Fitzgerald's Stearns Square Block, Springfield, Massachusetts, 1871.

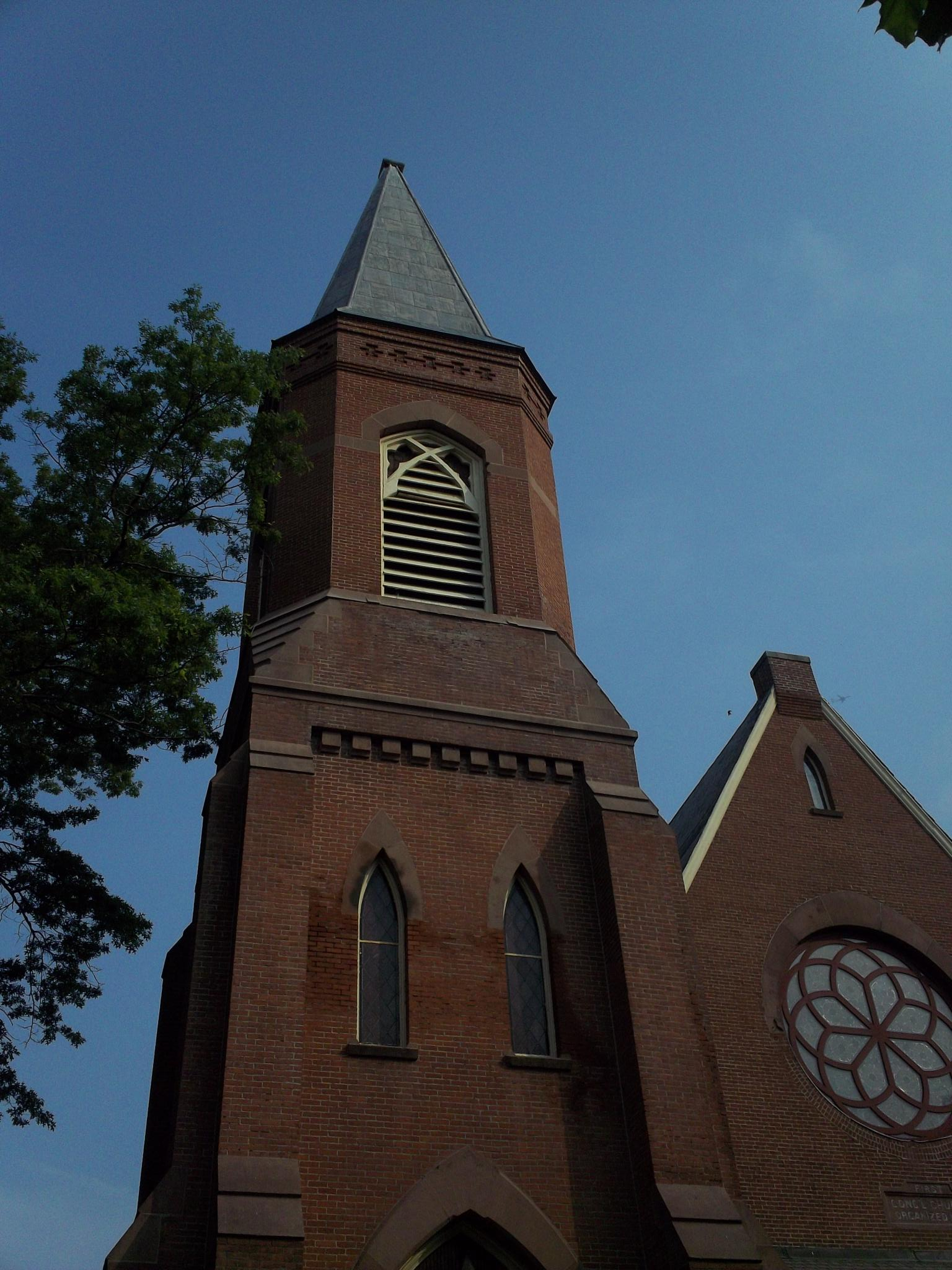
First Congregational Church, West Springfield, Massachusetts, 1872.

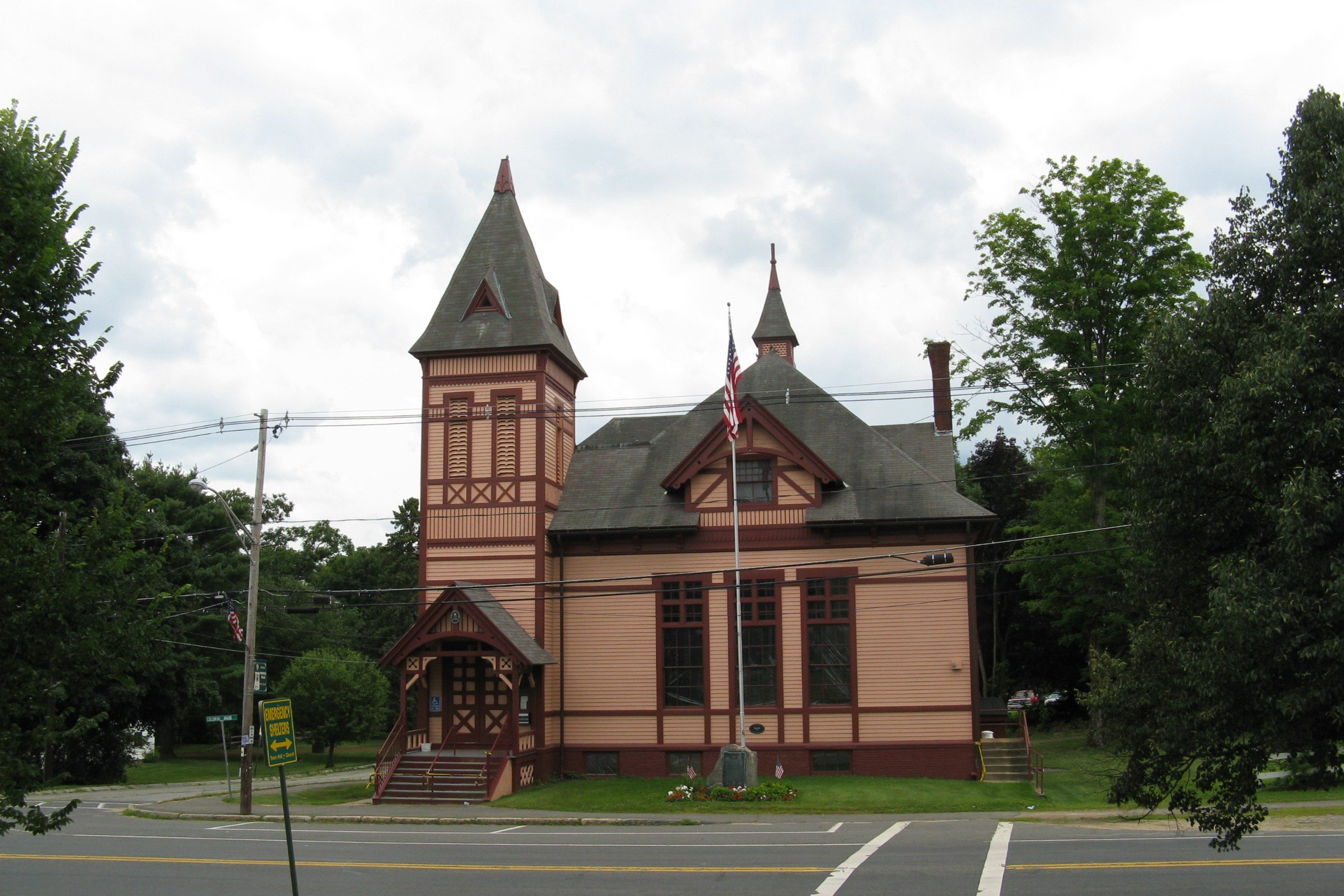
Brimfield Town Hall, Brimfield, Massachusetts, 1878.

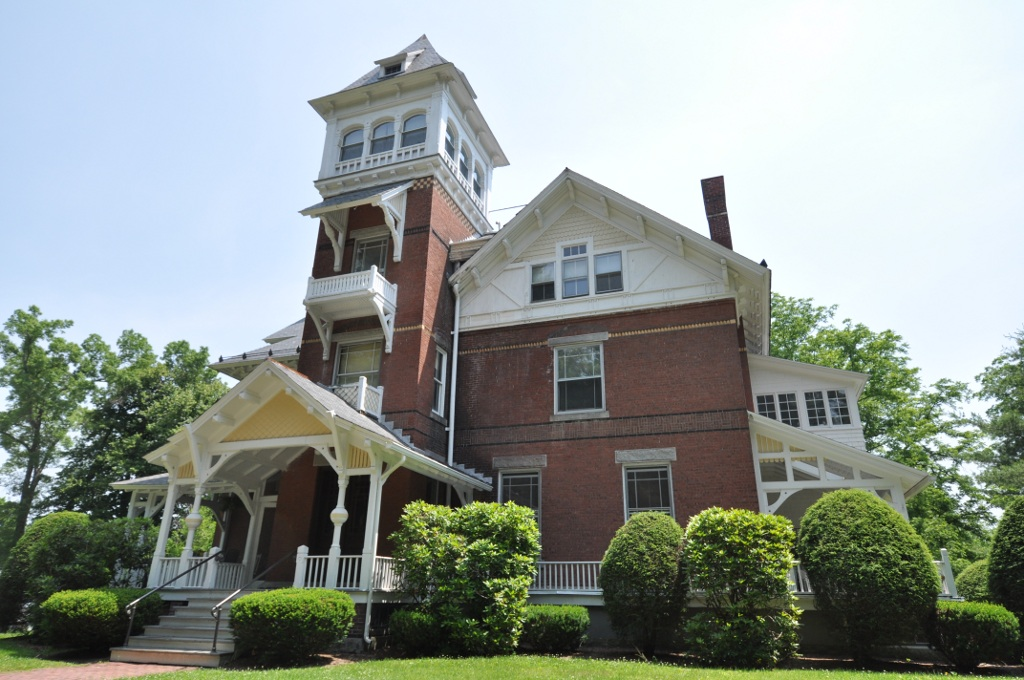
Grove Hill, Leeds, Massachusetts, 1879.

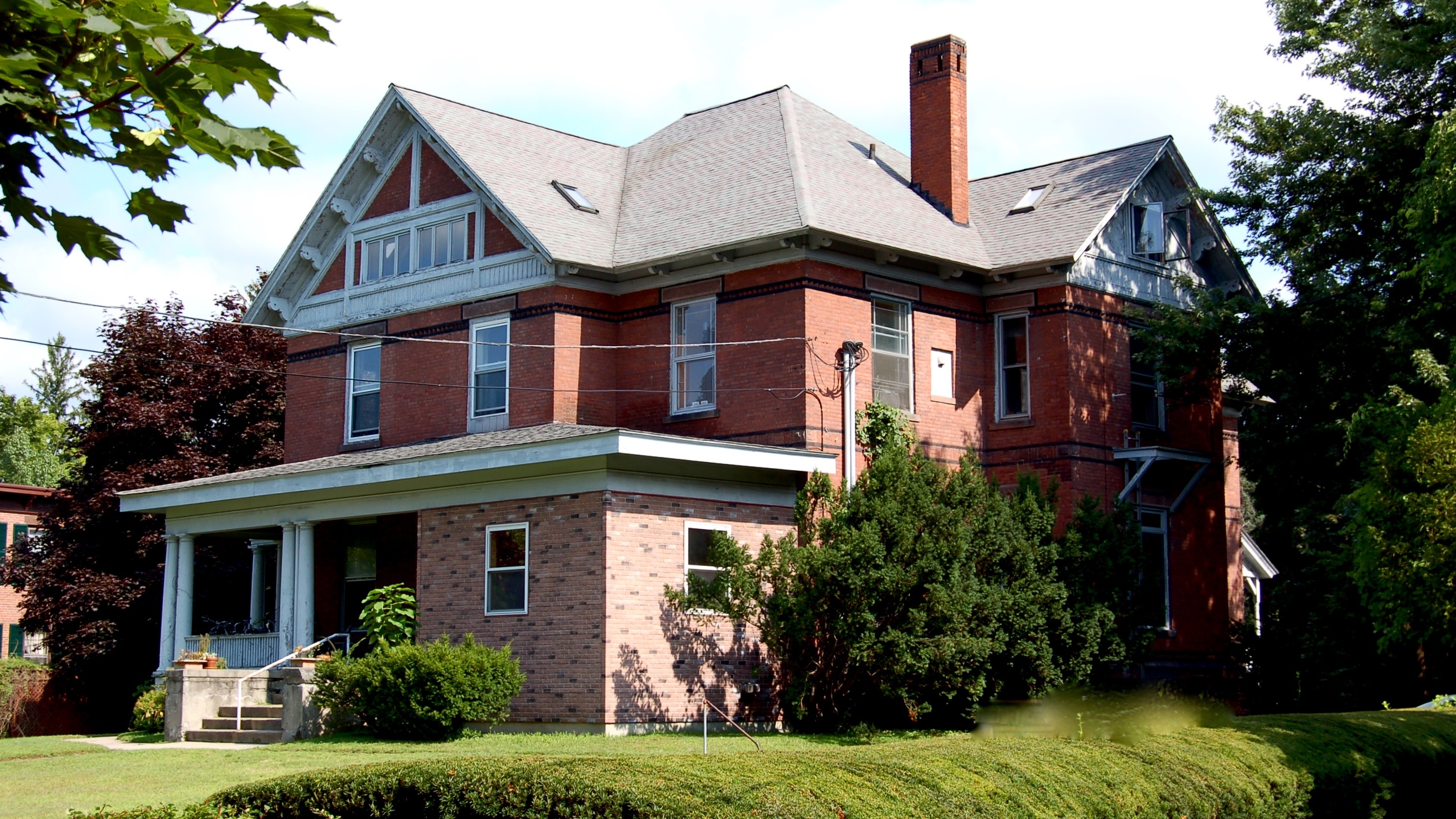
House for George P. Dickinson, Northampton, Massachusetts, 1879.

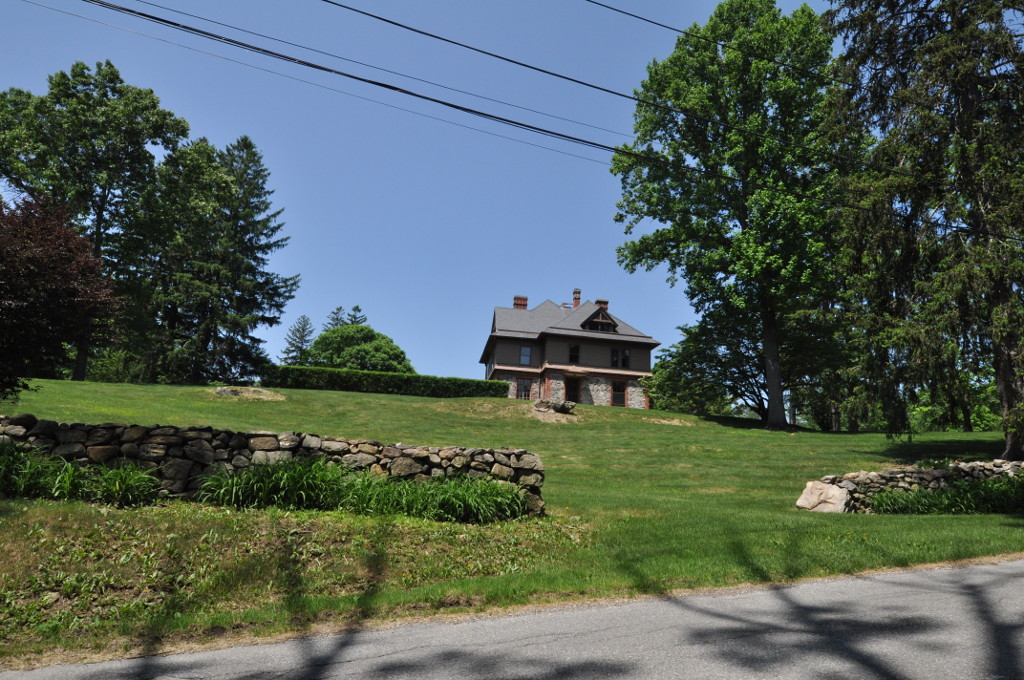
Stonecrest, Bedford Corners, New York, 1879.

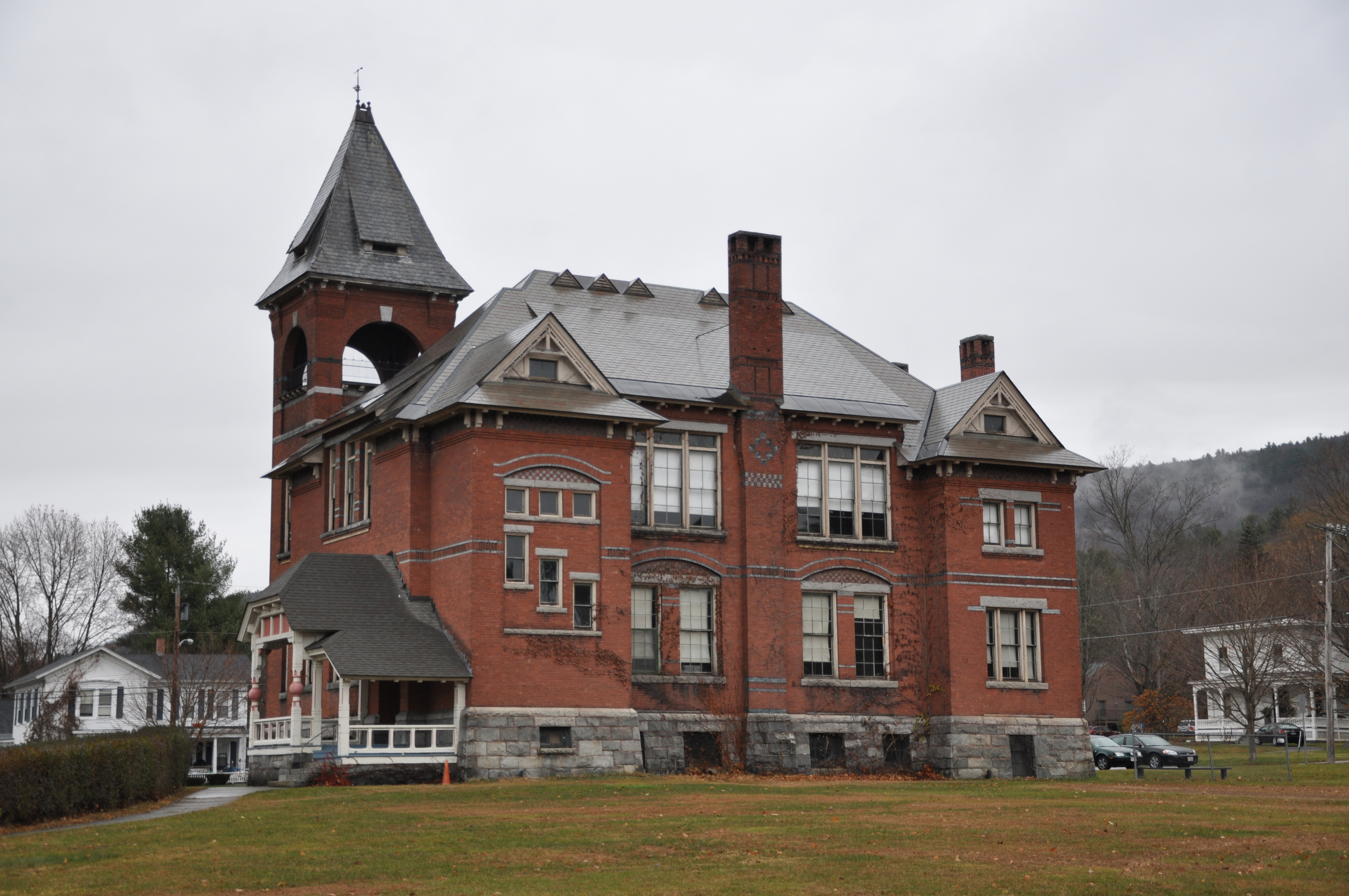
Arms Academy, Shelburne Falls, Massachusetts, 1880.

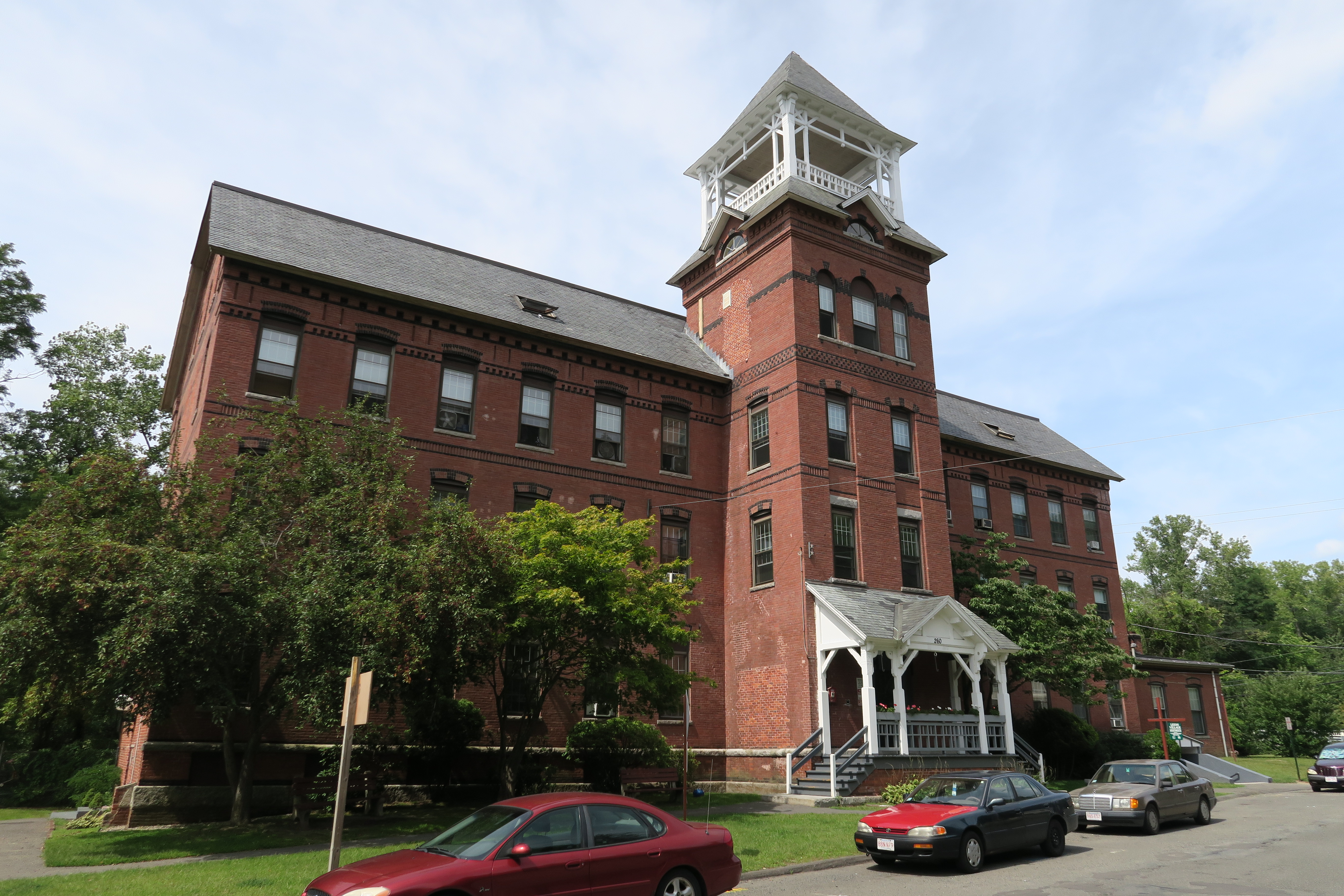
Mill for the Nonotuck Silk Company, Leeds, Massachusetts, 1880.

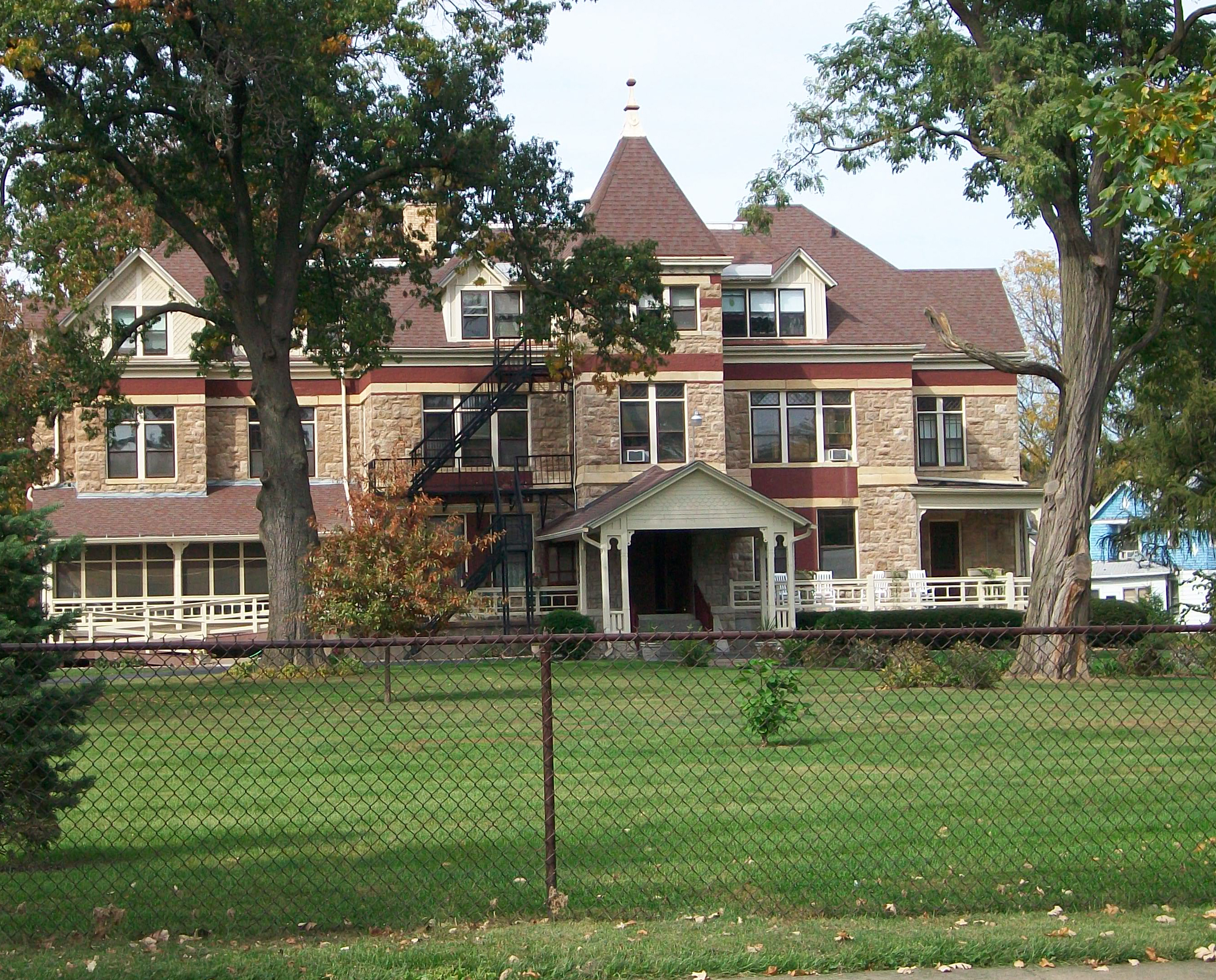
Clarissa C. Cook Home for the Friendless, Davenport, Iowa, 1881-82.

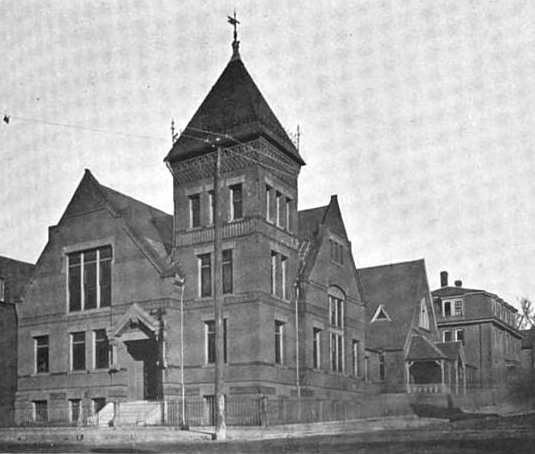
Young Men's Library Association, Ware, Massachusetts, 1881.

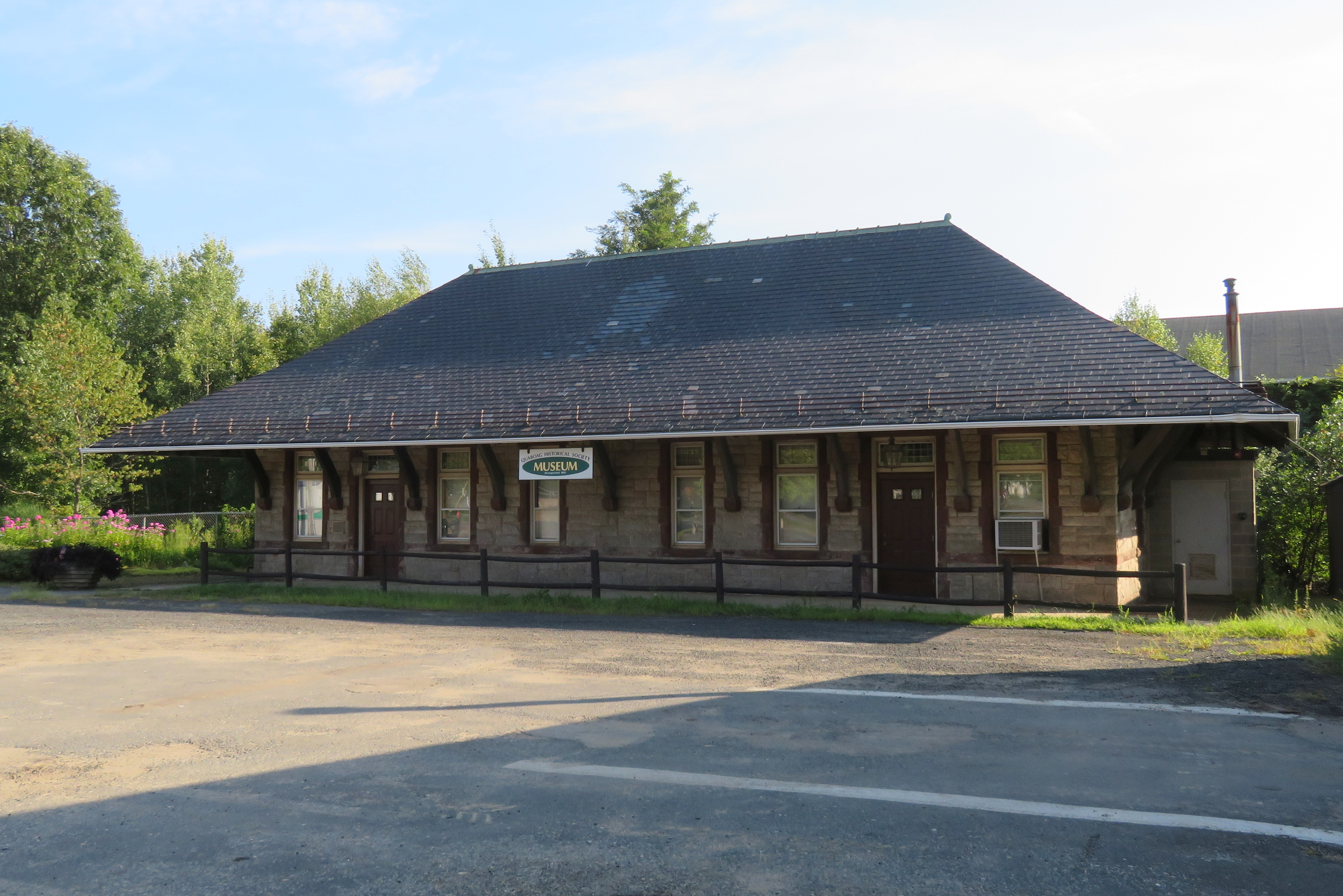
Boston and Albany Railroad Depot, West Brookfield, Massachusetts, 1884.

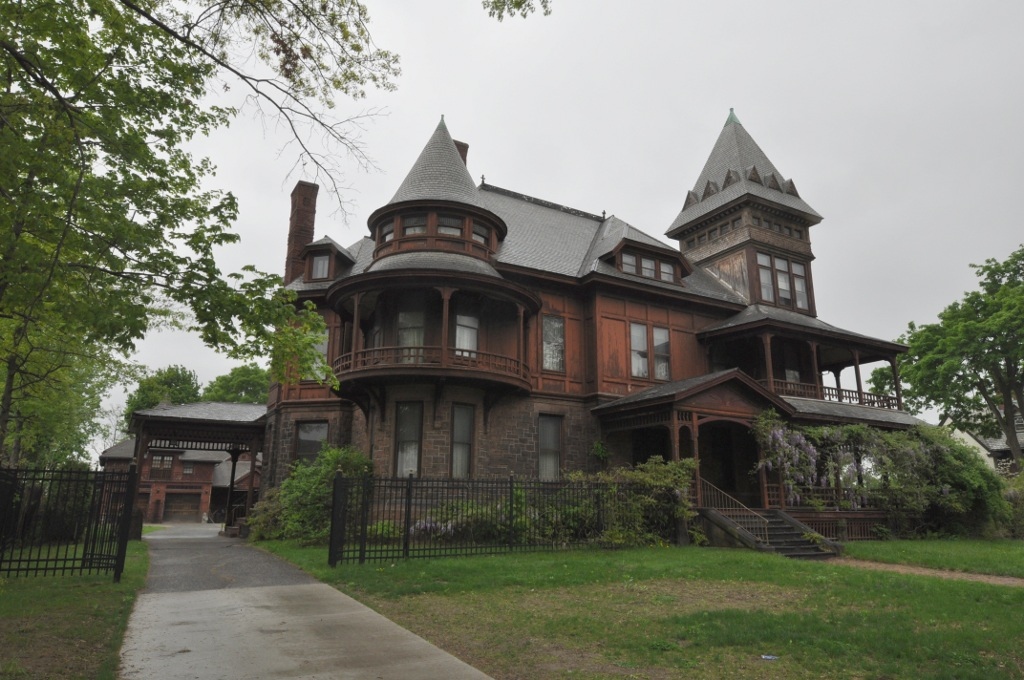
House for Julius H. Appleton, Springfield, Massachusetts, 1886.

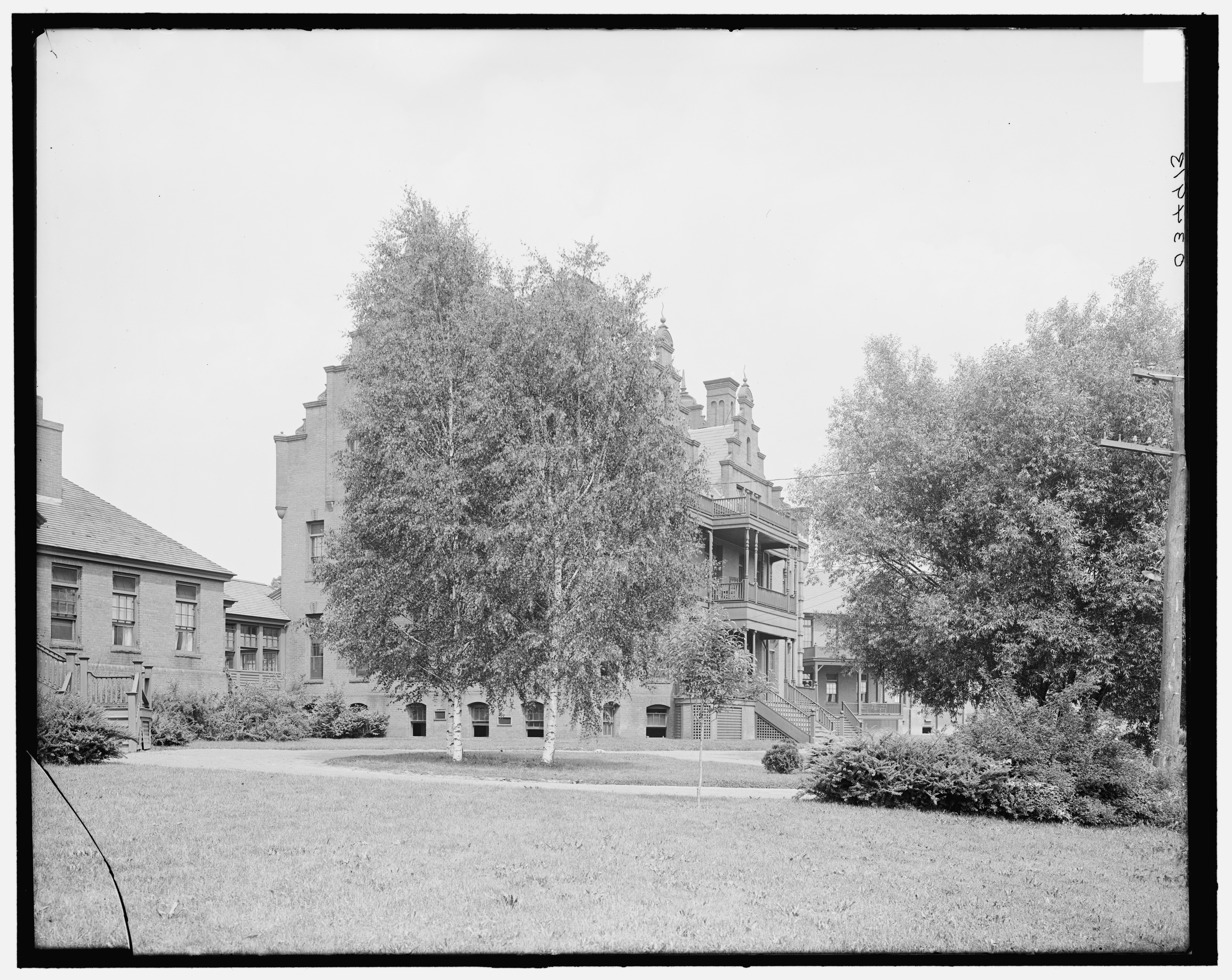
Springfield City Hospital, Springfield, Massachusetts, 1887-89.

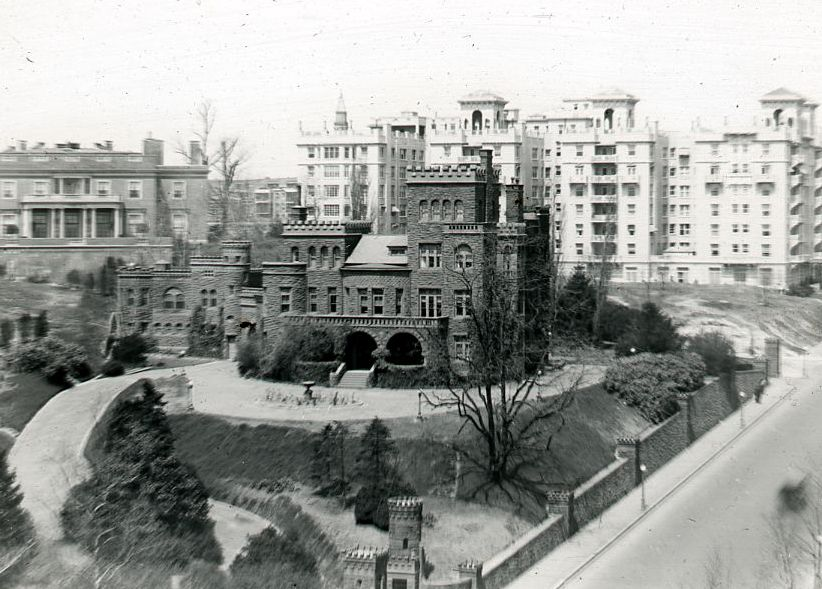
Henderson Castle, Washington, D.C., 1888-89.

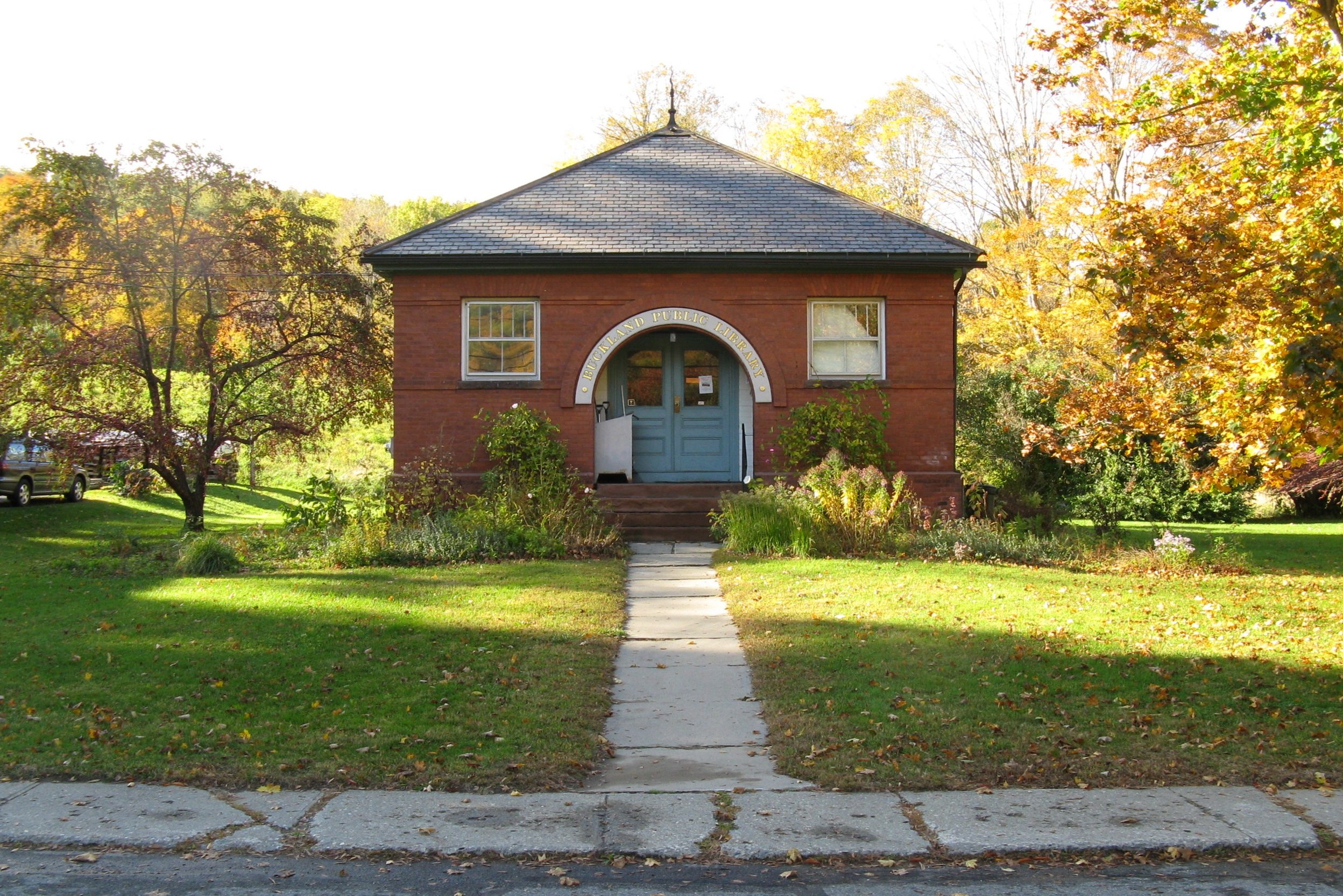
Buckland Public Library, Buckland, Massachusetts, 1890.

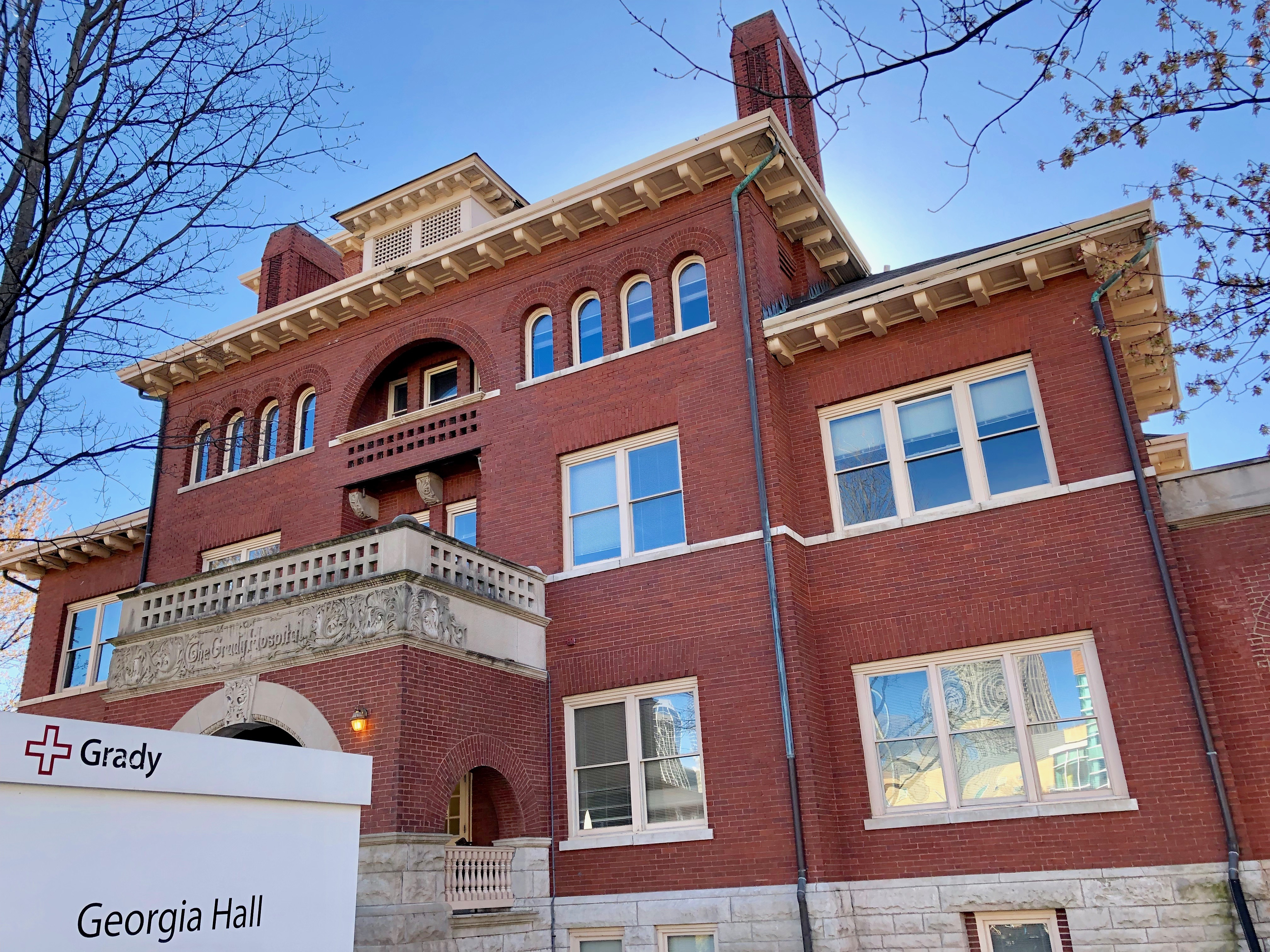
Grady Hospital, Atlanta, Georgia, 1890-92.

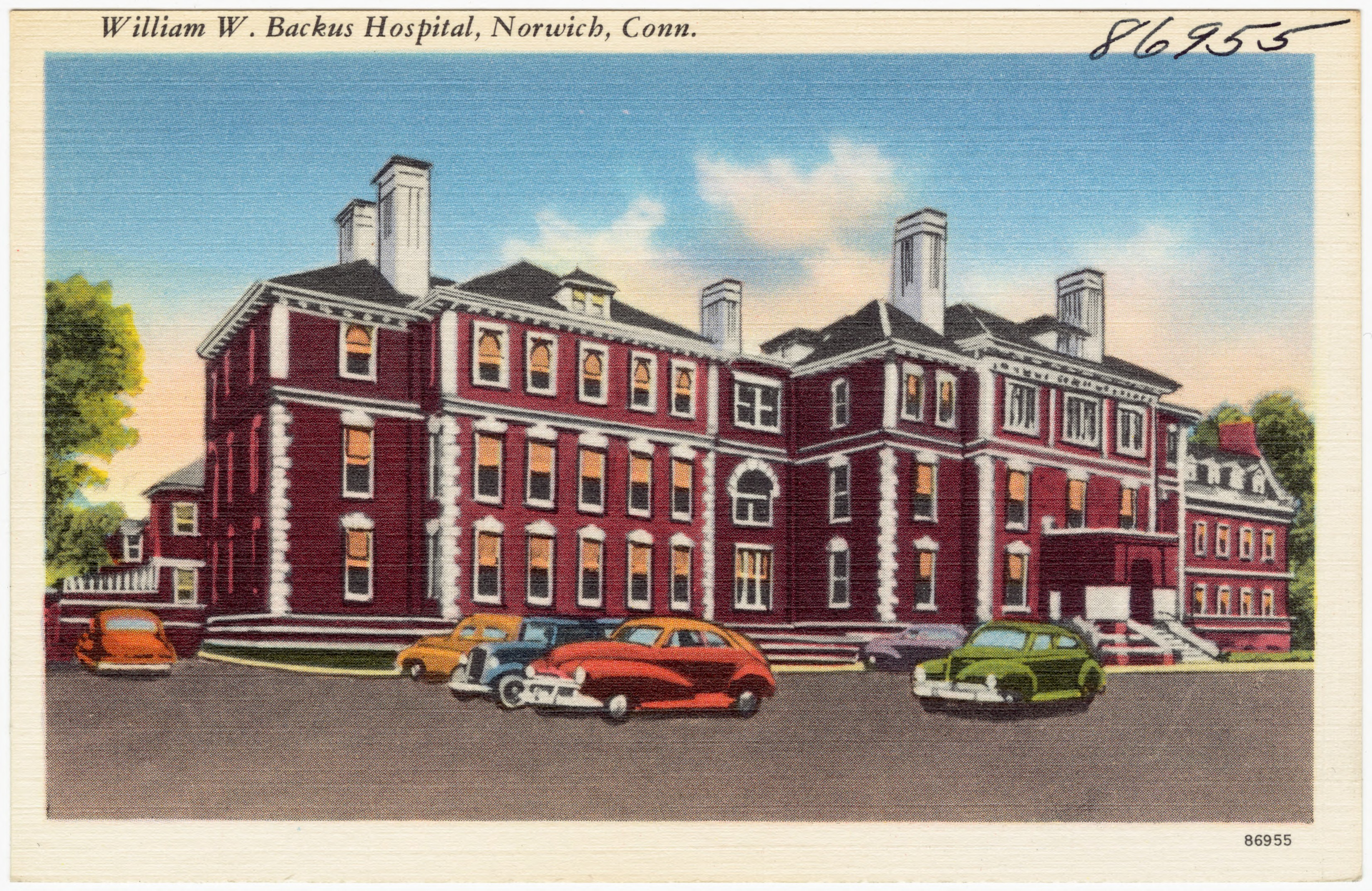
Backus Hospital, Norwich, Connecticut, 1893.

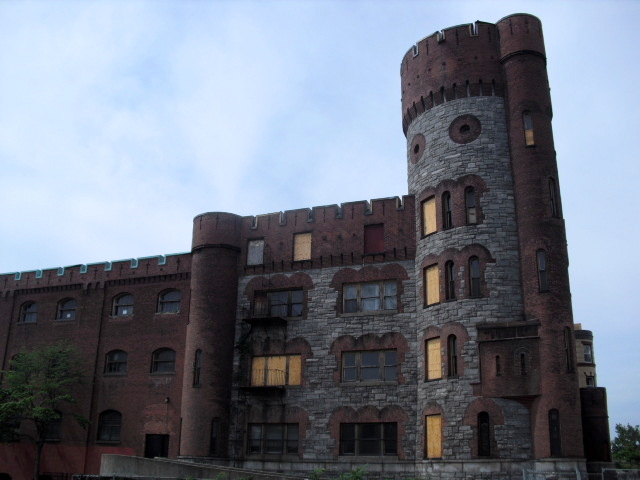
Springfield Armory, Springfield, Massachusetts, 1894-95.

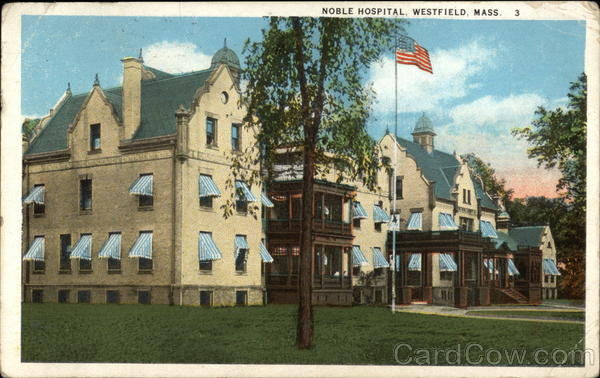
Noble Hospital, Westfield, Massachusetts, 1895-96.

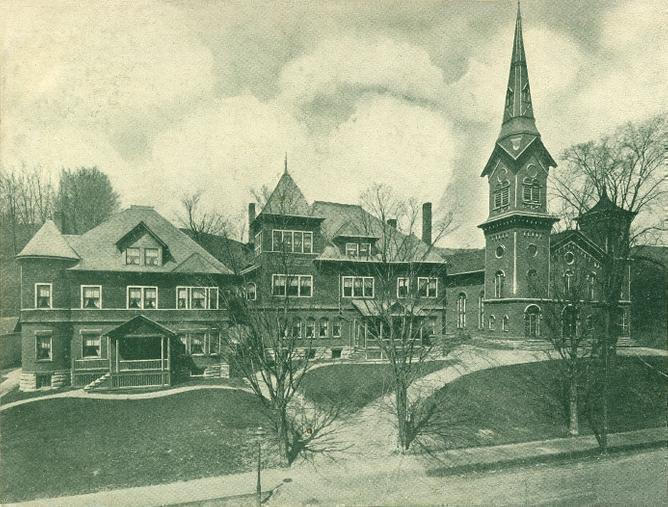
Parish house, First Congregational Church, Adams, Massachusetts, 1895.

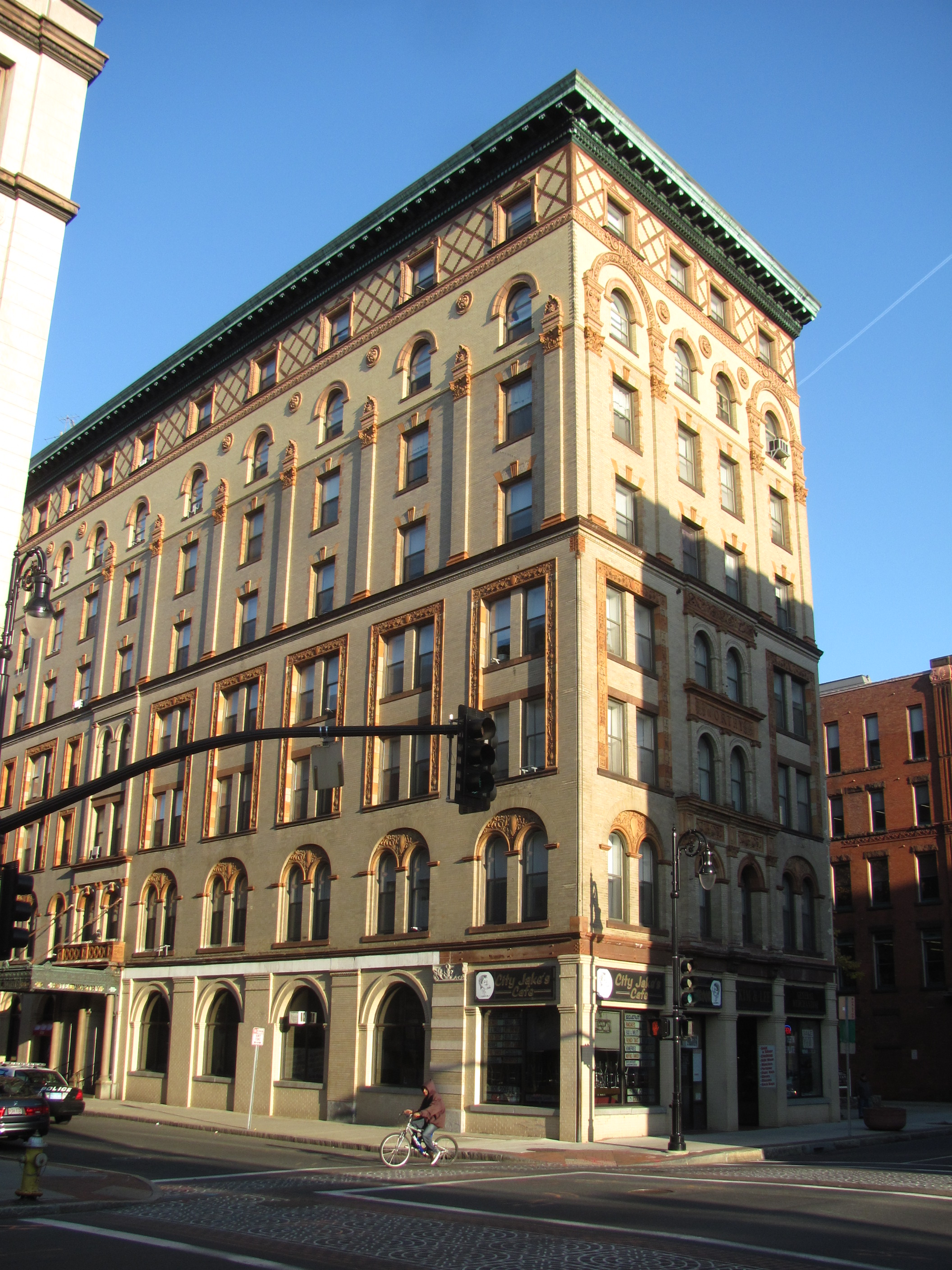
Worthy Hotel, Springfield, Massachusetts, 1895.

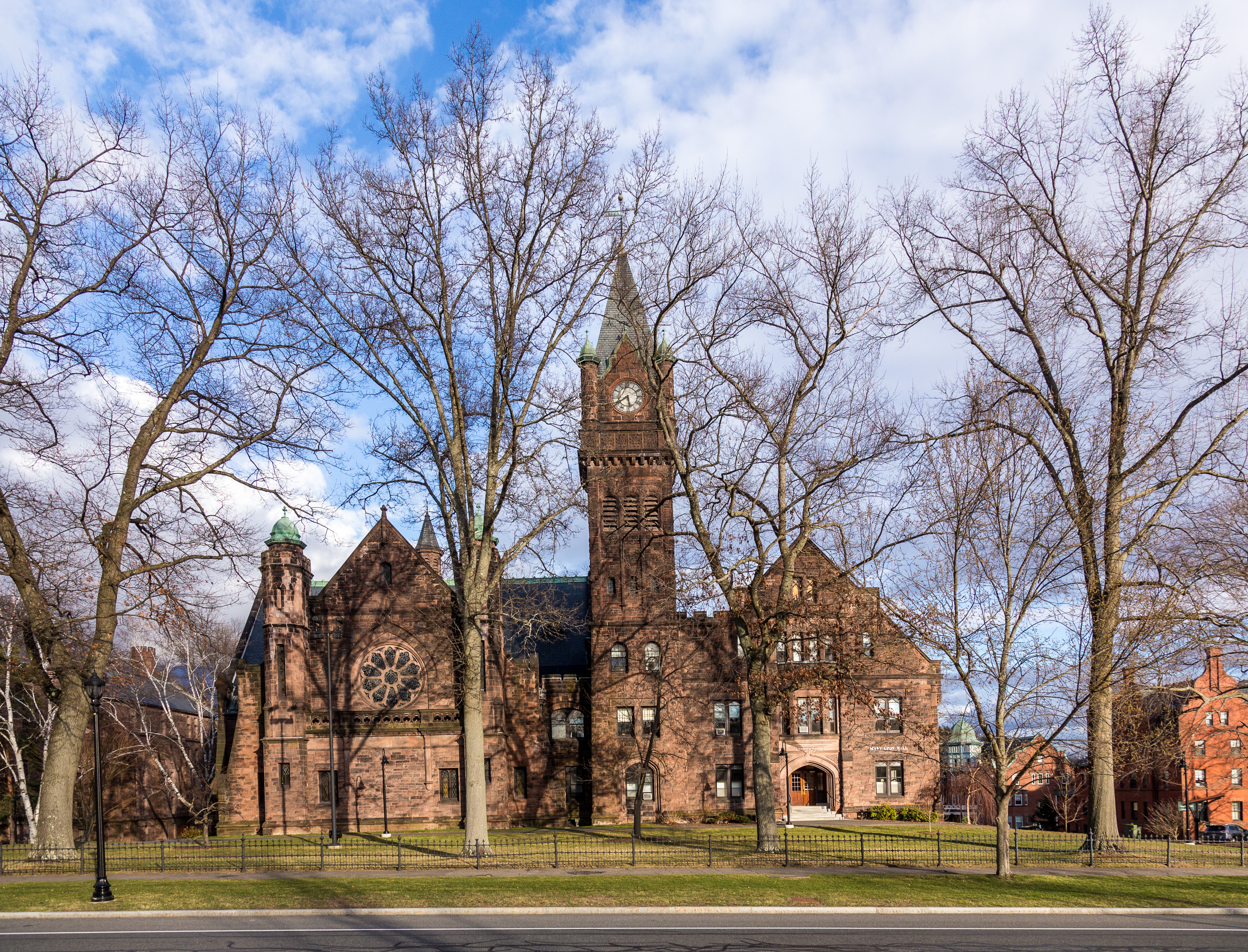
Mary Lyon Hall, Mount Holyoke College, South Hadley, Massachusetts, 1897.

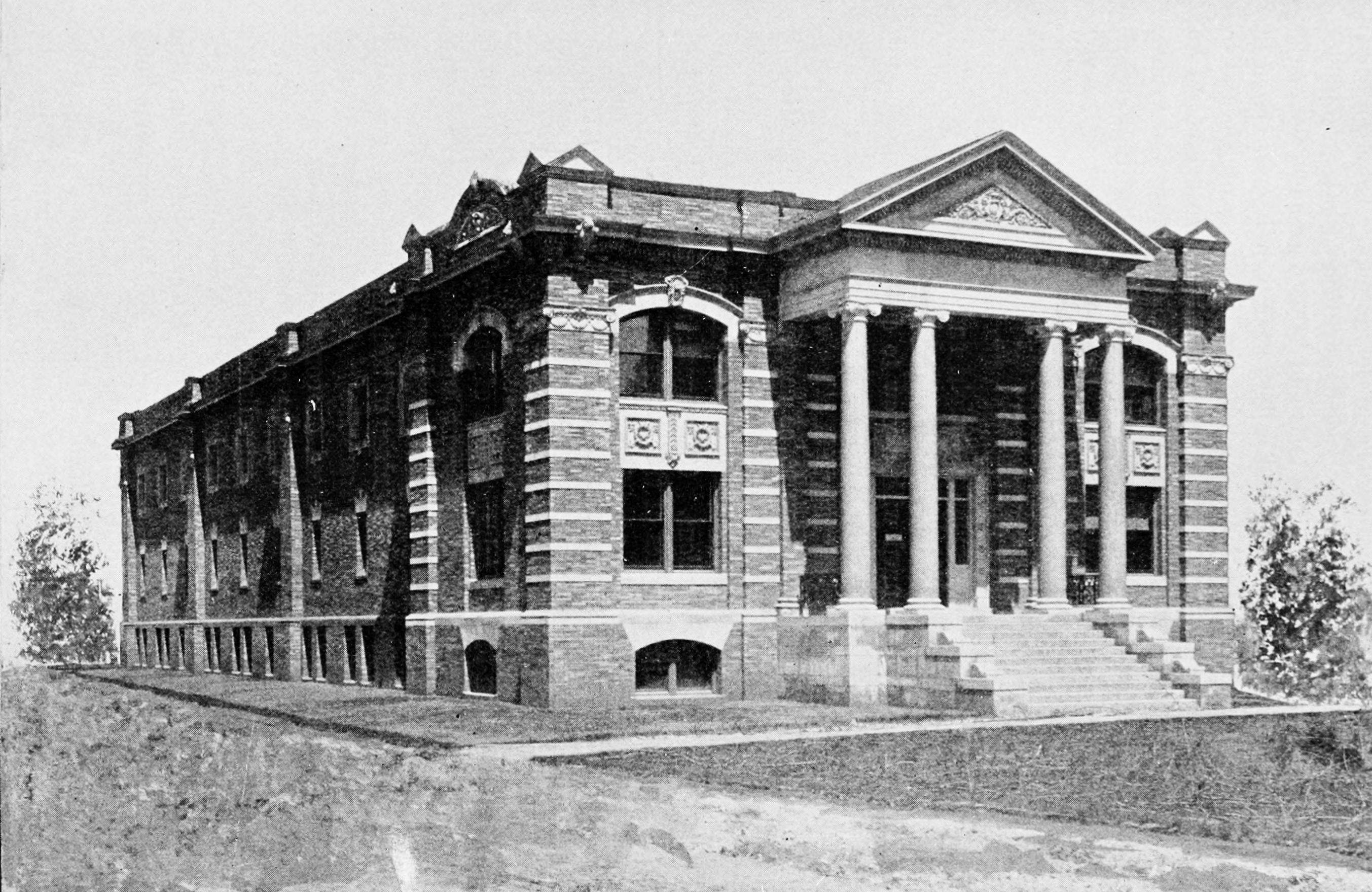
Springfield Science Museum, Springfield, Massachusetts, 1898-99.

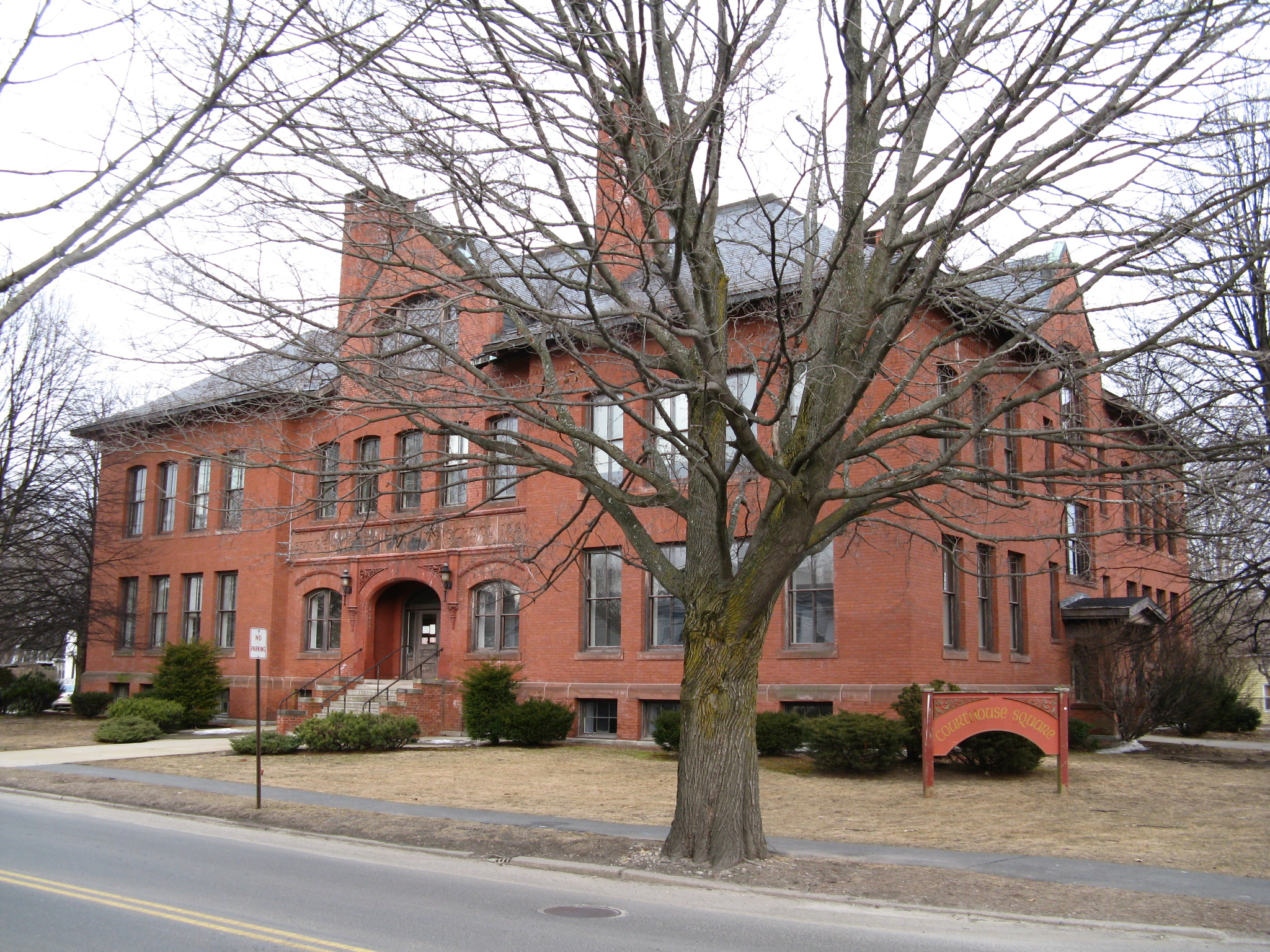
State Normal Training School, Westfield, Massachusetts, 1899-1900.

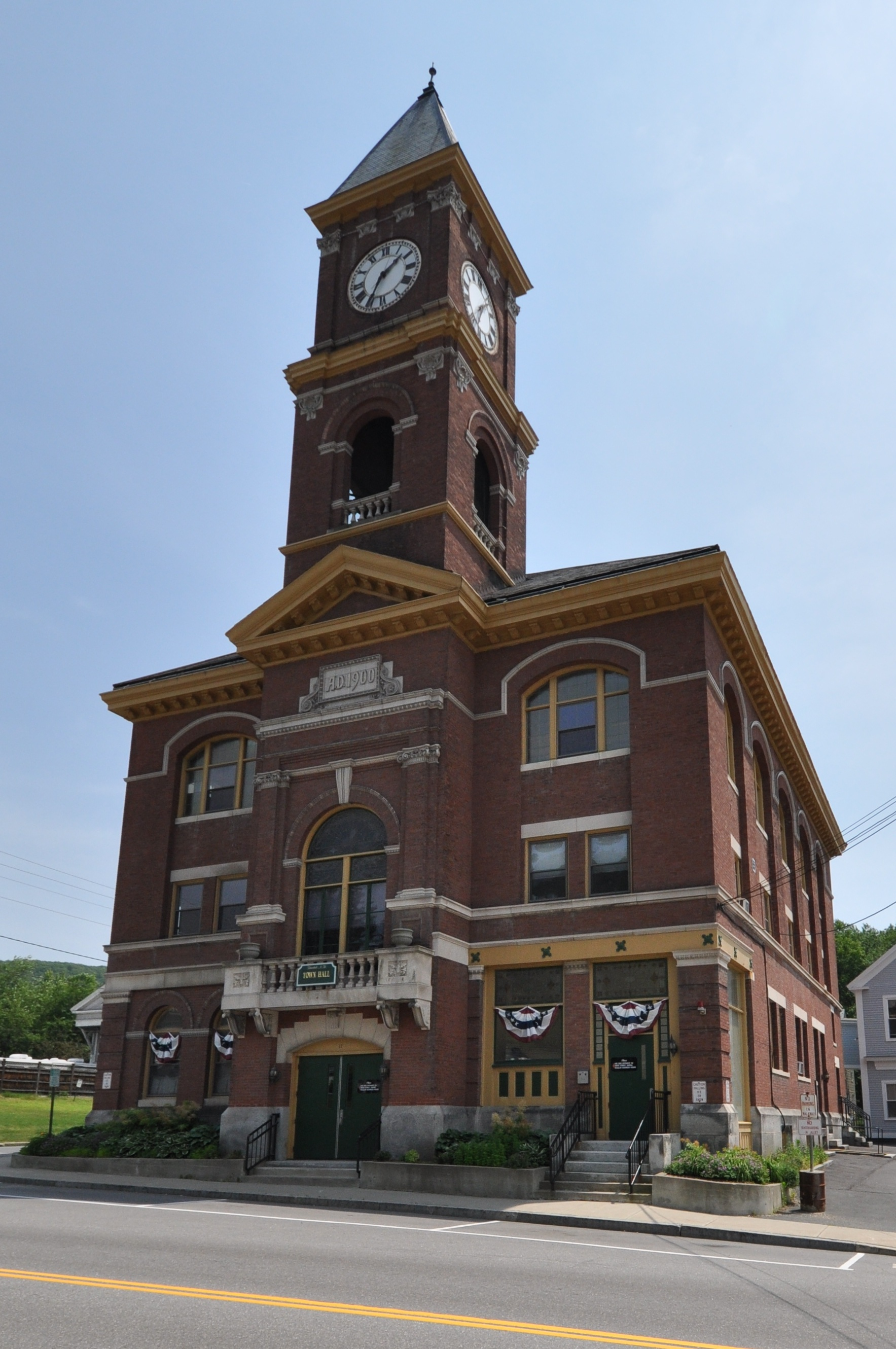
Hinsdale Town Hall, Hinsdale, New Hampshire, 1900.

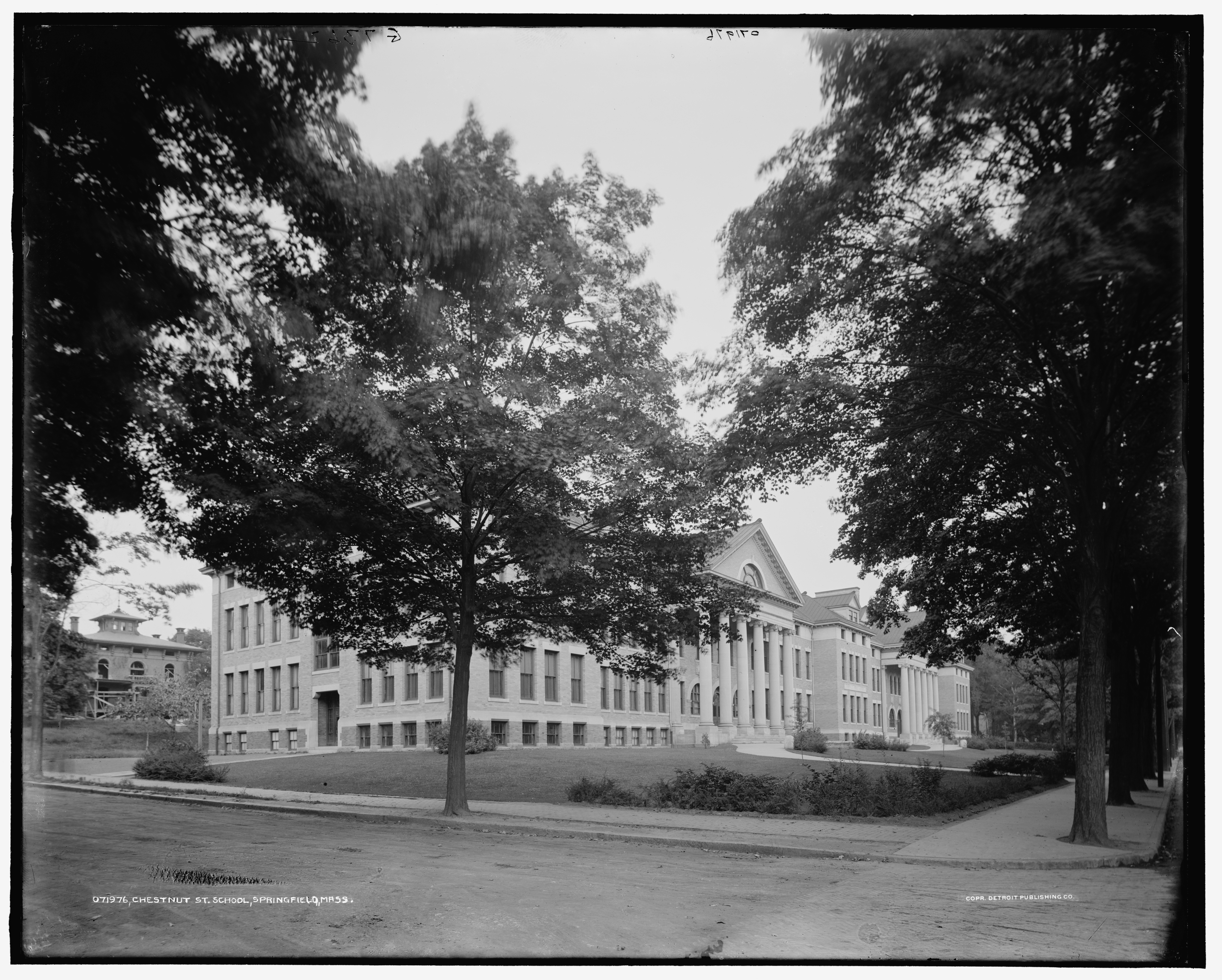
Chestnut Street School, Springfield, Massachusetts, 1901 et seq.

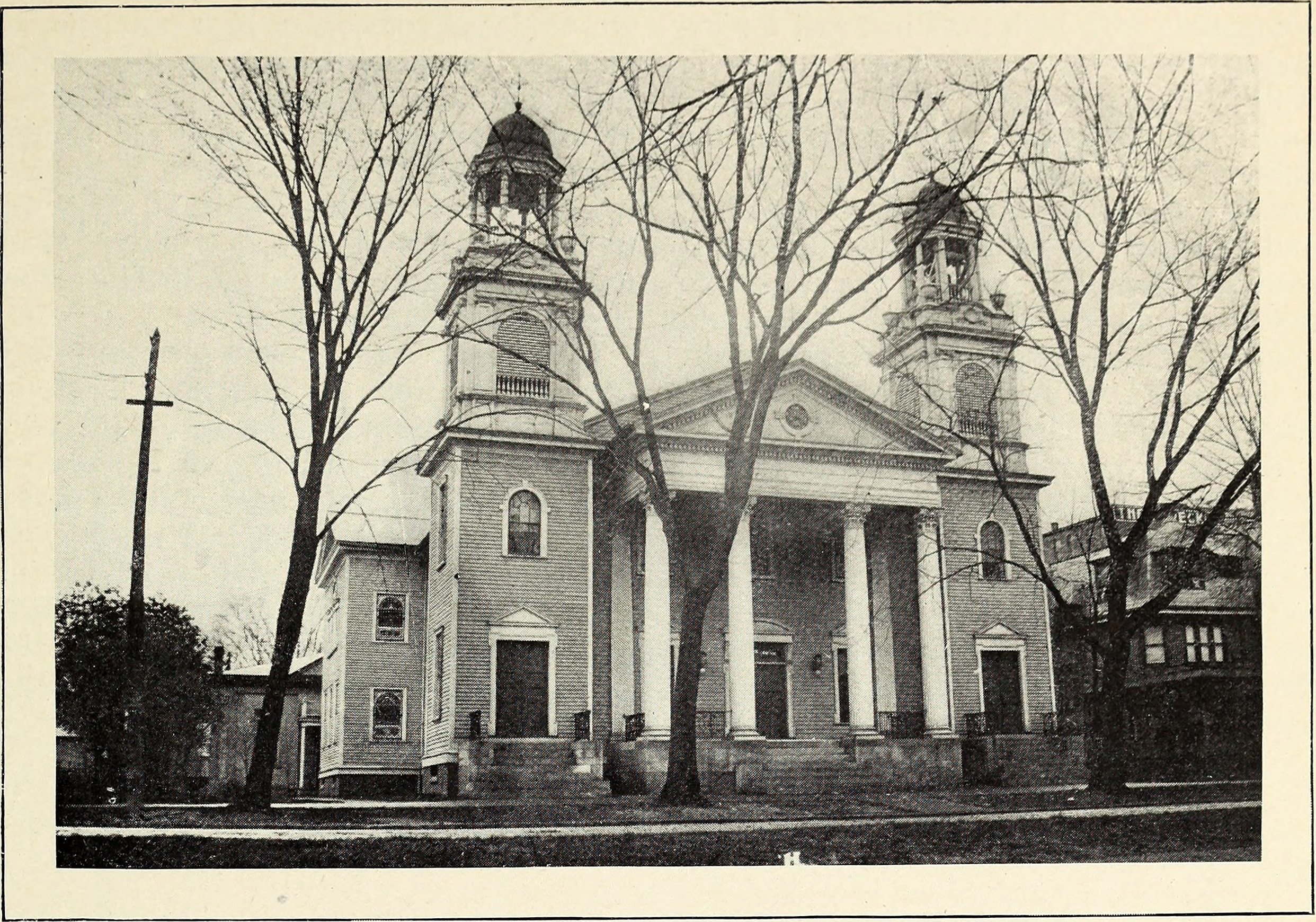
Remodeling of the First Congregational Church, Marietta, Ohio, 1901.

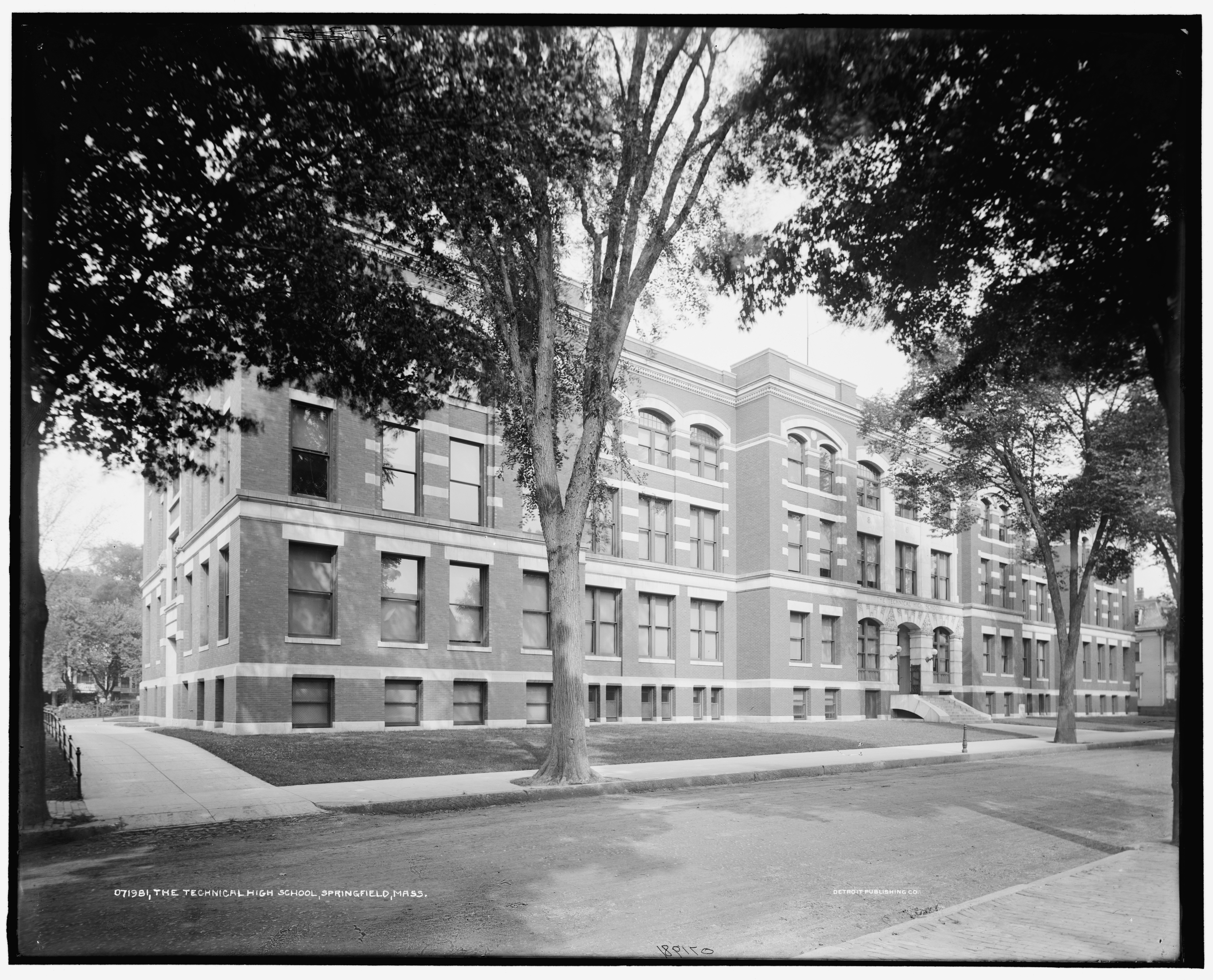
Springfield Technical High School, Springfield, Massachusetts, 1904-06 et seq.

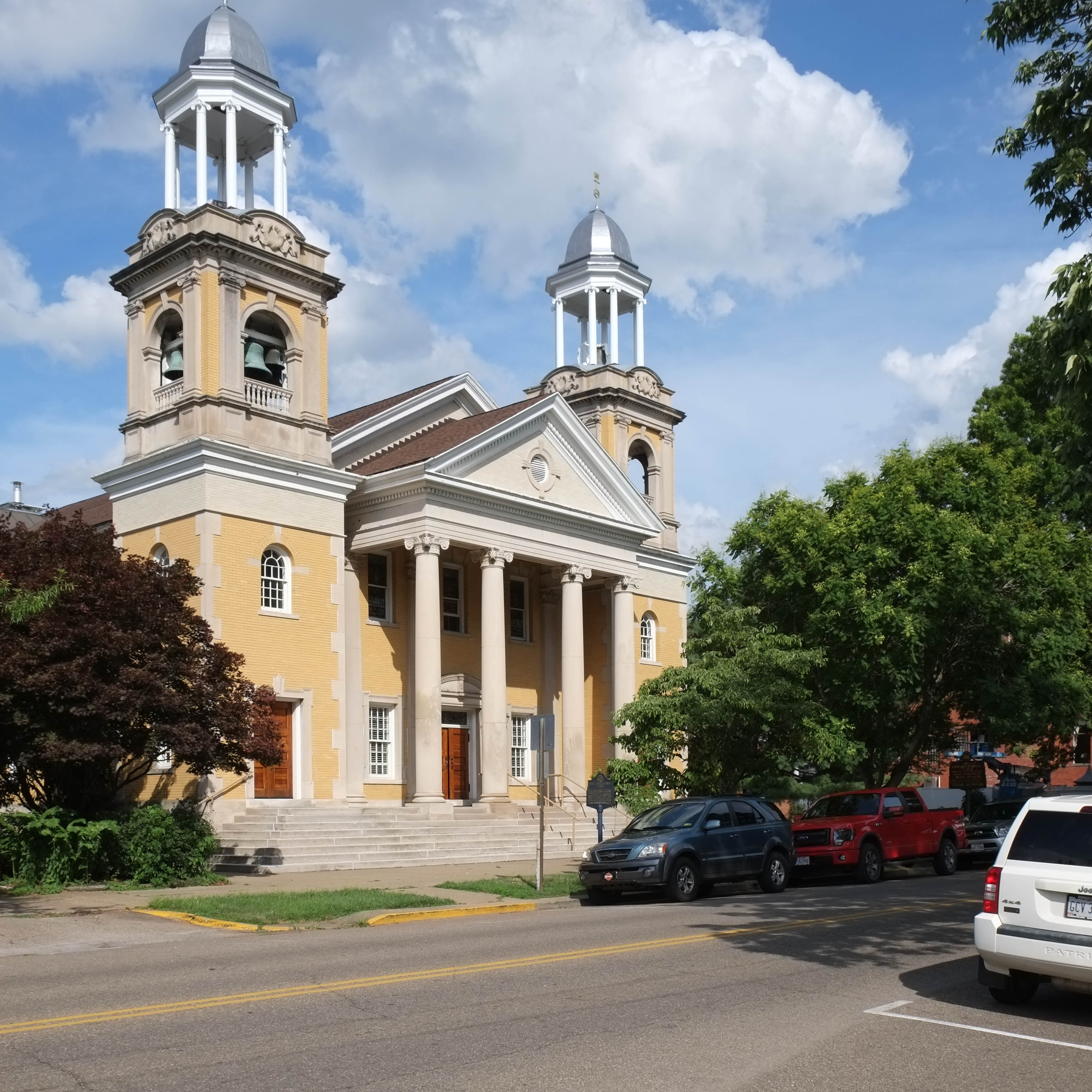
First Congregational Church, Marietta, Ohio, 1905-06.

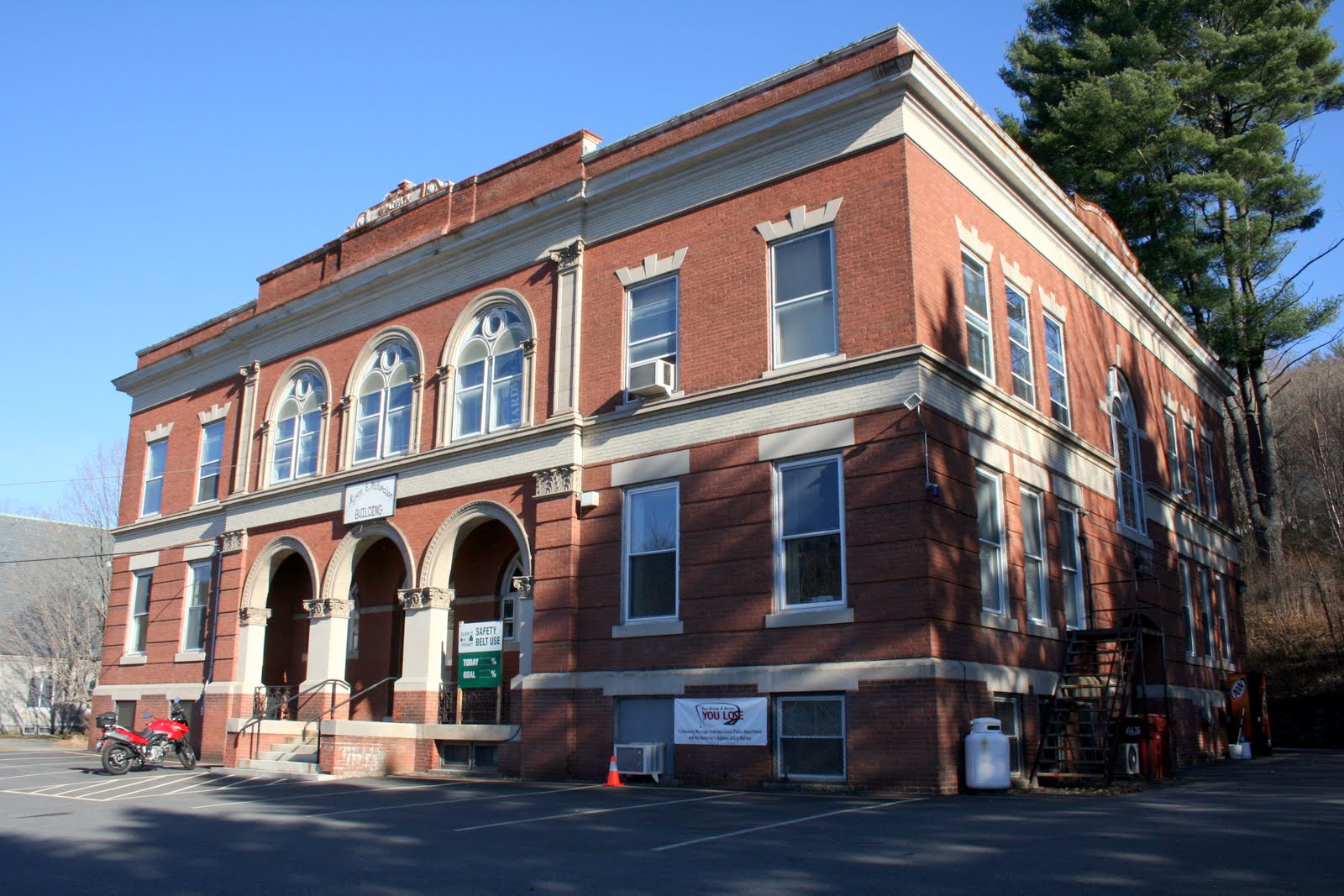
Hardwick High School, Gilbertville, Massachusetts, 1910.

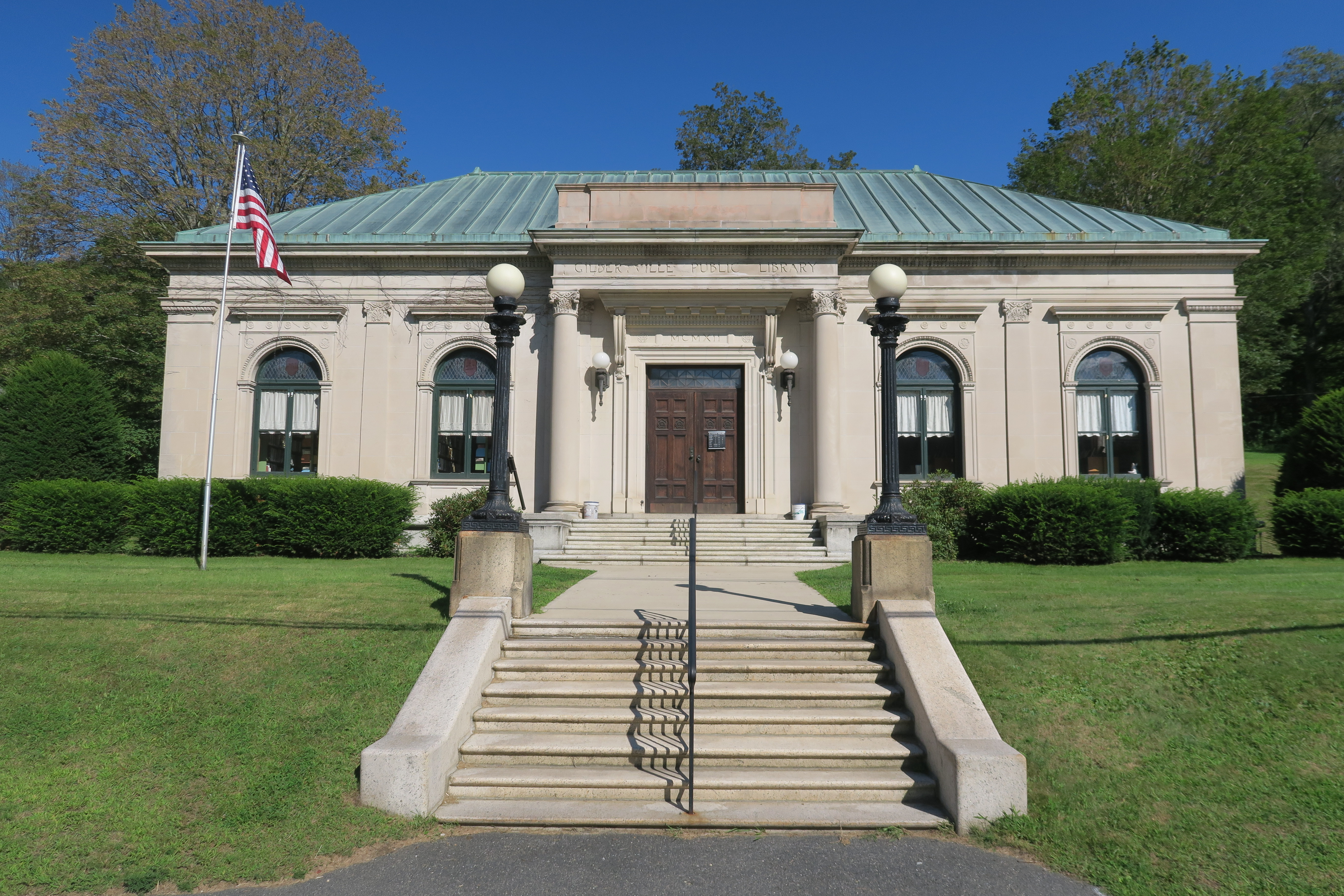
Gilbertville Public Library, Gilbertville, Massachusetts, 1911-12.

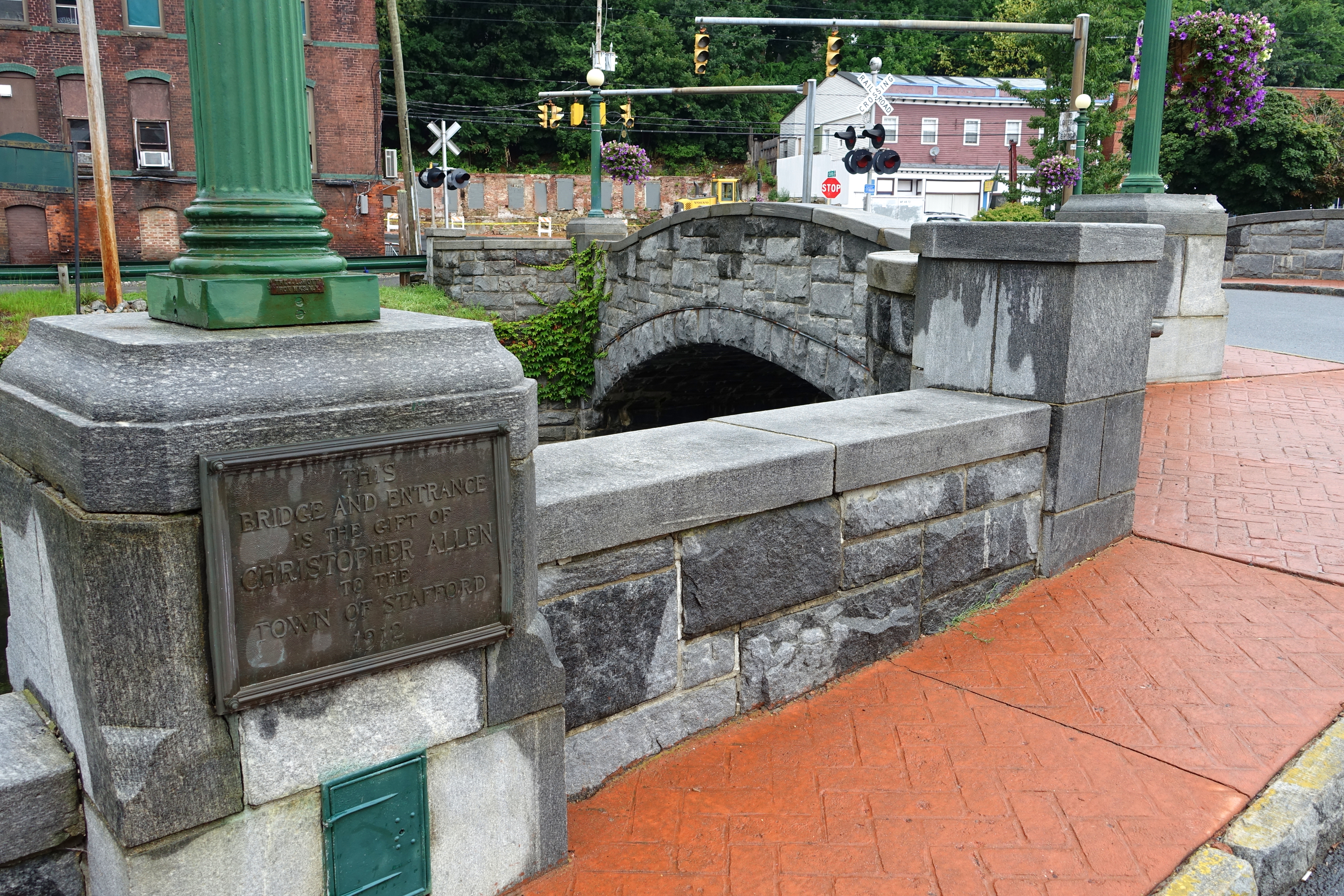
Christopher Allen Bridge, Stafford Springs, Connecticut, 1912.

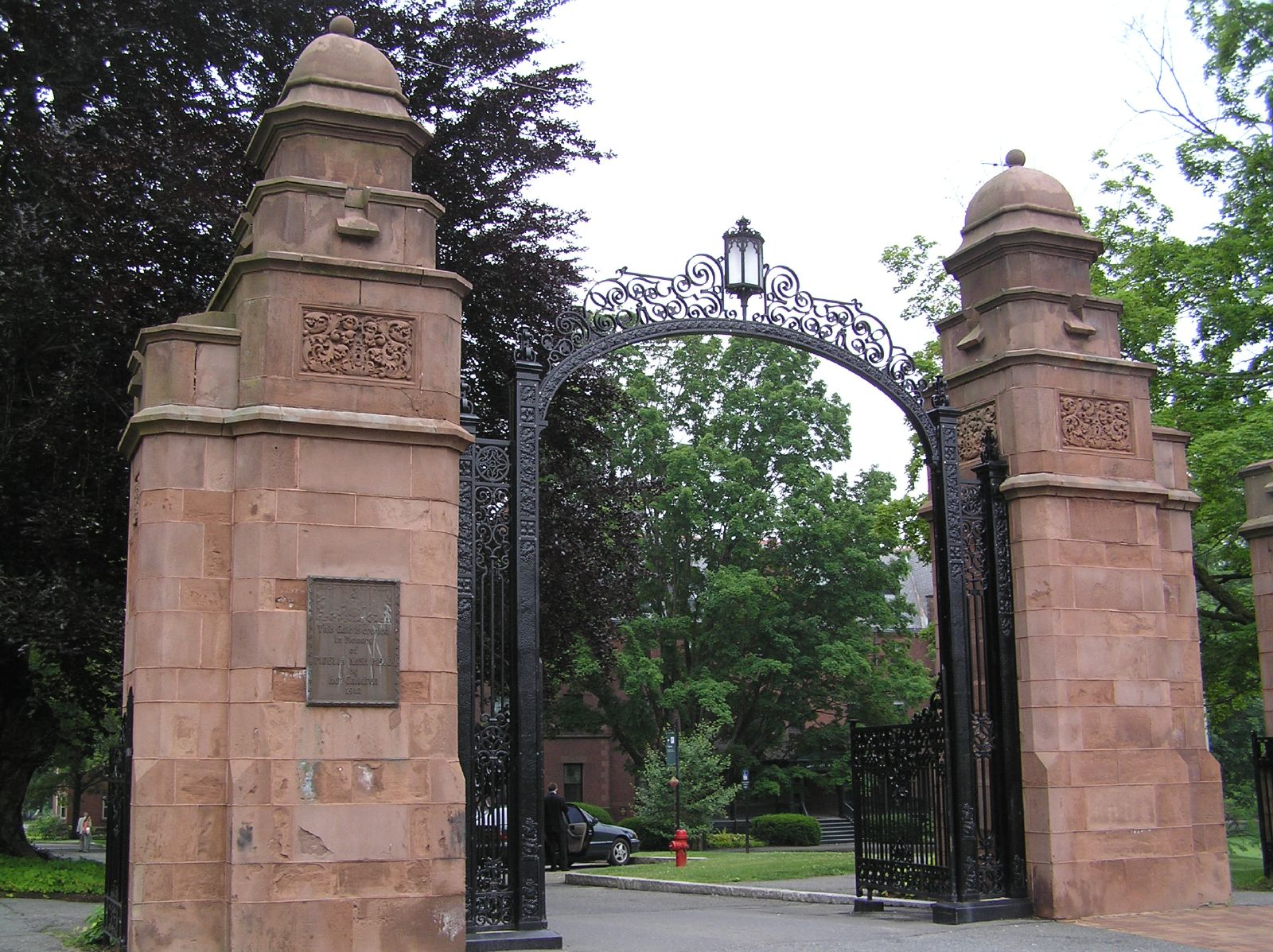
Fidelia Nash Field Gate, Mount Holyoke College, South Hadley, Massachusetts, 1912.

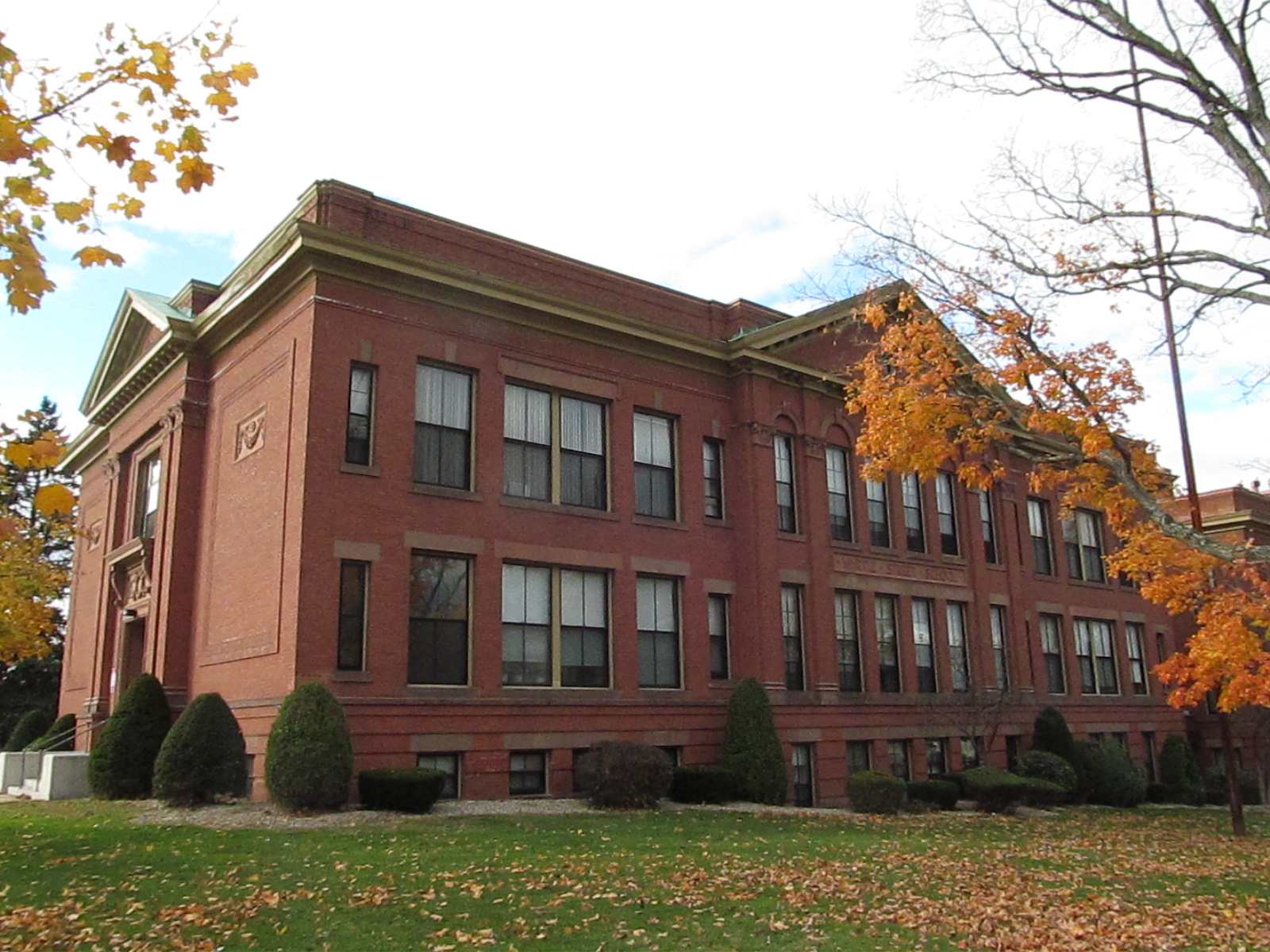
Addition to the Myrtle Street School, Indian Orchard, Massachusetts, 1914-15.

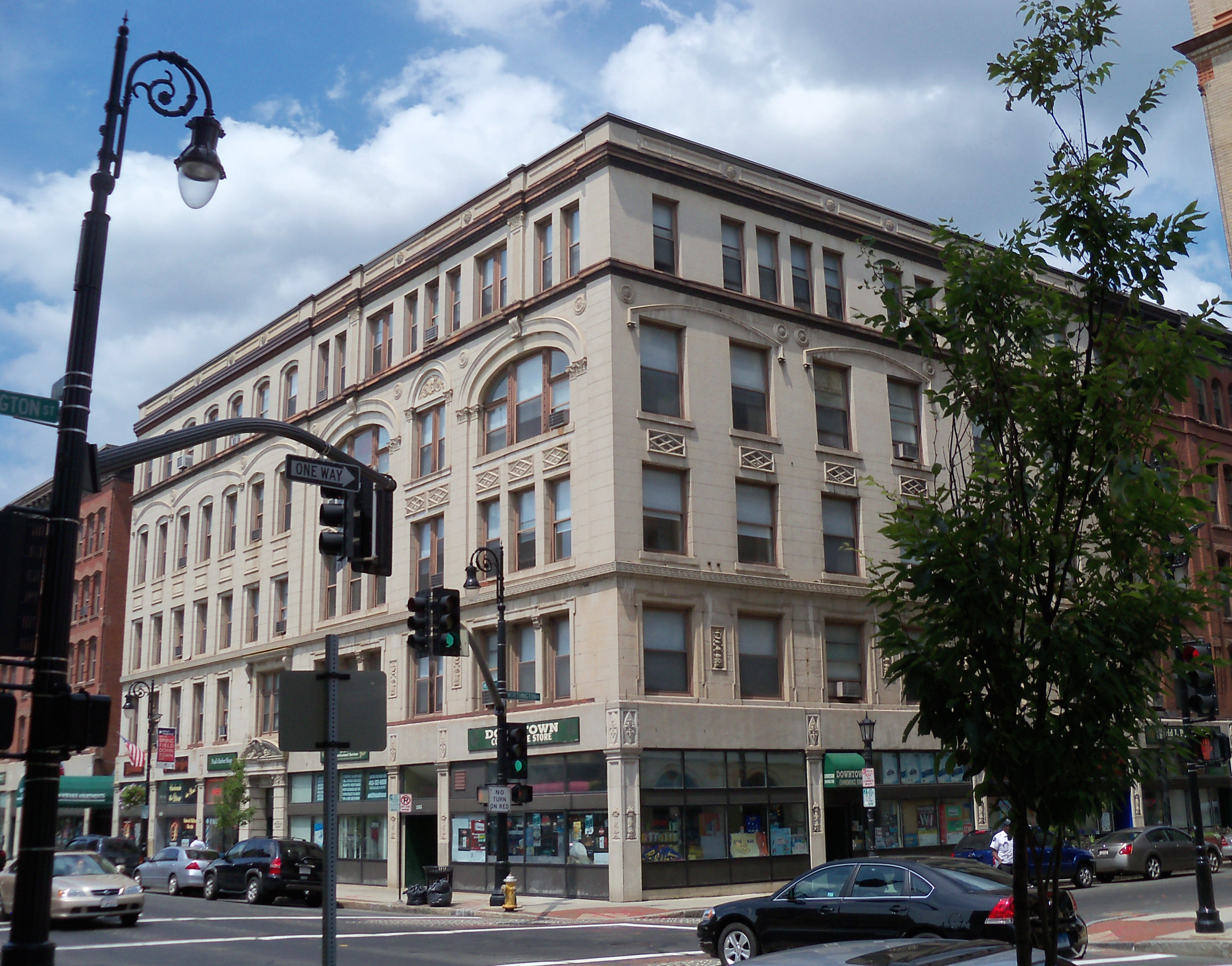
Remodeling of the Worthington Building, Springfield, Massachusetts, 1914.

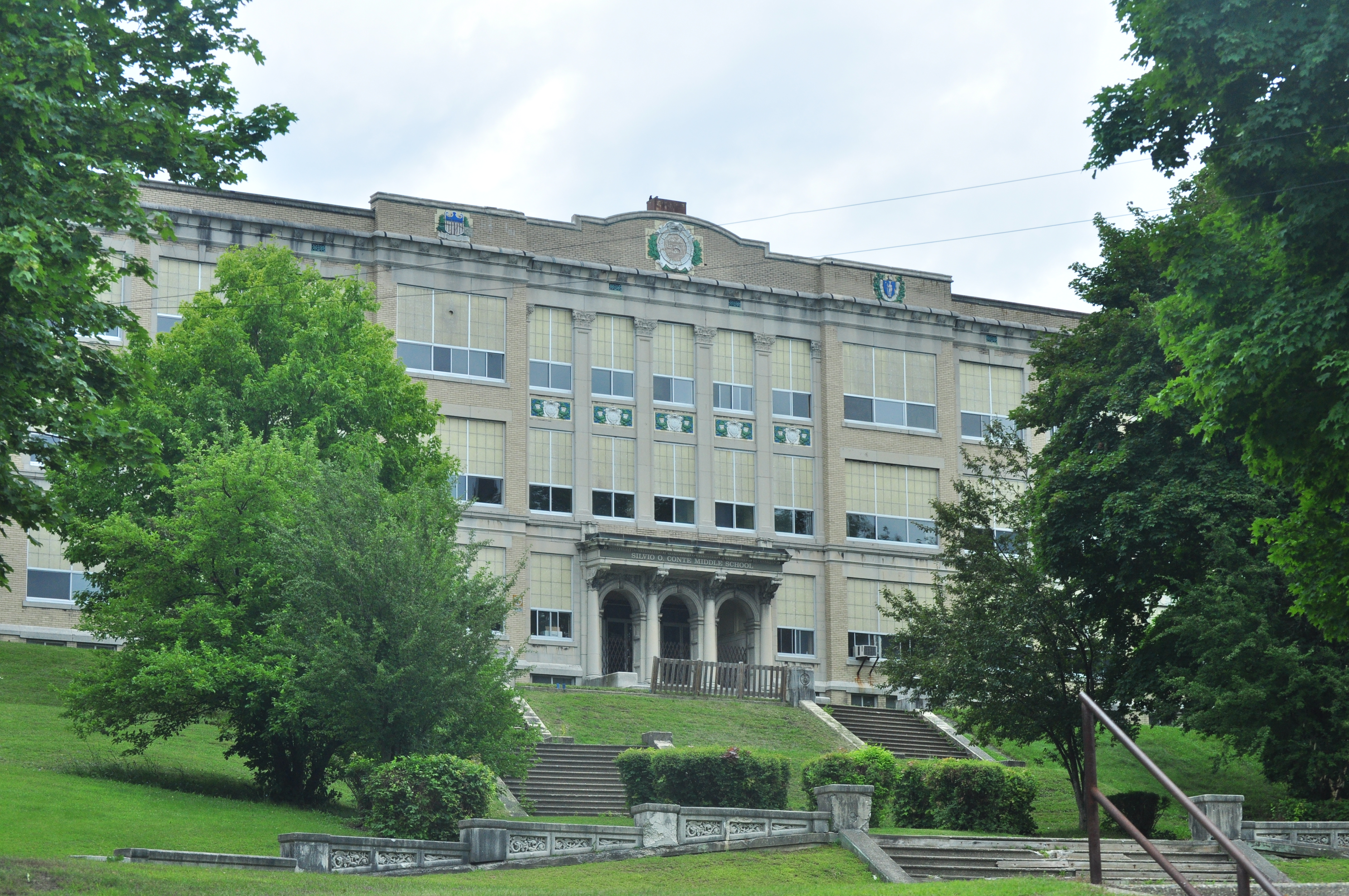
Drury High School, North Adams, Massachusetts, 1915-17.

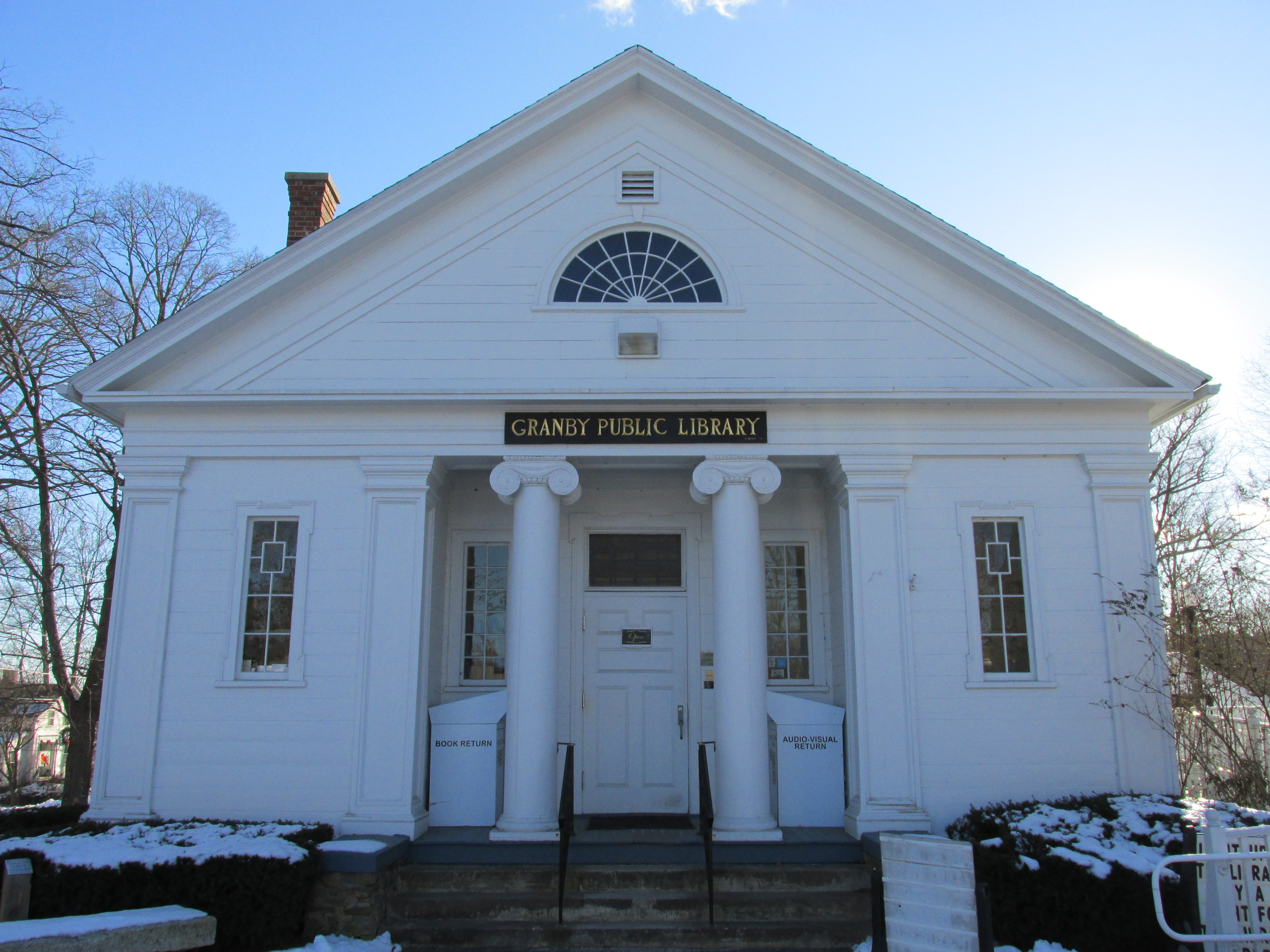
Granby Free Public Library, Granby, Massachusetts, 1917.

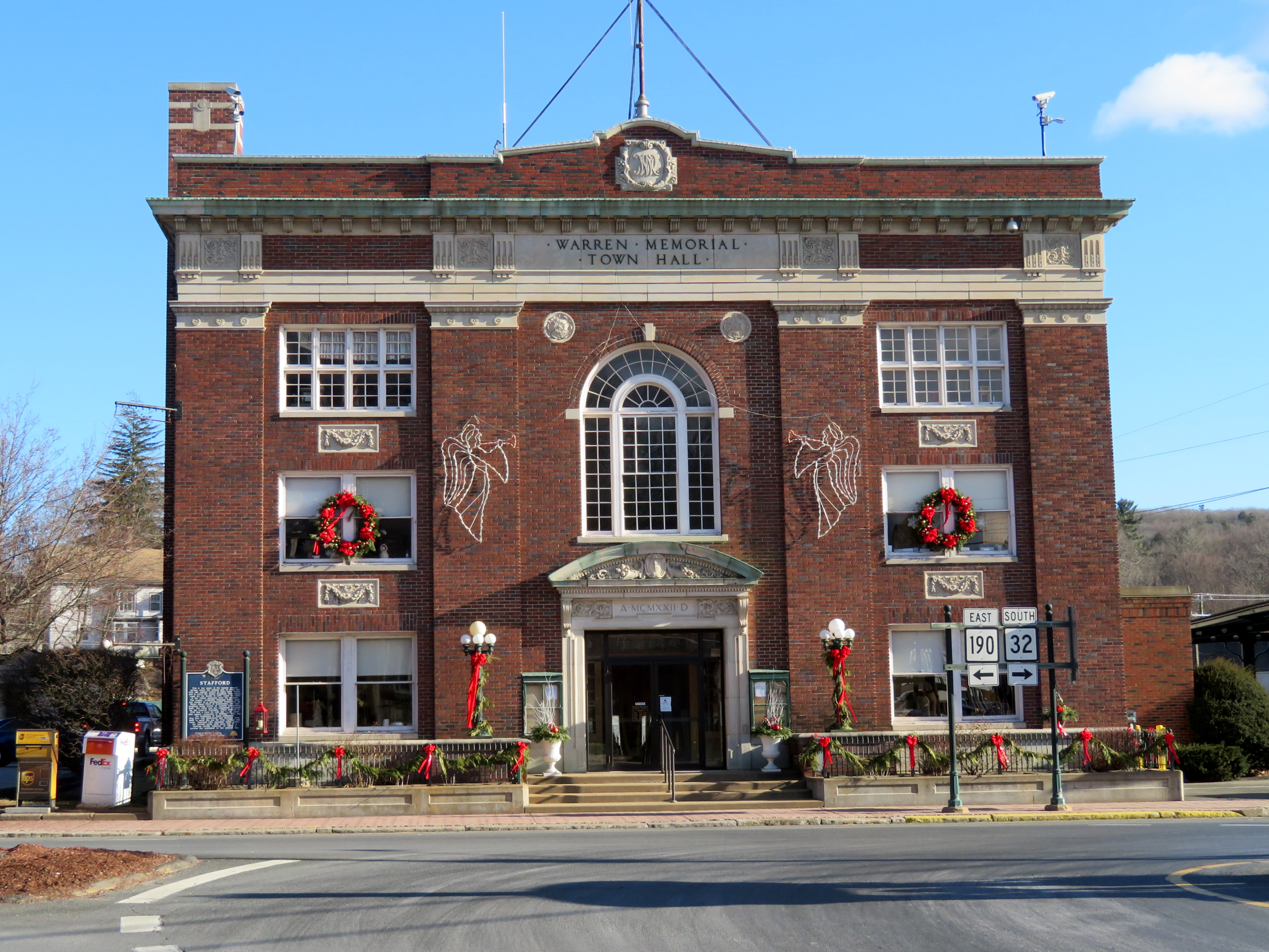
Warren Memorial Town Hall, Stafford Springs, Connecticut, 1922.

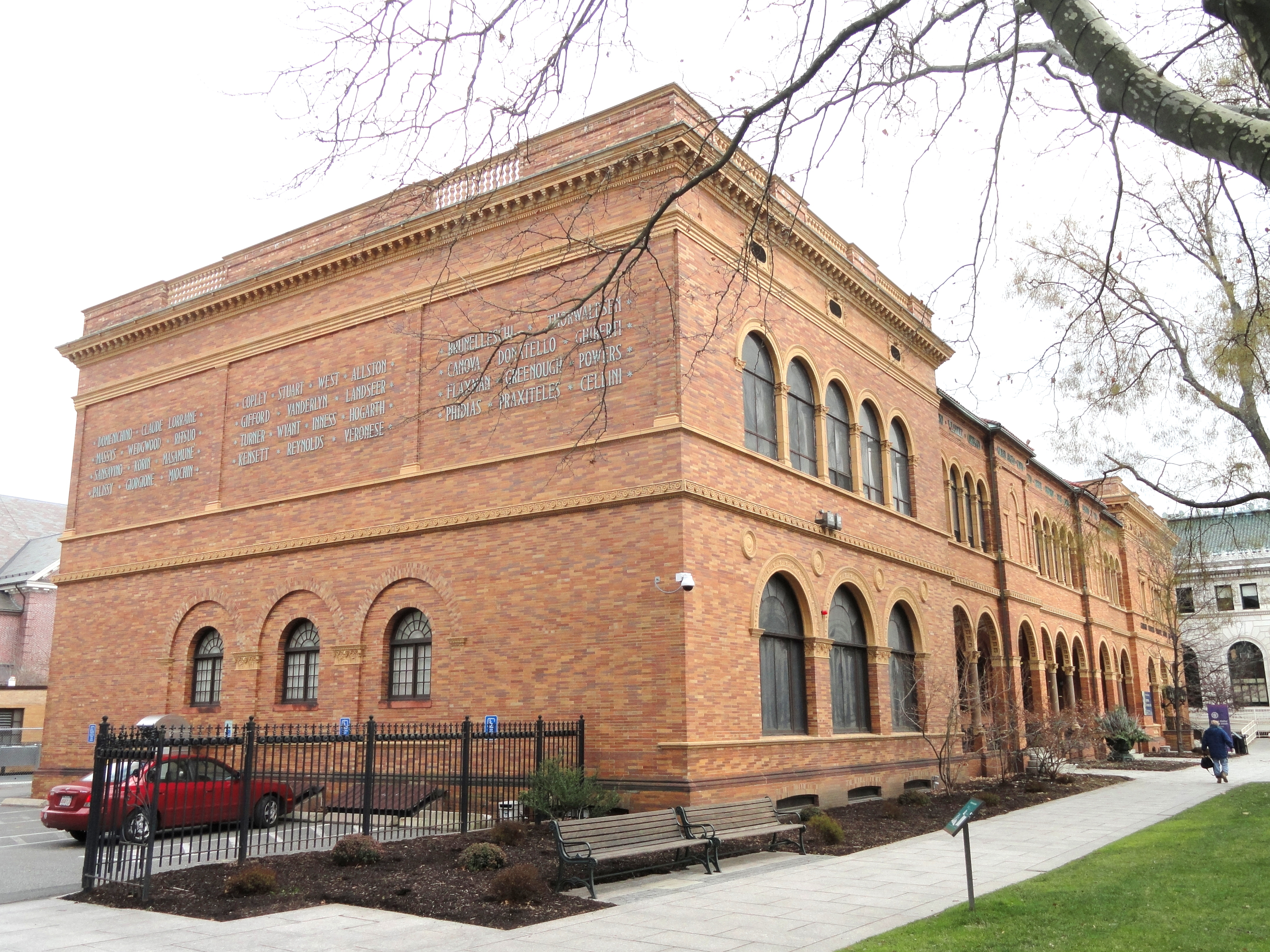
North wing addition, George Walter Vincent Smith Art Museum, Springfield, Massachusetts, 1923.

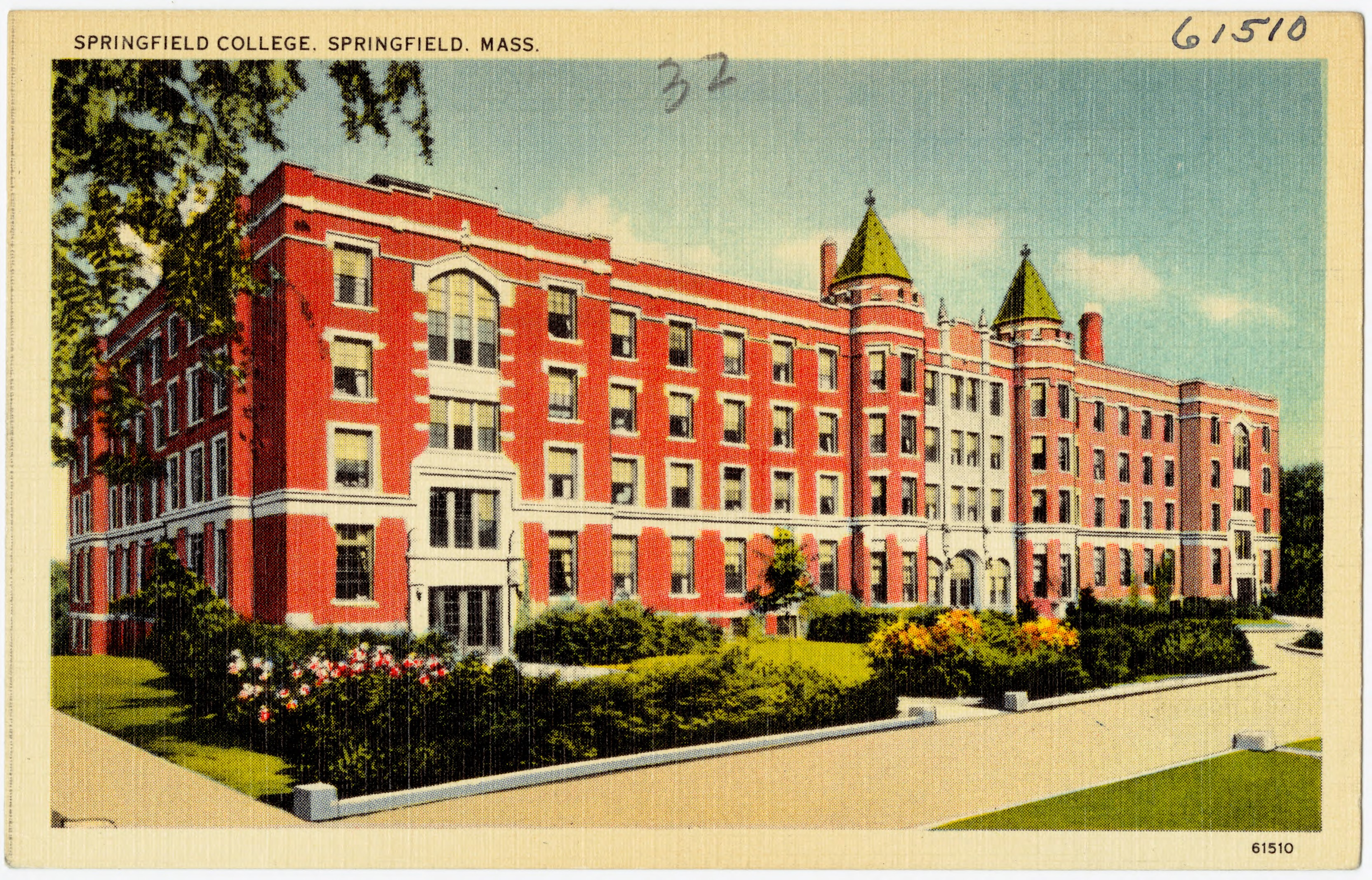
Alumni Hall, Springfield College, Springfield, Massachusetts, 1927.

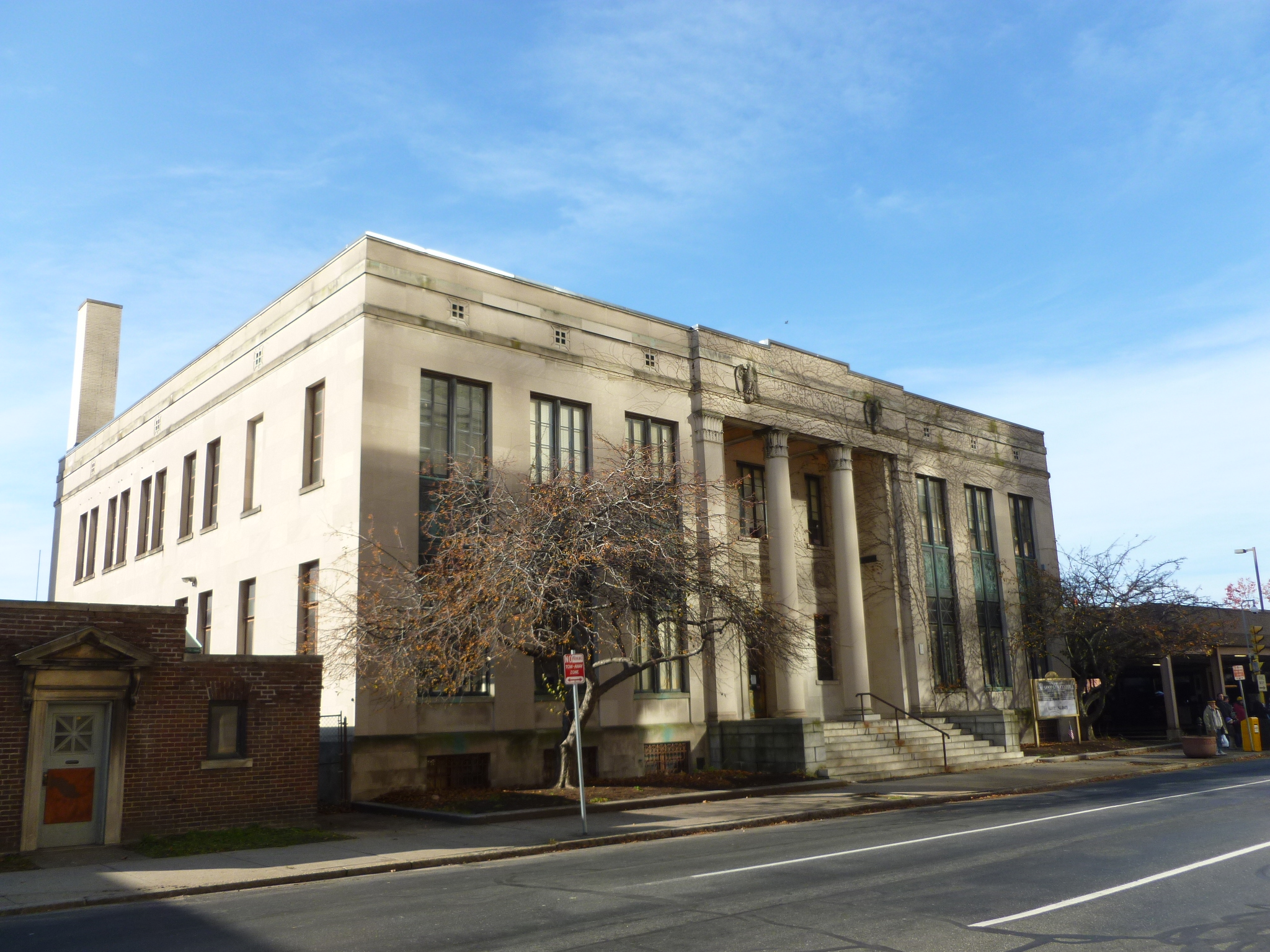
Springfield District Court, Springfield, Massachusetts, 1929-30.

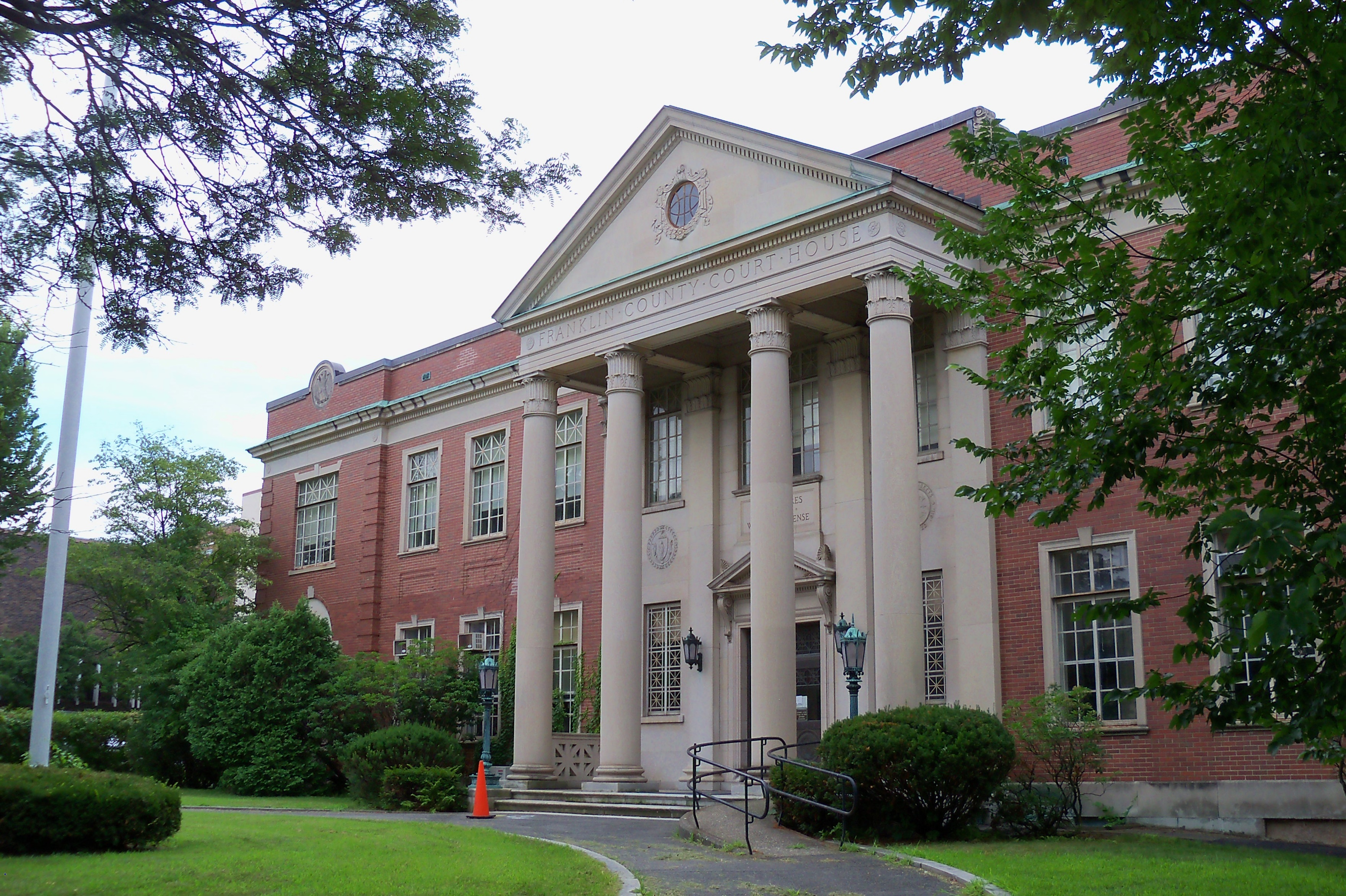
Franklin County Courthouse, Greenfield, Massachusetts, 1931.

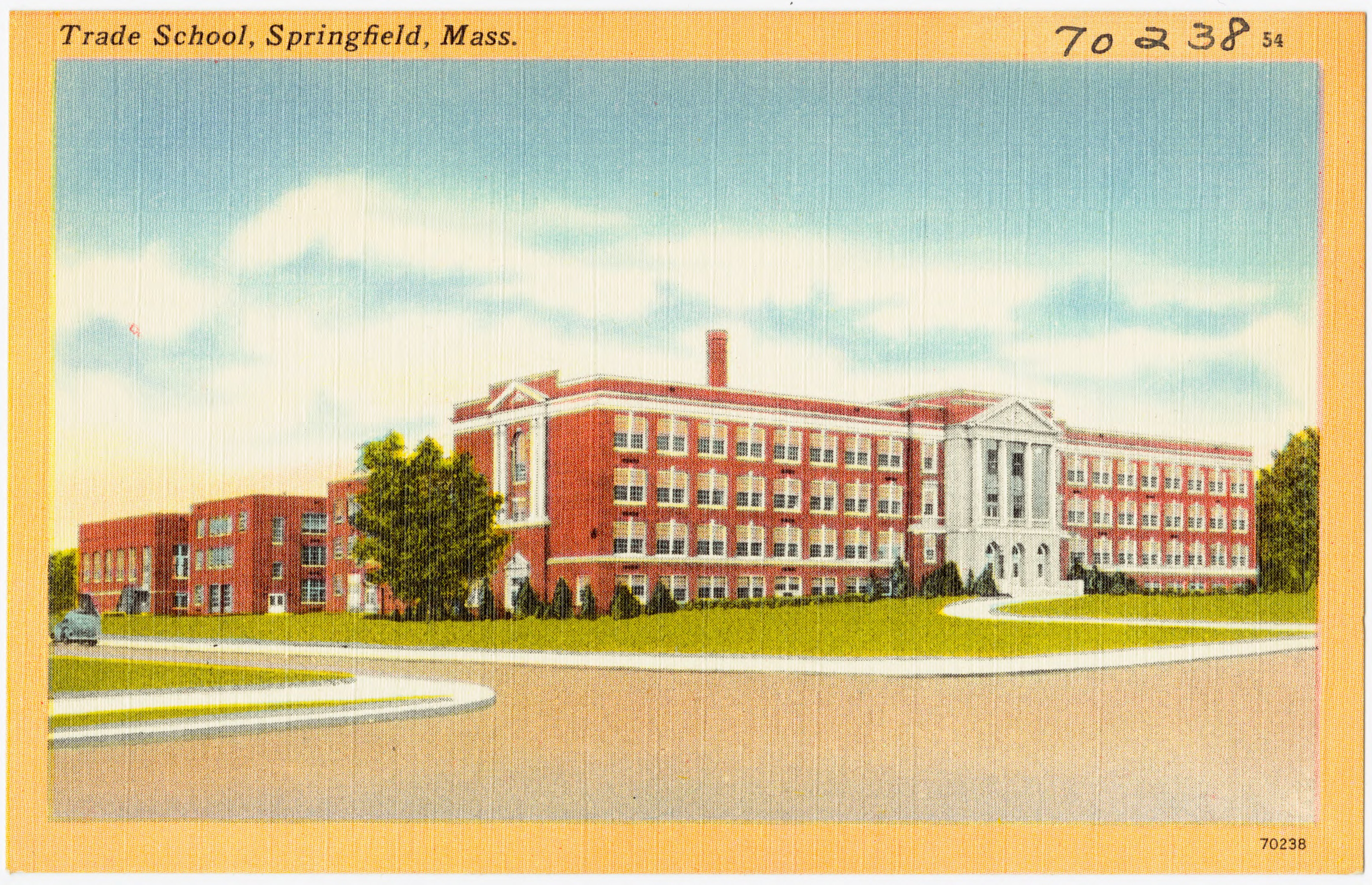
Springfield Trade High School, Springfield, Massachusetts, 1939.

== Partial bibliography ==
=== Books ===
- E. C. Gardner, Homes, and How to Make Them (Boston: James R. Osgood and Company, 1874)
- E. C. Gardner, Illustrated Homes: A Series of Papers Describing Real Houses and Real People (Boston: James R. Osgood and Company, 1875)
- E. C. Gardner, Home Interiors (Boston: James R. Osgood and Company, 1878)
- E. C. Gardner, Common Sense in Church Building (New York: Bicknell & Comstock, 1880)
- E. C. Gardner, Farm Architecture (Holyoke: C. W. Bryan, 1882)
- E. C. Gardner, The House that Jill Built, after Jack's had Proved a Failure (New York: Fords, Howard & Hulbert, 1882) (Note: Reissued in 1896.)
- E. C. Gardner, Homes, and All About Them (Boston, James R. Osgood and Company, 1885) (Note: A compilation of Homes (1874), Illustrated Homes (1875) and Home Interiors (1878).)
- E. C. Gardner, Town and Country School Buildings (New York and Chicago: E. L. Kellogg & Company, 1888)

=== Book chapters and articles ===
- E. C. Gardner, "The Architecture of Modern Hospitals," Engineering Magazine 9, no. 6 (September 1895): 1086–1110.
- E. C. Gardner, "An Arraignment of American City Architecture," Engineering Magazine 12, no. 1 (October 1896): 30–48.
- E. C. Gardner, "The Visible Charm: As it Was, is and May Be" in Springfield, Present and Prospective, ed. James E. Tower (Springfield: Pond & Campbell, 1905)
- E. C. Gardner, "Planning the Commercial Portions of Cities," American City 6, no. 5 (May 1912): 724–727.
