= First Church of Christ (Northampton, Massachusetts) =

Historic church in Massachusetts, United States

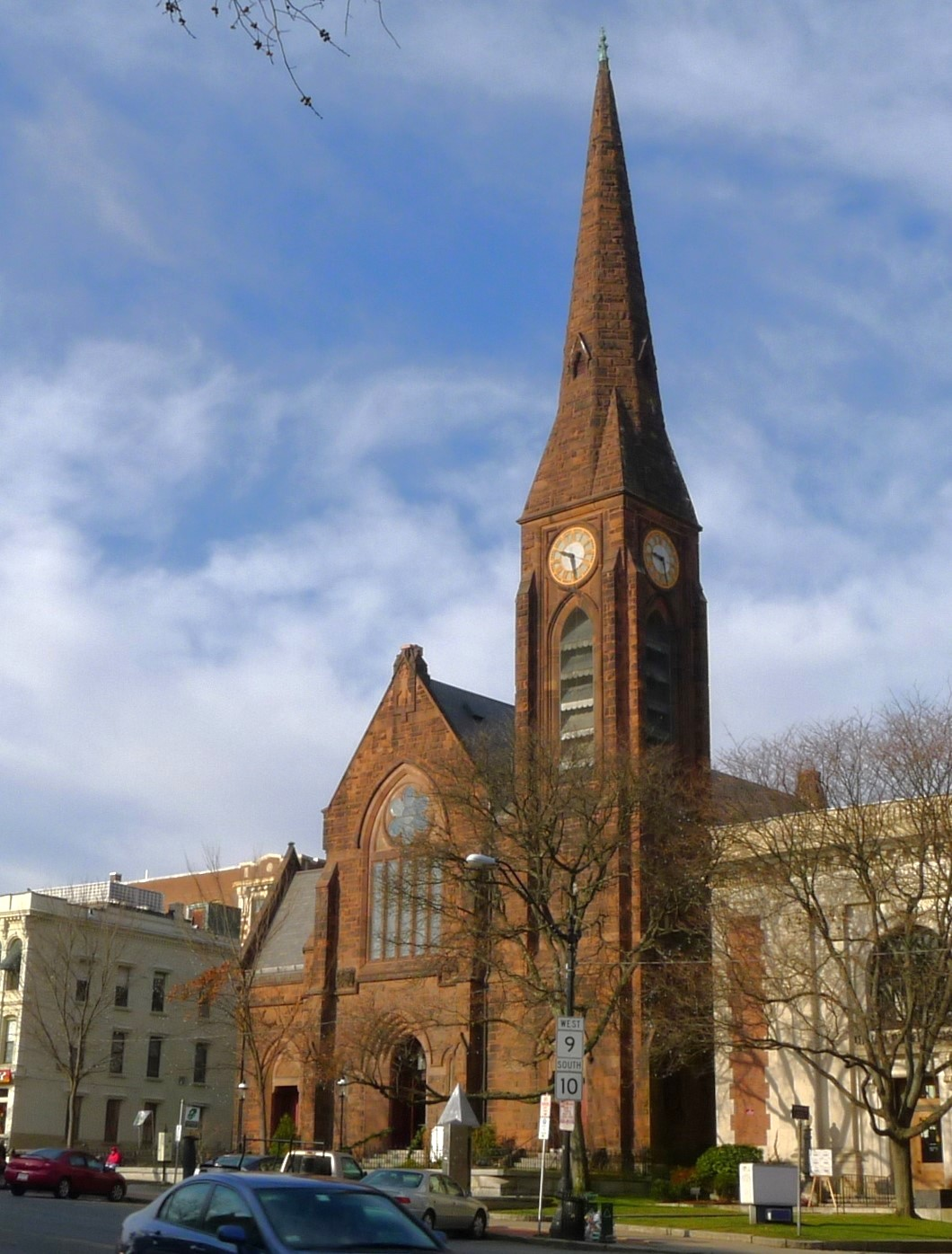
- Church in 2011
- First Church of Christ
- 42°19′8.9″N 72°37′52.2″W
- Address: 129 Main Street
- Country: United States
- Denomination: Congregationalism
- Website: Church website

History
- Founded: 1654
- Dedicated: May 5, 1878

Architecture
- Architect: Peabody & Stearns
- Style: High Victorian Gothic, Romanesque Revival
- Years built: 1877–1878
- Groundbreaking: May 1, 1877
- Completed: April 20, 1878
- Construction cost: $62,900

Specifications
- Width: 76 feet (23.2 m)
- First Church of Christ
- U.S. Historic district – Contributing property
- Coordinates: 42°19′4.1″N 72°38′9.3″W
- Part of: Northampton Downtown Historic District (ID76000270)
- Designated CP: May 17, 1976

The First Church of Christ is a historic congregational church located in Northampton, Massachusetts and a contributing property to the Northampton Downtown Historic District. The current church building is the fifth meetinghouse of the congregation and was built by Peabody & Stearns from 1877 to 1878. It features a clock by E. Howard & Co., a Johnson & Son organ, and stained glass by Louis Comfort Tiffany.

== Design ==
The First Church of Christ is a Gothic Revival style church was built to a design by the Boston-based firm of Peabody & Stearns. Construction started in May 1877 and was completed in April 1878. P. B. Johnson was selected as the building contractor. The exterior of the building was constructed entirely of stone with a slate roof. The foundation was built with granite and the walls with randomly-coursed, quarry-faced Longmeadow brownstone. The church structure boasts a front-gabled nave flanked by cross-gable wings, adorned with high, sharply-pitched parapets. At its southeast corner, there is a buttressed square bell tower, crowned by a broach spire, is also built entirely of stone. The green and gold enameled clockwork located directly below the steeple was designed and built by E. Howard & Co. of Boston and weighs roughly 1,600 pounds. It was originally placed and is still currently owned and maintained by the city of Northampton. The bell was built by William Blake & Co. It weighs 3,179 pounds and is in the key of D.

The church extends 76 feet (23.2 m) on Main Street and 113 feet (34.4 m) on Center Street with a chapel 35 feet (10.7 m) by 76 feet (23.2 m) adjoining it in the rear. The front gable measures 90 feet (27.4 m) tall and is ornamented by a Greek cross. The side walls are 27 feet (8.2 m) tall and feature 12 side windows measuring 17 feet (5.2 m) tall with circular tops. The roof measures 56 feet (17.1 m) in length. The base of the tower is 18 square feet and rises 190 feet (57.9 m) above the sidewalk, and is topped with a 7-foot (2.1 m) high copper finial.

The interior features a spacious main audience room and chapel, with cherry wood pews designed to accommodate around 1,000 individuals. Its stenciled interior was originally adorned in ash wood and built with a hammerbeam roof and iron columns. The interior also contains a Johnson & Son Organ, which is situated directly behind the pulpit and displays a full front of 2,126 decorated pipes. The numerous large stained glass windows were designed by Louis Comfort Tiffany.

The main sanctuary room is 104 feet (31.7 m) by 72 feet (21.9 m) with a row of 6 iron columns (23.5 feet (7.2 m) ft high, 12 inches (30 cm) in diameter, fluted) on each side, the ceiling is 56 ft from the floor in the center. The intricate interior arch woodwork is of southern and yellow pine with the rest of the interior being of ash. There are 126 pews, capable of seating six persons each, which curve commencing on a radius of 100 feet (30.5 m) and decreasing as they approach the pulpit. The floor rises 2 feet (0.6 m) from the pulpit as it approaches the vestibule, which measures 12 feet (3.7 m) by 76 feet (23.2 m). A 22-foot (6.7 m) wide gallery containing 29 pews extends 5 feet (1.5 m) out from the front of the building and rises 8 feet (2.4 m) above the vestibule. The preacher's platform is located at the rear of the building and rises 3 feet (0.9 m) from the floor. The choir-gallery has accommodations for about 20 persons, and is about one foot higher than the pulpit-platform. The entire cost of the building, including furniture, fixtures, and bell, was $62,900.

On November 27, 1888, the church caught fire when plumbers in the roof dropped a lantern. George Washington Cable assisted the firemen with the fire.

Major repairs and restoration took place in 2008 including: new slate roof and insulation, replacement of sanctuary walls and ceiling, and the restoration of the interior walls and wall stenciling to the original design.

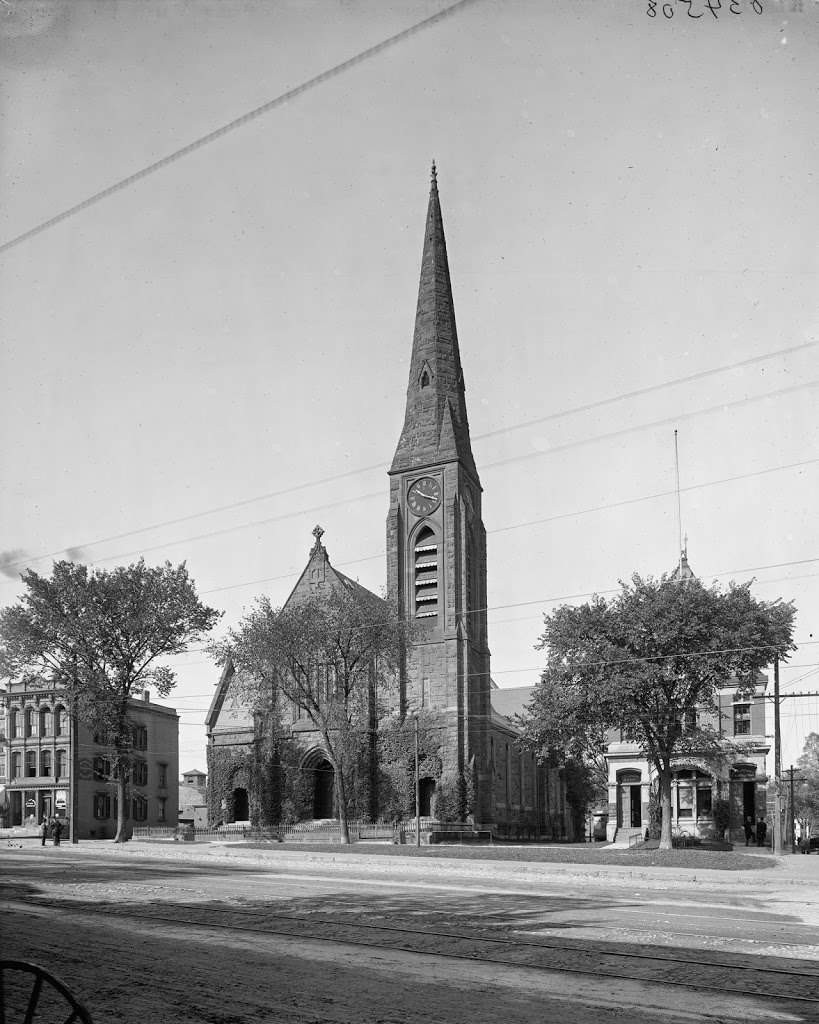
Church in the 1900s

== History ==
Five meetinghouses have been built for the First Church of Christ's congregation. The first meetinghouse was built in 1654 and was a sawn timber house, measuring 26 feet long, 18 feet wide, and 9 feet tall. The second was built in 1661 measuring 42 square feet and not costing over 150 pounds. The third built in 1737. Fourth in 1812 designed by Arthur Benjamin, which was destroyed by a fire in 1876.

The church's congregation was originally established in Northampton by representatives from the Churches of Christ in Dorchester, Roxbury, Springfield, and Hadley.

The first minister of the congregation was Elezear Mather from 1658 to 1669, followed by Solomon Stoddard from 1672 to 1729, then Stoddard's grandson, Jonathan Edwards, the third minister, serving until 1750.

Following the destruction of its fourth meetinghouse in July 1876, the parish convened to initiate plans for reconstruction, setting a budget not to exceed $50,000. Despite receiving numerous architectural proposals, none fit within the allocated budget. Consequently, a five-member building committee consisting of parishioners was formed with L. C. Seeyle being a notable committeeman. The committee tasked Peabody & Stearns, architects of nearby Smith College, with overseeing the project while adhering to cost constraints. Peabody & Stearns devised a Gothic-style design with cost-saving features such as stone construction for the exterior and a slate roof.

The cornerstone of the current church building was taken from a corner of the fourth meetinghouse and placed at the eastern corner of the tower. It measures 23 inches (58 cm) in length by 20 inches (51 cm) in width by 11 inches (28 cm) in height. It is inscribed with "1661–1877"

175 pounds of metal was saved from the 4th meetinghouse bell. The Bevin Brothers used the material to cast 1,200 bells to be sold as mementos.

== Notable people ==
Notable members of the church throughout its history include: Moses Allen, Solomon Allen, (Note: Chosen deacon of the church in 1797. Was missionary of the church from 1804 to 1821 in western New York.) Thomas Allen, William Allen, Isaac C. Bates, Josiah Clark, Charles Augustus Dewey, Timothy Dwight IV, (Note: Member of the church during childhood.) Esther Edwards, Jonathan Edwards, Joseph Hawley, Sylvester Judd, Henry Lyman, William Lyman, Joseph Parsons Jr., Seth Pomeroy, L. Clark Seelye, Solomon Stoddard, Caleb Strong, John Strong, (Note: One of the original members of the church.) Benjamin Tappan, Oliver Warner, Josiah Whitney, and William Dwight Whitney.

== Images ==
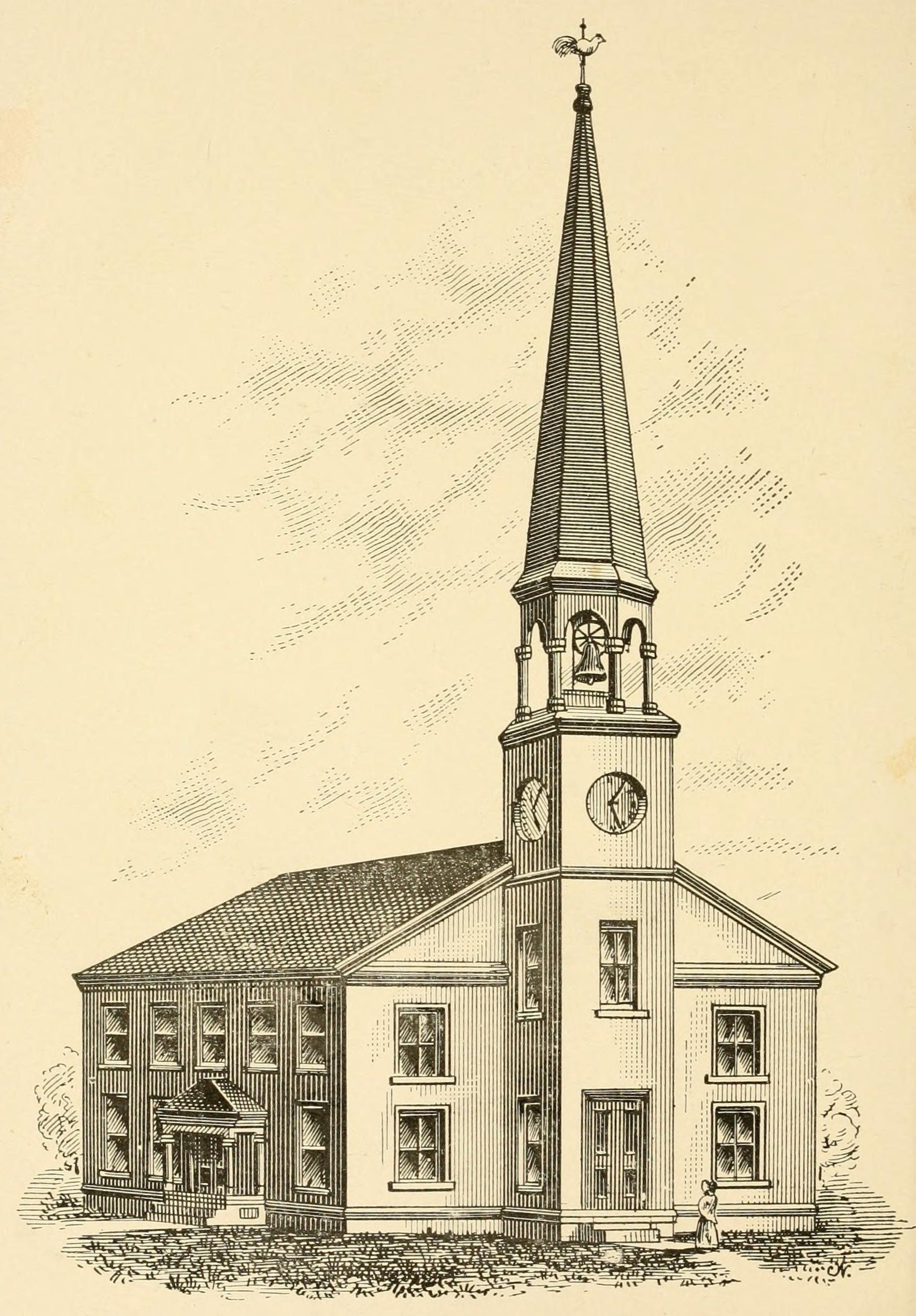
Third Meetinghouse (1737)

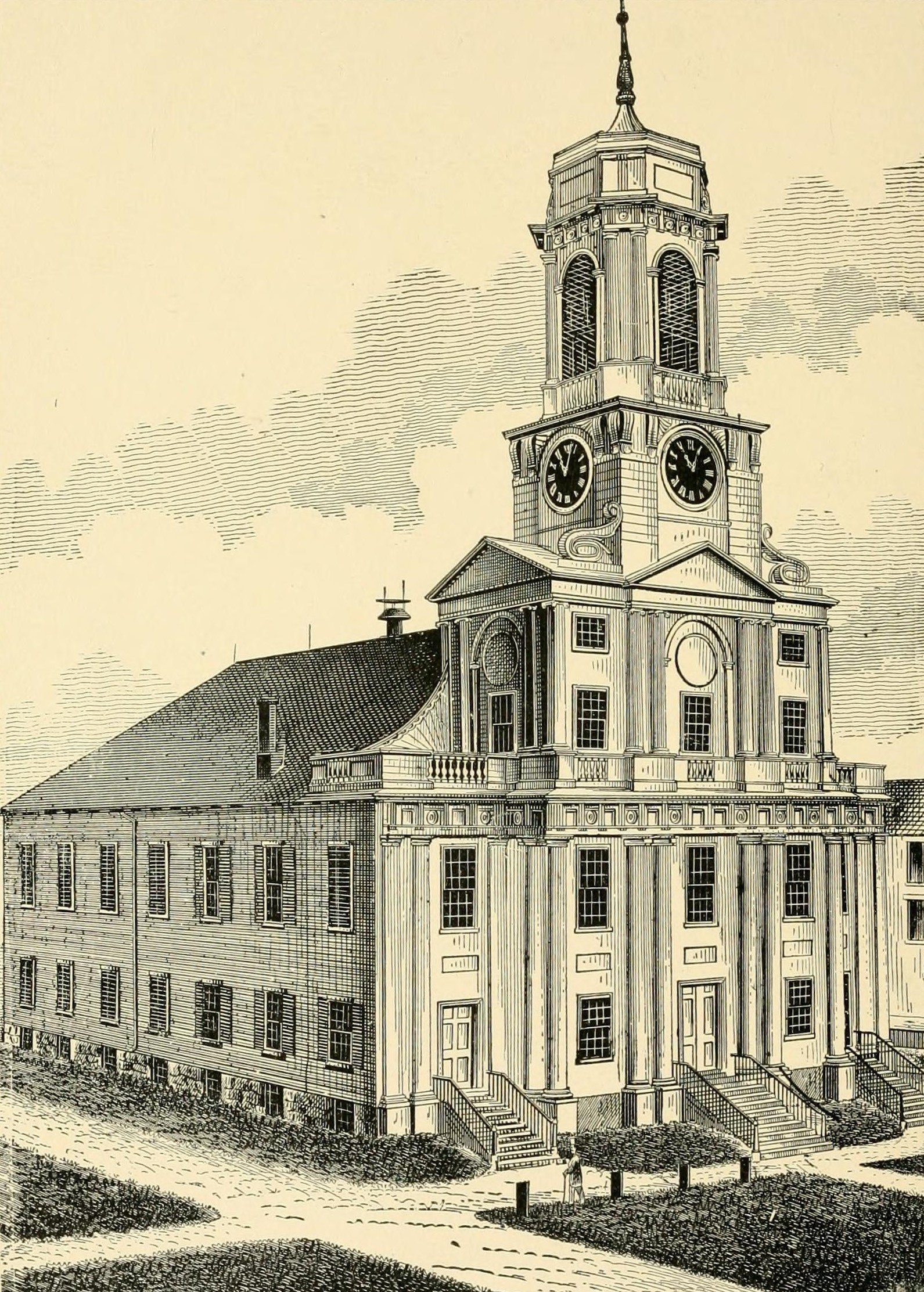
Fourth Meetinghouse (1811)

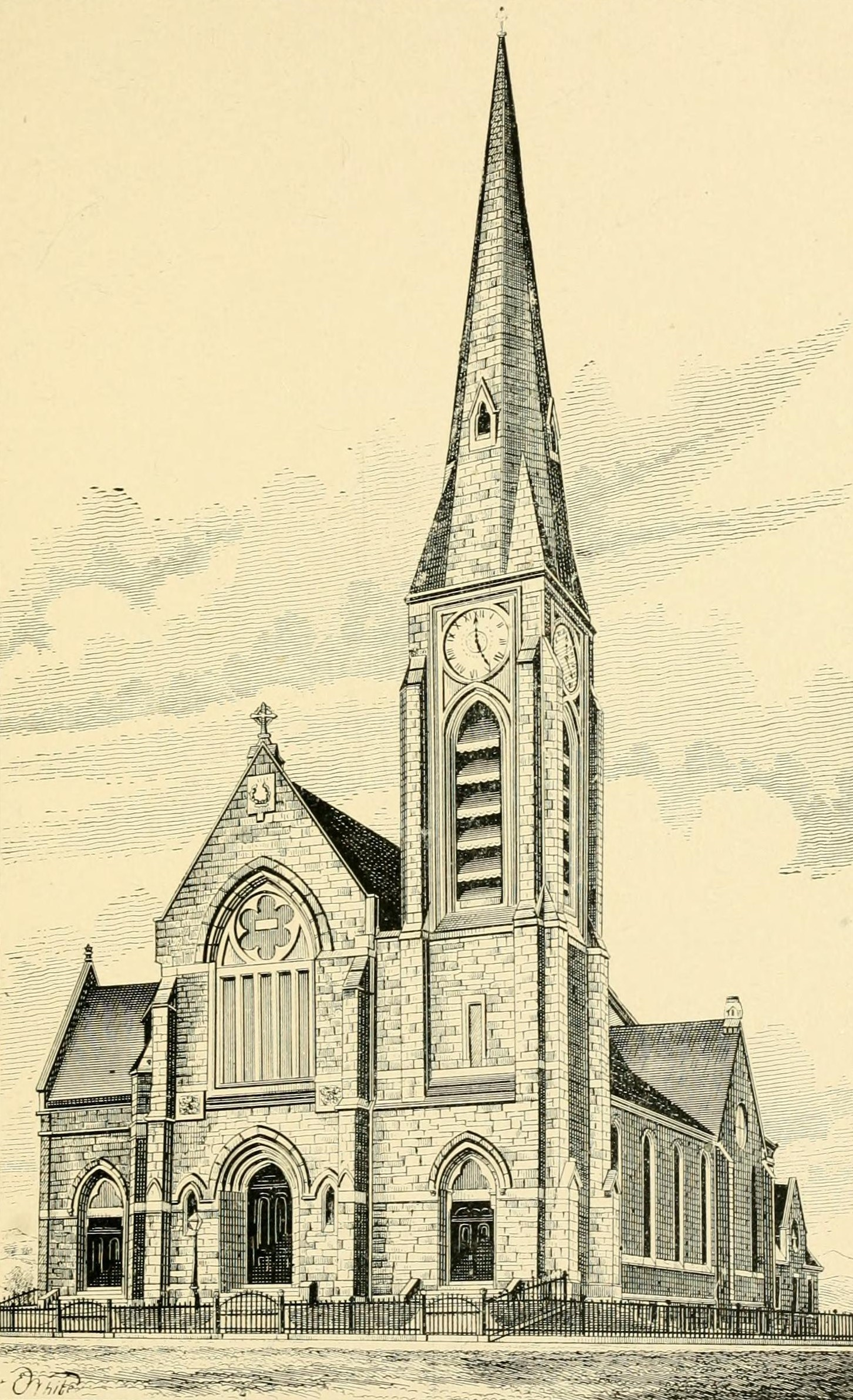
Current Meetinghouse (1878)

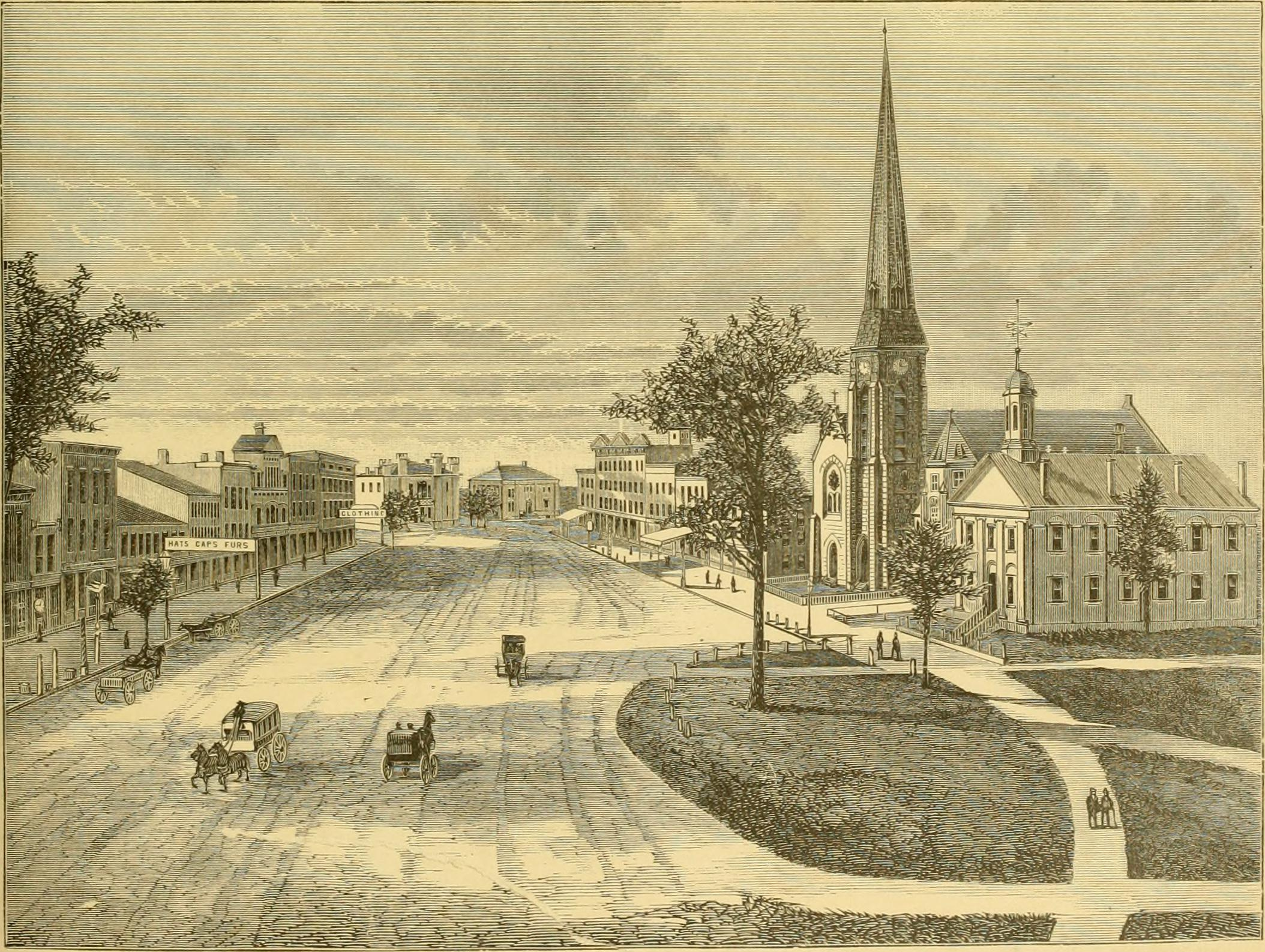
Downtown Northampton (1879)

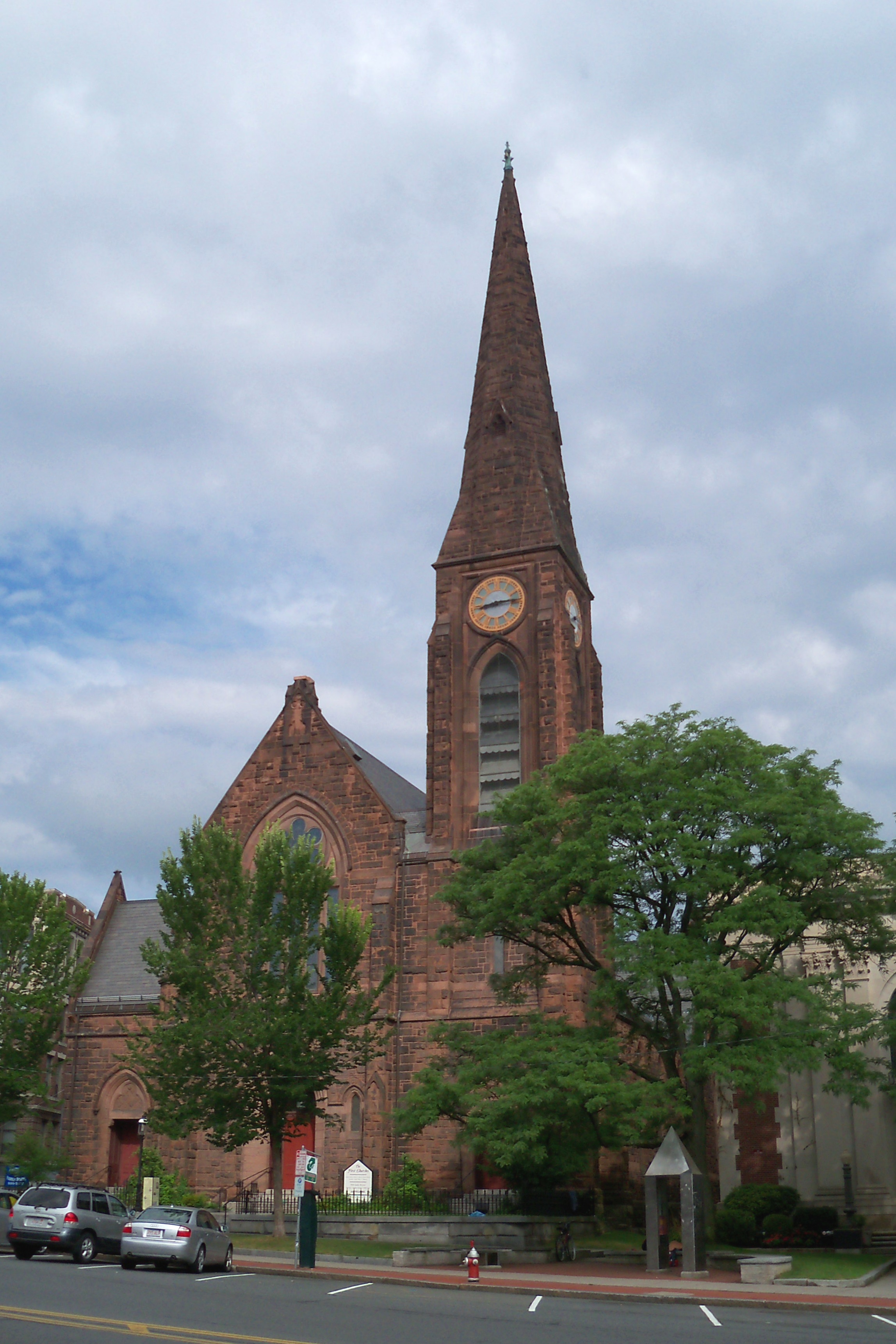
Church in 2013
