= Joseph Parsons Jr. =

American politician

Coat of Arms of Joseph Parsons

Joseph Parsons Jr. (1647–1729) was an early settler and prominent colonial leader in Northampton, Massachusetts.

Parsons Jr. was born in Springfield, Massachusetts on November 1, 1647. His father, Cornet Joseph Parsons Sr., immigrated to America from England around 1635, and was one of the witnesses to the deed that transferred ownership of Springfield from the Native Americans to the English settlers. He later became one of the original settlers of Northampton, Massachusetts. Parson Jr.'s mother, Mary (Bliss) Parsons was accused of witchcraft several decades before the far more notorious Salem Witch Trials, although she was ultimately acquitted.

Parsons Jr. lived most of his life in Northampton. On March 17, 1669, he married Elizabeth Strong, the daughter of John Strong, the lead elder of the church and prominent resident of the town. Parsons Jr. was involved in several business enterprises in and around Northampton, including grist mills, sawmills, and iron. He later became active in politics; in 1696, he was commissioned as one of the four judges on the Hampshire County Court of Common Pleas, which at the time included all of Western Massachusetts. He served in this capacity until 1719. Parsons Jr. also served as a representative in the Massachusetts General Court; he represented Springfield in 1706 and 1708, and Northampton from 1711-1715, 1717, 1721, and 1724. In addition, he held several other minor offices; in 1700, he was appointed as the first town moderator in Northampton history, and he also served as justice of the peace for a number of years.

Throughout most of Parson Jr.'s life in Northampton, Solomon Stoddard was the pastor of the church. However, by 1725 Stoddard was 82 years old and unable to fulfill all of his pastoral duties alone. So, the town voted seven members onto a committee to find a suitable candidate to assist, and upon Stoddard's death, replace him as pastor. Joseph Parsons Jr. was one of the members of this pastoral search committee, which ultimately chose Jonathan Edwards, whose tenure as pastor would lead to the Great Awakening.

Joseph Parsons Jr. died in Northampton in November, 1729.
