= Thomas Allen (chaplain) =

American journalist

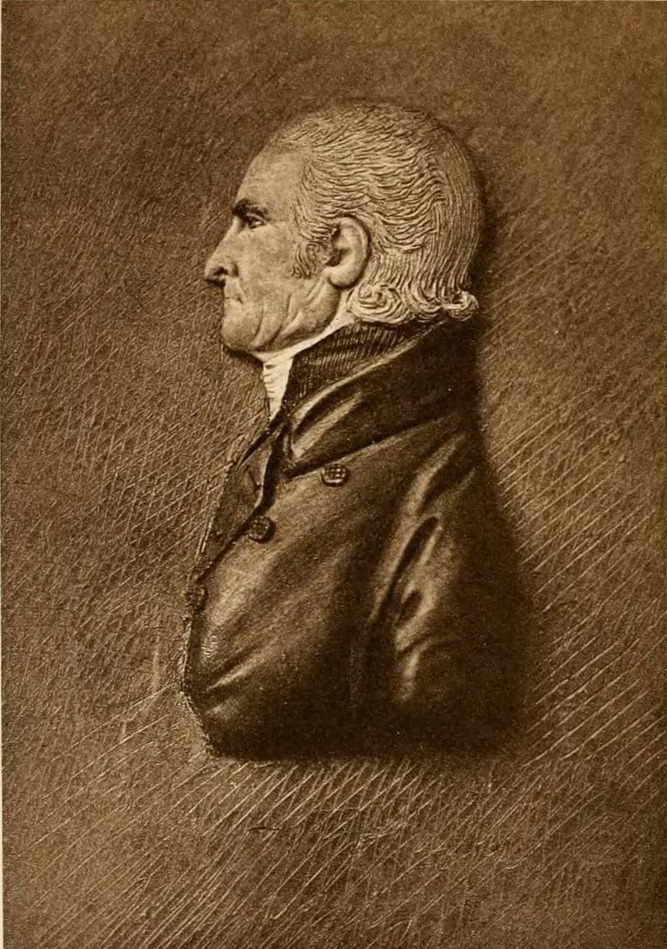
- Born: July 1, 1743
- Died: November 2, 1810 (aged 67)
- Occupation: Priest, missionary, writer, preacher, Minister
- Relatives: Solomon Allen, Moses Allen

Reverend Thomas Allen (January 17, 1743 in Northampton, Massachusetts – April 18, 1810 in Pittsfield, Massachusetts), known as The Fighting Parson, was "chaplain to three Berkshire Regiments during the Revolution and was at Ticonderoga and at the Battle of Bennington where he led a group of soldiers from Pittsfield" described as "a political liberal and a religious conservative."

== Biography ==
Allen graduated from Harvard College in 1762 and then studied theology under Reverend John Hooker. On April 18, 1764, he was ordained the first pastor of the First Congregational Church of Pittsfield, Massachusetts. Still in existence today, he served as pastor for 46 years. His grandson, also named Thomas Allen, was a Congressman from Missouri.

Allen "brought in" a relative to publish The Pittsfield Sun and contributed many editorials.

=== The Fighting Parson ===
Because of his 'pro-Jeffersonian speeches made at church on Sundays", Allen was charged with "treason, rebellion and sedition" but ultimately the charges were dropped.

There is more than one version of how he earned the nickname "The Fighting Parson." One involves his involvement in combat at the Battle of Bennington and the other because, under the altar of his church, he kept a musket.

== Legacy ==
Harriette Merrick Plunkett published his biography, Fighting Parson Allen, in 1897.

Allen's son, William Allen, was a noted biographer and the president of Bowdoin College.
