= Fayette F. Forbes =

North American plant collector and water engineer (1851–1935)

Fayette Frederick Forbes
- Born: May 9, 1851; Buckland, Massachusetts, United States of America
- Died: November 20, 1935 (aged 84); Brookline, Massachusetts, United States of America
- Scientific career
- Fields: Botany.

Signature
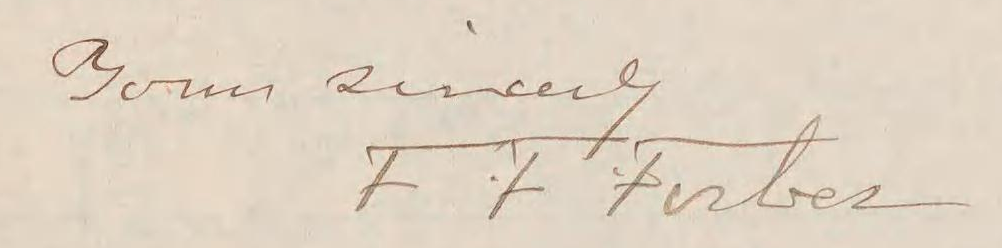

Fayette Frederick Forbes (1851–1935), was a water engineer, plant collector, and botanist with a particular interest in algae and diatoms. At the time of his death he also held the record for the longest-serving public servant in "nearly 100 cities and towns" of the United States of America.

== Life ==
Forbes was born on 9 May 1851 in Buckland, Massachusetts and after completing public schooling, he undertook further studies at Ashfield before entering the scientific department of Williston Seminary at the age of 19. He went on to work at the Holyoke Water Works as a civil engineer, Forbes' obituary in the Mueller Record states that he worked as an instructor at Williston Seminary before working as an engineer for the railroad companies. before working for the Troy & Greenfield Rail Road and the Boston & Albany Rail Road companies. On December 9, 1873, he was employed at the Brookline Water Works, the employer that he would remain with until the end of his life. By 1876 he was promoted to superintendent of the Water Works. During this period, presumably as a part of his duties as superintendent, he studied fresh water algae and diatoms. By the 1890s, he advertised his pre-prepared slides of diatoms, both strew mounts and in carefully arranged mounts. In 1885 Forbes was elected to the membership of the New England Water Works Association, and served on the executive committee, and as the Association's president in 1898. In 1927 he was elected to an honorary membership, and a commemorative award as commissioned in his honour, in 1949.

He developed the water supply infrastructure of Brookline, including a new reservoir, wells, and according to the Mueller Record, in his lifetime he had "originated a method for separating different vegetable organisms which is now popularly known as the Forbes Method." He was particularly interested in water quality, and in 1890 published his research into the growth of algae in water reservoirs, where he concluded that potable water reservoirs should be covered to ensure water quality. He subsequently has been described, in the context of the problem of algal growth in drinking water supplies, as "probably the first to not only study the problem but also correct his system with a cover."

== Legacy ==
His personal herbarium of 16,000 specimen sheets was donated to the Gray Herbarium of Harvard University, and his Nachet-type drum compound microscope is held by the Ernst-Lewis Collection of Microscopes at Harvard University. Other botanical specimens are held by the New England Botanical Club, the National Herbarium of Victoria, Royal Botanic Gardens Victoria, the Auckland War Memorial Museum, the Royal Horticultural Society in the United Kingdom, and the Natural History Museum, Oslo.

He named the following species and hybrids:

- Salix subsericea, F. F. Forbes
- Viola Brittoniana X lanceolata F.F.Forbes

The following species and varieties was named in his honour:

- Salix neoforbesii Toepffer (a synonym of Salix × subsericea Döll)
- Viola incognita var. forbesii Brainerd (a synonym of Viola incognita Brainerd)

== Standard author abbreviation ==
The standard author abbreviation F.F.Forbes is used to indicate this person as the author when citing a botanical name.
