= John Strong (colonist) =

Colonial religious leader

John Strong (1610–1699) was an English-born New England colonist, politician, Puritan church leader, tanner, and one of the founders of Windsor, Connecticut, and Northampton, Massachusetts, as well as the progenitor of nearly all the Strong families in what is now the United States. He was referred to as Elder John Strong because he was an Elder in the church.

== Life ==
Coat of Arms of John Strong

Strong was born in about 1610 in Chard, Somerset, England and emigrated to Massachusetts with his pregnant wife and a one-year-old child in 1635 aboard the sailing ship Hopewell. During the 70-day sea voyage, his wife, Marjory Deane (md. 1632) had a baby while they were still at sea. She and their infant child died within two months of their arrival. With one-year-old son John Strong Jr. to take care of, John Sr. married sixteen-year-old Mary & John (1630) passenger Abigail Ford, daughter of Thomas Ford and Elizabeth Charde, in December 1635. They settled originally in Hingham, Massachusetts, a New-Plymouth Colony, in 1635. In 1638 he was made a "Freeman" (eligible to vote in town and colony elections and serve in the church), and went to Taunton, Massachusetts. While in Taunton, Strong represented the town in the General Court of Plymouth Colony for four years, from 1641 to 1644.

He later moved to Windsor, Connecticut, on the Connecticut River where he was a leading figure in the new Connecticut colony. In 1659 he moved 40 miles further up the river to the Connecticut River town of Northampton, Massachusetts—then a frontier town surrounded by Nipmuck and Pocumtuc Indian nations about 100 miles (160 km) inland from Boston. One of the early settlers of the town, he operated a tannery for many years, helped defend the town against Indian attacks during King Philip's War (1675-1676) and also played an important role in town and church affairs.

In 1661, John Strong was one of the eight men who founded the First Church of Northampton. Of their number, Eleazer Mather, the older brother of Boston minister Increase Mather, was chosen as the first pastor. Two years later, 1663, Strong was ordained an elder of the church. The Puritan pastor Mather died in 1669, and Strong was tasked with finding a suitable minister to replace him. The following year, he and several other church leaders extended a call to Solomon Stoddard, who formally accepted in 1672, and was ordained by John Strong. Stoddard served as pastor for many years, until his death in 1729, and was succeeded by his grandson, Jonathan Edwards, whose subsequent ministry in Northampton would play a major role in the Great Awakening.

John Strong died on April 14, 1699, at Northampton and is buried at the Bridge Street Cemetery, Northampton.
