= Solomon Allen =

American preacher (1751–1821)

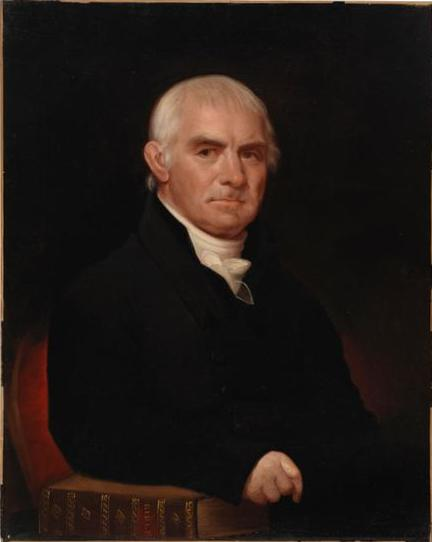
- portrait by Ezra Ames
- Born: February 23, 1751; Northampton
- Died: January 28, 1821 (aged 69); New York City
- Occupation: Itinerant preacher
- Relatives: Thomas Allen, Moses Allen
- Rank: Private, major
- Branch: Continental Army

Solomon Allen (February 23, 1751 – January 28, 1821) was an officer during the American Revolutionary War and itinerant preacher.

Solomon Allen was born on February 23, 1751 in Northampton, Massachusetts. He was a brother of Moses Allen and Thomas Allen, who were chaplains in the revolutionary army, while he fought as a soldier and rose to the rank of major. As lieutenant he commanded the guard that took Major Andre to West Point. After the war he was engaged in suppressing Shays' rebellion. At the age of forty he became a religious convert, and at fifty began the life of a missionary preacher. For twenty years he circulated among the new settlements of western New York, where he was greatly respected for his zealous devotion and self-sacrifice. A "Sketch of the Last Hours of Solomon Allen" was written by J. N. Danforth.

Solomon Allen died on 28 January 1821 in New York.
