= Williston Northampton School =

School in Easthampton, Massachusetts, US

Location
- 19 Payson Avenue; Easthampton, Massachusetts 01027; United States; 42°16′00.33″N 72°40′18.41″W

Information
- Other name: Williston
- Type: Private, day and boarding college-preparatory school
- Established: 1841; 185 years ago
- NCES School ID: 00604341
- Head of school: Robert Hill
- Teaching staff: 99
- Grades: 7–12
- Gender: Co-educational
- Enrollment: 435 (2023-2024)
- Student to teacher ratio: 6:1
- Campus size: 125 acres (0.51 km^{2})
- Colors: Blue and green
- Song: O Williston
- Mascot: Williston Wildcat
- Newspaper: The Willistonian
- Website: www.williston.com

Williston Northampton School (simply referred to as Williston) is a private college-preparatory day and boarding school in Easthampton, Massachusetts, United States. It was established in 1841. Tuition for the 2023-2024 academic year is $74,000 for boarding students, and $51,000 for day students.

== History ==
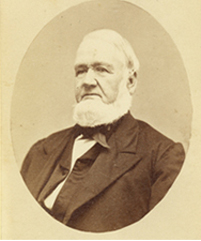
Samuel Williston.

Williston Seminary was founded by Samuel Williston (1795–1874), a wealthy button manufacturer, in February 1841; the school opened that December, with a dedication address by Mark Hopkins, president of nearby Williams College. The idea of opening a new academy in the neighborhood had been in the air ever since the closing in 1834 of the Round Hill School in nearby Northampton. In its early days, there was no arrangement of studies by terms and the students were not classified. Luther Wright, its principal from 1841 to 1849, believed it was desirable to have his pupils study together in a single room under his direction. However, the school's student population grew rapidly and the one-room schoolhouse scheme was soon no longer practicable as more instructors and new buildings were added. By the 1850s, the schools campus was dominated by three large buildings: North Hall, Middle Hall and South Hall. For many years, the school was co-educational, with the students divided and taught separately in male and female departments, but in 1864, the female division was discontinued.

The seminary comprised two faculties: classical and scientific. With the departure in 1863 of the school's second president, Josiah Clark, a classicist Greek and Latin scholar who had vigorously fought against the expansion of the English department, the school's curriculum began to be modernized. Samuel Williston remained the dominant influence in the school's growth until his death in 1874. In the late 19th century, the dual curricula had evolved into a more modern comprehensive course (e.g. with "scientific and preparatory departments"), and in 1924 the school was renamed Williston Academy. During the 1960s, Williston began to examine possibilities for coeducation and in 1971, merged with its longtime sister school, the Northampton School for Girls, to become the Williston Northampton School. Starting as a preparatory academy for those seeking the clergy, the school now has a core college preparatory curriculum.

== Students and faculty ==
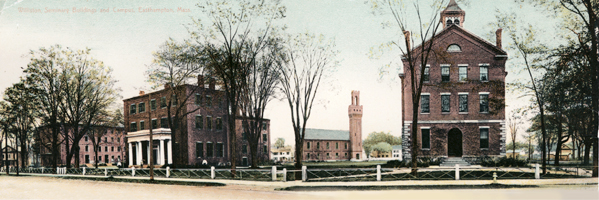
Old Campus, Williston.

Williston Northampton encompasses the middle school (7th and 8th grade) and the upper school (9th-12th and postgraduate).

The school had 486 students in the 2017-2018 academic year with 58.6 teachers on a full-time equivalent basis, and a student–teacher ratio of 8.3. Its boarding students come from 25 states and 30 countries around the world. International students come from eastern Asia, the Middle East and Europe.

== The campus ==
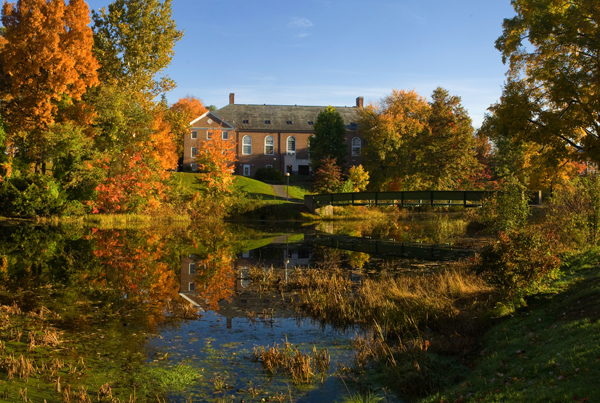
Ford Hall and Birch Dining Commons, viewed from the Williston pond.

The 125-acre (0.51 km^{2}) campus is located in Easthampton, Massachusetts, within view of Mount Tom.

Many of the school's buildings and dorms are situated around the main quad. In 2017, construction began on a new dorm across from the main part of campus. The Schoolhouse, a former factory building remodeled in the 1950s to resemble the old schoolhouse building on the original Main Street campus, holds English and math classes and also contains administrative offices. In 1996, the former gymnasium, originally built in 1924, was transformed into the Reed Campus Center. In 2019, the athletic center was named the Sabina Cain Family Athletic Center. The Dodge Room is the setting for many guest speakers, including the school's Writers' Workshop series.

After a fire destroyed the school's theater building in 1994, it was rebuilt, on the same site adjacent to the science laboratories in Scott Hall. The Williston Theatre is a 250-seat performance space.

The Robert Clapp Memorial Library is located near the center of the campus. The library has a 40,000+ collection.

The Middle School is housed in the Whitaker-Bement Center. It was created in 1972 in honor of the Northampton School for Girls founders Sarah B. Whitaker and Dorothy M. Bement. The Phillips Stevens Chapel (1964) hosts both the weekly assembly in its traditional chapel and language classes in its basement.

== Tuition ==
Tuition for the 2023-2024 academic year is $74,000 for boarding students, and $51,000 for day students. Tuition for the middle school is $41,000.

== Notable alumni ==
- Ram Dass (born Richard Alpert), spiritual teacher, former academic and clinical psychologist, and author
- Shawn Amos, songwriter, blues singer, record producer and digital marketing entrepreneur
- Hiram Bingham II, missionary
- Richard M. Blatchford, U.S. Army general
- Boon Tuan Boon-Itt, early leader in the Protestant Christian community of Thailand
- David Hillhouse Buel, president of Georgetown University
- Edward P. Bullard Jr., engineer
- Bryan Callen, stand-up comedian, actor, writer and podcaster
- Abiram Chamberlain, politician
- William S. Clark, professor of chemistry, botany and zoology
- Charles Robert Connell, congressman
- Winthrop M. Crane, politician and businessman
- Henry deForest, railroad executive, capitalist and industrialist
- William Austin Dickinson, lawyer
- Cleveland Hoadley Dodge, capitalist and philanthropist
- Ann Dowd, actress
- William C. Dudley, economist
- P. D. Eastman, screenwriter, children's author, and illustrator
- Charles H. Eglee, film and television screenwriter and producer
- Mitch Epstein, photographer
- Charles Evans Jr., film producer and documentary film director
- Vic Fazio, congressman
- Fayette F. Forbes, water engineer and botanist
- George L. Frost, lawyer
- Ashley Gearing, country singer
- Michael Goldbloom, lawyer, publisher, and academic administrator
- William J. Granfield, congressman
- Brad Hall, actor, comedian, director and writer
- G. Stanley Hall, psychologist and educator
- John Manning Hall, lawyer and Connecticut state legislator
- Kaitlin Hopkins, stage, screen, and television actress
- Horatio G. Knight, politician, manufacturer and philanthropist
- Tony Lavelli, NBA player
- William Leroy, Reality TV Host
- Selah Merrill, Congregationalist clergyman
- Asher Miner, U.S. Army brigadier general and prominent businessman in Wilkes-Barre, Pennsylvania
- Kirk Minihane, radio and podcast host
- Antonio Moreno, actor and film director
- Shannon O'Brien, politician
- Charles Henry Parkhurst, clergyman and social reformer
- Steve Porter, music video producer, remixer and DJ
- Edward Clark Potter, sculptor
- Lyman W. Redington, attorney and politician
- Patrick Rissmiller, NHL player
- Elihu Root, lawyer and statesman
- Luther Ely Smith, lawyer and civic booster
- Charles Burt Sumner, minister and founder of Pomona College
- William Stanley Jr., physicist
- Henry Stockbridge Jr., congressman
- George Crockett Strong, U.S. Civil War general
- Robert J. Samuelson, journalist
- Lucy Thurber, playwright
- Henry Clay Trumbull, clergyman and author
- William Collins Whitney, political leader and financier
- Agus Gumiwang Kartasasmita, Minister of Industry in the Republic of Indonesia
- Gabby Thomas, Gold medal winning olympic athlete - 2024 - Paris
- Filip Rebrača, professional basketball player

== Notable faculty ==
- Barry Moser, visual artist
- Amos Alonzo Stagg, former football coach
- James Morris Whiton, linguist
