= Samuel Williston (button-maker) =

Button manufacturer and philanthropist

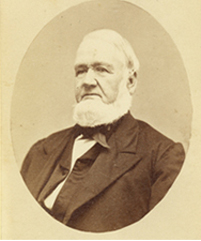

Samuel Williston (1795–1874) was a farmer who started the manufacture of covered buttons in Easthampton, Massachusetts. These were initially made by hand as a cottage industry but he organised mechanisation of the process and established a substantial factory in Haydenville. This prospered and he went on to became a great businessman and philanthropist, establishing and endowing institutions such as Williston Seminary and Amherst College. He was a trustee of such institutions and also served in the Massachusetts General Court as a representative and senator.

His adopted son, Lyman Richards Williston, had a son who took the same name and became famous as a professor of law.
