= Josiah Clark =

American educator (1814–1878)

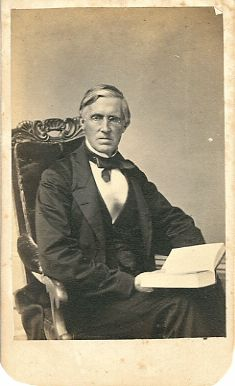
Clark in 1862

Josiah Clark (February 7, 1814 – May 30, 1878) was an American classicist who served as the second principal of the Williston Seminary and one of the first professors at Smith College.

Clark was born in Leicester, Massachusetts, February 7, 1814, the eldest son of Rev. Josiah Clark (Williams College, 1809) and Asenath, daughter of Nathaniel Edwards of Northampton, Massachusetts. His father remained in Leicester as preceptor of the Leicester Academy there until 1818, and then removed to Rutland, Massachusetts, where he was pastor until his death in 1845.

He graduated from Yale College in 1833. From 1833 to 1835, Clark was the principal of an academy in Westminster, Maryland, and for the next two years a teacher in the University of Maryland at Baltimore. He then studied theology in the Andover Theological Seminary, supplementing the usual course with an additional year of study. In 1841 he became an associate preceptor in Leicester Academy, and later the preceptor, remaining there until 1849, when he was made principal of Williston Seminary in Easthampton, Massachusetts. This position he retained until 1863, when he removed to Northampton. There he continued to teach, at first in the Round Hill School, and afterwards receiving pupils in his house, chiefly those preparing in the classics for admission to college. In the summer of 1875 the Smith College for women was opened in Northampton, and Dr. Clark (the degree of LL. D. was given him by Yale College in July 1875) entered on the duties of the Professorship of Latin and Greek. In August 1876, he was prostrated (perhaps in consequence of a partial sunstroke) by an obscure disease of the brain, and after a lingering illness died at his residence in Northampton, May 30, 1878, aged 64 years.

He was married on November 21, 1842, to his cousin, Lucy Edwards, daughter of David L. Dewey, of Northampton, who survived him without children.

== Notes ==
This article incorporates public domain material from the Yale Obituary Record.
