= Mary Bliss Parsons =

American woman accused of witchcraft

- Born: March 16, 1628; Gloucestershire, England
- Died: January 29, 1712 (aged 83); Springfield, Massachusetts
- Known for: Witchcraft
- Spouse: Joseph Parsons (m. 1646)
- Children: 11

Mary Bliss Parsons (March 16, 1628 – January 29, 1712), also known as Goody Parsons, was an American woman who was accused of witchcraft, but was exonerated, in 17th-century Massachusetts.

== Background ==
Parsons was born to Thomas and Margaret Bliss (née Hulings) in Gloucestershire, England in 1628. Her family later immigrated to Hartford, Connecticut, where she married Joseph Parsons on November 2, 1646. The couple later moved to Springfield, Massachusetts. In 1655, Joseph Parsons purchased a land tract from the local Native Americans in what would become Northampton. Parsons frequently negotiated for land from the Nonotuck, Agawam, and other Indigenous peoples of the region under circumstances that have come under scrutiny as an instrumental part of the colonization of the area and partial displacement of Native people by Puritan settlers.

The Parsonses became financially successful members of the Northampton community, owning property in Springfield, Hadley, Massachusetts and Boston as well as in Northampton.

== The Feud ==
In the early 1650s a feud developed between the Parsonses and a neighboring family, the Bridgmans. Parsons was said to have a strong personality, which had led to rumors following her from Springfield. Unlike the Parsons, the Bridgmans were struggling financially. In addition, Mary Parsons had several healthy children while Sarah Bridgman had lost several children. Mary Parsons gave birth to the first child born in the new settlement of Northampton, while the Bridgmans grieved the first recorded death. Mary's fifth child, Ebenezer, was born in May of 1655, while Sarah's infant son died in 1656. People in the town started blaming Parsons for the death of livestock and injuries to people. Bridgman began to spread rumours about Parsons, claiming that she had threatened her son and that she was a witch. When Parsons' mother confronted Bridgman, Bridgman claimed to have heard a story that Parsons had cursed a blind man’s daughter in Springfield, causing the girl to have fits.

== The Slander Trial ==
In 1656 Joseph Parsons filed slander charges against Sarah Bridgman on behalf of his wife in the trial Parsons v. Bridgman. In other contexts, Joseph was not so sympathetic to Mary. They were "frequently and notoriously at odds with one another," as one scholar puts it, with local records reflecting testimony that Joseph tried to confine Mary to their house in Springfield, and then had locked her in the basement, and that he was once beating one of their children "unmercifully" in public when Mary intervened, trying to stop the beating, reassuring Joseph that "she had beaten [the child] before." In the trial, he charged that Bridgman had spread rumors about Parsons, insinuating that she was a witch. Testimony from Bridgman and witness made it clear that rumors had been circulating; according to a descendant and some contemporaneous court records, these rumors were fueled by jealousy and resentment of the Parsons family's success. Mary Parsons’s mother, Margaret Bliss, testified that Bridgman told her that Parsons was a witch.

Happenings in Springfield from years before were also brought before the court, such as Parsons in a ‘fit’ moving through water but not getting wet, and walking around at night, sometimes with an unknown woman that was thought to be a Spirit.

The court ultimately ruled in favor of Parsons. Bridgman was ordered to make a public apology and pay a fine and court costs.

== The Witchcraft Trial ==
In 1674, Parsons was charged with witchcraft after a daughter of Sarah Bridgman, Mary Bartlett, died at the age of 22 in July 1674 and Bartlett's husband and father formally accused Parsons of witchcraft around the death.

On January 5, 1675, the county magistrates ordered a search of Parsons’ body for "Witches' marks," no record of the examination survives. Mary gave testimony on her own behalf in Northampton. In March of the same year, Parsons was temporarily sent to prison while awaiting trial. The jury in Boston acquitted Parsons of witchcraft on May 13, 1675.

== Aftermath ==
Despite Parsons's acquittal in Boston, the witchcraft rumors persisted in Northampton. In 1679 or 1680, the Parsons family moved back to Springfield. Mary's husband Joseph died on October 9th, 1683, leaving behind a substantial estate of £2,088 (approximately $500,000 today).

However, the rumors followed Parsons back to Springfield. In 1702, a Black woman preserved in historical memory as "Betty Negro" told Parsons's grandson that his grandmother was a witch. The Parsons family held a trial in which Betty was accused of "bad language striking" Mary’s grandson, in telling the boy that his grandmother was a witch and his mother was "half a witch.” Betty was sentenced to public flagellation. “We find her very culpable for her base tongue and words as aforesaid,” the court record says. “We sentence said Betty to be well whipped on the naked body by the constable with ten lashes well laid on: which was performed accordingly by constable Thomas Bliss.”

Mary Parsons also appears to have enslaved a Black man named Tobee the year before her death in Springfield. Tobee is listed in local records as the "servant" of the "Widow Mary Parsons" at his death in December 1711, but local historians indicate that the term servant in this time and era was a euphemism for an enslaved person. Mary was ruled incompetent the year of Tobee's death. Parsons died in Springfield at age 83, on January 29, 1712.

== Children ==
1. Joseph, 1 Nov. 1647 - 29 Nov. 1729 - he would later be a judge in New Hampshire.
2. Benjamin, 22 Jan. - 22 June 1649
3. John, 14 Aug. 1650 - 15 April 1728
4. Samuel, 23 Jan. 1652 - 12 Nov. 1734
5. Ebenezer, 1 May 1655 - 8 Sept. 1675
6. Jonathan, 6 June 1657 - 19 Oct. 1694
7. David, 30 April 1659 - same.
8. Mary, 27 June 1661 - 23 Aug 1711
9. Hannah, 1 Aug. 1663 - 1 April 1739
10. Abigail, 3 Sept. 1666 - 27 June 1689
11. Esther (recorded as Hester), 4 Dec. 1672 - 30 May 1760

== Sources used ==
- Newton, Maud (2023). Ancestor Trouble: A Reckoning and a Reconciliation. Random House. ISBN 9780812987492.
