= Northampton Downtown Historic District =

Historic district in Massachusetts, United States

- U.S. National Register of Historic Places
- U.S. Historic district
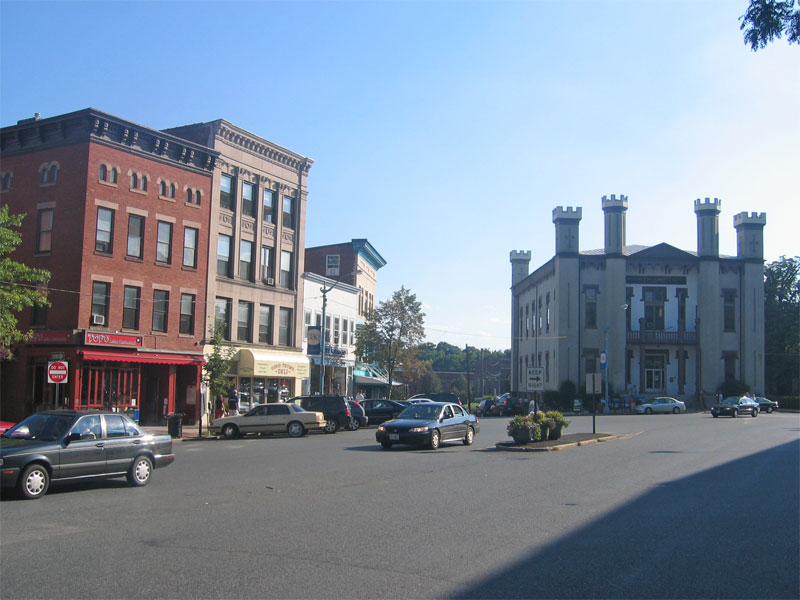
- Main Street

- Location within Massachusetts Location within the United States
- Location: Northampton, Massachusetts
- Coordinates: 42°19′15″N 72°37′45″W
- Area: 82.4 acres (33.3 ha)
- Architectural style: Classical Revival, Late Victorian
- NRHP reference No.: 76000270 (original); 85001464 (increase)

Significant dates
- Added to NRHP: May 17, 1976
- Boundary increase: July 3, 1985

The Northampton Downtown Historic District encompasses most of the central business district of Northampton, Massachusetts. This area, which has been a center of commerce and industry in the area since colonial days, extends from the railroad tracks on the east side of the downtown, and west along Main Street to its junction with West Street and Elm Street. When the district was first listed on the National Register of Historic Places, it ended at the railroad tracks, and included properties on a number of other downtown streets; this was extended in 1985 to include a few properties just east of the railroad tracks on and near Bridge Street. The district includes such notable buildings as the 1891 Academy of Music Theatre, the First Church of Christ, and Northampton's castle-like City Hall.

Northampton was settled (and incorporated as a town) in 1653, and was reincorporated as a city in 1883. Until the mid-19th century, it was essentially a rural market town, which also served as the county seat of Hampshire County. Main Street was from the start its center of civic and economic affairs, even as industrialization and changes in transportation brought economic development. The downtown's first major period of growth was after the American Civil War, spurred by the arrival of railroads and by the development of industry along the Mill River. A fire in 1870 destroyed surviving wood-frame commercial buildings on Main Street, and most subsequent commercial growth was in masonry. A second period of growth in the 1890s eliminated most of the remaining residences on Main Street west of the railroad.

== See also ==
- National Register of Historic Places listings in Hampshire County, Massachusetts
