= USS Northampton =

USS Northampton has been the name of three ships in the United States Navy:

- USS Northampton (SP-670), a wooden motor boat acquired in 1917 and returned to its owner in 1918.
- USS Northampton (CA-26), lead ship of the Northampton-class cruisers, commissioned in 1930 and was sunk at the Battle of Tassafaronga in 1942.
- USS Northampton (CLC-1) was a command ship that was originally laid down as heavy cruiser CA-125 in 1944. Work on her was suspended the next year prior to launching, then recommenced in 1948 when it was decided to make her a command ship. She was launched in 1951, commissioned in 1953 and served until 1970.

== Other uses ==
- During World War II, the U.S. Naval Reserve Midshipmen's School at Smith College in Northampton, Massachusetts, which trained officers of the Women's Reserve of the U.S. Naval Reserve (WAVES), was nicknamed "USS Northampton".
