= Solomon Stoddard =

American pastor (1643–1729)

- Born: September 27, 1643; Boston
- Died: February 11, 1729; Northampton
- Education: Harvard University
- Occupations: Cleric, librarian, Minister
- Spouse: Esther Warham Mather Stoddard

Solomon Stoddard (September 27, 1643, baptized October 1, 1643 – February 11, 1729) was the pastor of the First Church of Christ in Northampton, Massachusetts Bay Colony. He succeeded Rev. Eleazer Mather, and later married his widow around 1670. Stoddard significantly liberalized church policy while promoting more power for the clergy, decrying drinking and extravagance, and urging the preaching of hellfire and the Judgment. The major religious leader of what was then the frontier, he was known as the "Puritan Pope of the Connecticut River valley" and was concerned with the lives (and the souls) of second-generation Puritans. The well-known theologian Jonathan Edwards (1703–1758) was his grandson, the son of Solomon's daughter, Esther Stoddard Edwards. Stoddard was the first librarian at Harvard University and the first person in American history known by that title.

== Religious leader ==
Stoddard was an influential religious leader in colonial New England, and was the grandfather of the prominent theologian Rev. Jonathan Edwards.

For 55 years, Stoddard occupied an unparalleled position in the Connecticut River Valley region of Massachusetts. His theology was not widely accepted in Boston, but was popular on the frontier. Opponents sometimes referred to him as "Pope" Stoddard, rhetorically placing him in the locally detested camp of the Roman Catholic Church. Yet what started as an insult from Increase Mather changed as his presbyterian influences over Congregational church government grew. Stoddard insisted that the sacrament of the Lord's Supper should be available to all who lived outwardly pious lives and had a good reputation in the community, even if they weren't full members of the church. This was his attempt to save his church from a "dying religion", and was the cause of great theological controversy in 18th century New England (see also Halfway Covenant).

Although in acknowledging his grandfather as a "sort of deity", Edwards minimised his influence over Northampton, being dismissive of the oracle who had caused great wounds and split the church. Nevertheless, years later Timothy Dwight would assess his impact as more profound than any other clergyman over a thirty-year period.

== Early life ==
Stoddard was born in Boston on September 26, 1643, to Anthony Stoddard, a wealthy Boston merchant, and Mary Downing (sister of Sir George Downing (after whom Downing Street in London is named), niece to Governor John Winthrop). He was baptized on October 1 at the First Church, Boston. As such, he was born into the highest stratum of aristocratic New England, but his mother died suddenly in June 1647, when he was still an infant.

He attended Cambridge Grammar School, probably the best one in New England "to instruct youth so far as they may be fitted for Universities", "under the most reputable" Elijah Corlet, Oxon MA. (Note: "our colledge and Country has received so many of its worthy men, that he is himself worthy to has his name celebrated in our Church History", wrote Cotton Mather, Magnalia Christi Americana, (2 vols, London, 1702))

Going up in 1658 he aimed to "lead an honest, sober and Godly life," permitted to speak only Latin, "diligently avoid being inoffensive in word or gesture." In the rigid disciplinary world of the Puritan Theocracy, alcohol was forbidden, except for a weak beer, as was tobacco. The "poenal laws" included expulsion for blasphemy and "prophanation of the Lords Day Ordinances". He graduated BA from this "elite gathering" at Harvard College in July 1662. The MA during the next three years was 'Puritan casuistry' becoming an expert in a systematic study of theology adhering to the fundamentals of Holy Scripture. Rational theology was not pure Calvinism, but divined from Covenant; it resembled philosophy, offering a distilled thesis of disputation.

A Fellow and Tutor of Harvard Corporation for a year, he was then chosen in March 1667, to be the "first American librarian known to history by that title" when he was appointed "Library keeper", and Library Laws were enacted specifying that he should keep the Library "duly swept" and the books "clean and orderly." The following is found in the records of Harvard College:

March 27, 1667, "Mr Solomon Stoddard was chosen Library keeper." "For the rectifying of ye Library & Rules for the Library Keeper", sixteen "orders were made." "No person resident in the College, except an Overseer", and "no Schollar in the College, under a Senior", could borrow a book, and "no one under master of Art (unless it be a fellow) ... without the allowance of the President."

It was there that he studied the British Presbyterian history with a maverick perspective on order from chaos. To improve his health, Stoddard went to Barbados and served as a chaplain to Governor Daniel Searle from 1667 to 1669. But he soon felt the need to return to New England. As he prepared to depart from Boston for a position in England, he received a call from Northampton Church to stand in for the recently deceased Eleazar Mather, brother of Increase Mather. He accepted the offer, and relocated to Northampton, which in 1670 was on the frontier. Within a few months, Stoddard had married Mather's widow Esther (née Esther, daughter of Rev. John Warham, of Windsor, CT; c. 1644 - February 10, 1736), moved into his house, and took over his pulpit to become Northampton's second minister. He held the post for 55 years, during which time he and Esther produced thirteen children: John, Solomon, Samuel, Solomon, Anthony (d.infant), Anthony, Aaron, Israel, Mary, Christian, Sarah, Esther, Hannah.

Stoddard was pastor of a group ministry of churches at Dorchester, Roxbury, and Springfield as well as Northampton, purchased from the Indians in 1653. Although well versed in the Latin and Hebrew of the Boston Puritan elite, he preferred to use the common language of the frontier in his sermons. A sense of the frontier life may be gleaned from his proposal in 1703 to use dogs "to hunt Indians as they do Bears", the argument being that dogs would catch many an Indian who would be too light of foot for the townsmen. This was not considered inhumane, for the Indians, in Stoddard's view, "act like wolves and are to be dealt with as wolves." Three years later, Massachusetts passed an act for the raising of dogs to better secure the frontier borders.

== Half-way Covenant ==
Stoddard is credited with propounding the Half-way Covenant, at Northampton on 18 April 1661. while young Elezear Mather was the pastor. It represented a reaffirmation of the Communion rules that accompanied a decline of piety in the Congregational church. Stoddard's interest was to insure the growth of church congregations in a colony of second-generation pilgrims who were increasingly interested in the political and economic life of the frontier, as opposed to the pure idealism of their immigrant parents. Stoddard taught that people who had grown up in the church and were not scandalous in behavior could receive communion as a means of grace; and have their children baptized, despite the fact that the Puritan tradition had previously required prospective members of the church to proclaim a spiritual "conversion". Eleazer Mather opposed the Covenant as contrariwise to the Cambridge Platform of 1648, voted against the innovations of Synod of 1662. When in 1669, Mather died, the Northampton Church declared: "to rest contented with that share and portion of privilege belonging to them that are only in a state of Education in Christ's House...and have their children baptized." That was the position when Stoddard took over the congregation. At a meeting on August 1670, Solomon was promised 20 acres of land, but then offered £100 instead. And eventually setting on four acres to build a house, to be funded by a Ministers Rate of 2s 6d. Stoddard was ordained as pastor of Northampton on the strength of a Letter of Recommendation (Feb 7, 1672) from Rev John Strong, regional convenor of the Congregational Church in neighbouring towns of Massachusetts and Connecticut. Subscribing to the Doctrine of Faith, the Half-Way Covenant was put in place was an essential prerequisite to installment. Mather's orthodox Puritanism had witnessed declining numbers, yet Stoddard was able to revitalise the church through liberal reforms.

The Northampton Church was in danger of extinction unless additional members were admitted on a "half-way" basis, explains Harry Swanhart. (Note: the extent to which numbers of numbers of Communicants grew or shrank from about 36 per annum is confused by a lack of records from 1677 until 1734 during the pastorate of Jonathan Edwards, when more complete recording returned.) Stoddard's decision to admit all but the "scandalous" to the church attracted the ire and rancour of the Mathers from the Massachusetts Bay area. For his case, Stoddard turned to the Northampton Town Meeting, abandoning the old Theocracy, but making the "communion of saints" subject to civilian political control. In September 1675, he implored Increase Mather to speak with the Governor to "care for a Reformation...especially mention oppression, that Intollerable Pride in Cloathes and hair, the tolleration of so many taverns, especially in Boston," he wrote from Northampton. Mather eventually came to realise that children were being left without discipline, and so it was axiomatic to support the Synod "to bring them under the yoke of Christ," even if it proved an impossibility.

== Congregationalism and Stoddard ==
Stoddard's Congregationalism would "Whole-way ruin all in a little time", admonished Mather in "The Danger of Apostacy". In theology, Stoddard contradicted nearly every standard belief of his Puritan colleagues. Puritan theology at the time stressed a strict doctrine of salvation by repentance. Stoddard believed that everyone should experience God's glory for himself, whether through Nature or Scripture. When one sees this glory for himself, Stoddard preached that one's will is automatically affected. He explained that "the gloriousness of God has a commanding power on the heart". Membership without conversion should come experientially rather than through any set process or education. Mather countered this belief by stating that, although a Harvard education may assist in the pulpit on Sunday mornings, the sermon is useless unless the minister has experienced God's saving grace.

Stoddard's concepts of theology were not widely accepted either by fellow clergy or laymen in New England. As he believed the ministry was key to bringing people closer to the Lord God Almighty, his main goal was conversion of the hearts of sinners. The only source of salvation was God's Word, especially as related through the sermon. If a community continued to remain unconverted, then either the preacher himself was unconverted, or he needed to modify his sermons to better address the unconverted. This called for a revision in church policy.

"We fear the dangers ahead", averred Edward Taylor of Westfield, whose group, jealous of the improving church-going numbers in Northampton recommended a plan for the adoption of a "Church State." Stoddard called presbyterian like councils to discuss and debate innovations in policy: he wanted to develop the "Instituted Church" in order to preserve purity among ministers. Each church would be instructed through a national church, which determined the proper qualifications for ministers. The redemption of the sinner's soul was to be the evangelical purpose of this church. His ideas, at least in this respect, gained few adherents. Stoddard's position was expressed through debates with his in-laws Cotton and Increase Mather. As leader of one of Boston's primary churches, Cotton Mather wielded influence during Stoddard's lifetime. Mather's arguments could not hold sway: Congregationalism eventually adopted Stoddard's stance on communion, despite initial fears of "New England's apostasy."

Mather remained a formidable opponent. Another contrast between Stoddard and the other Puritan leaders of his time was his belief in the strict dichotomy between the converted (or regenerate) and the unconverted. Stoddard rejected the Puritan claim that no one could discern whether he was saved. Like his own conversion experience, he believed that a person would know when he had been converted, because predestination elected whom God saved and those who were unregenerate. This belief led to the communion controversy: Because of his conversion experience, Solomon stressed the importance of an open communion which would be used as a converting ordinance. In 1677 all members of the community who were instructed in Christian doctrine, made a public profession of faith; and living decent lives, could participate in communion. Stoddard explained that there was no biblical justification for allowing only sinners to take communion.

== Businessman and administrator ==
During King Philip's War Stoddard, already a man of stature in his community, played an outstanding part in organizing defence against the Indian raids that fell on the townspeople "like wolves and are to be dealt withall as wolves". Later at the ambush of Dewey's Hole, Stoddard was almost killed by Indians. The effect was that he began his pastorate feeling all hostiles should be hunted down and killed. But by 1723 he had undergone a complete transformation, becoming the Indians greatest defender, advocating their conversion to Christianity. In the civil world he maintained a good personal friendship with Judge Samuel Sewall, one of Boston's eminent men. He informed the Governor Gurdon Saltonstall of "this Excellent Divine, respecting the Indians." "I congratulate", Sewall told his friend, "the unparalleled constancy of Serviceableness, which God has honoured you ..."

In 1701 his step-daughter Eunice Mather was carried off and never seen again. This event had a profound impact upon such a religious man. He wrote copiously to Increase Mather and the Governor warning of impending doom "for our preservation...that which the Lord ad delivered." Stoddard was a major contributor to the definitive history of the events: A Briefe History of the War with the Indians in New England. he rose to be assumed the public spokesman of his community to Boston. He proposed road-building to improve trade. In 1700 he managed to transfer the ownership of lands to the Township of Northampton, which was granted by petition in 1701.

== Stoddard's Ecclesiology ==
Raised in an orthodox Reformed context, today Stoddard is remembered mostly for his introduction of the Halfway Covenant in Northampton. By the mid-seventeenth century Puritan New England's first American-born children had come of age, but most children of this second generation were not presenting themselves for full membership in the church. Stoddard introduced the practice of "halfway covenanting" or "owning the covenant" in the Northampton church, which permitted adult children who had not formally joined the church to become "halfway members." Halfway membership made it possible to affiliate more closely with the church without making a public statement of faith and conversion. The objective of the practice was to allow the adult children of the first generation of settlers, who were committed to Christianity but unsure of their own conversions, to bring their own young children for baptism in the church. Puritans typically reserved the sacrament of baptism only for adult converts and the children of full members.

== Later years ==
Stoddard's change in the sacraments produced little increase in the number of communicants. Nevertheless, he was able to propose two motions to the Northampton Church in 1690: first, to abolish the public profession of faith and second, to appoint the Lord's Supper as a converting ordinance. The first passed by a majority and as a result the population of Northampton doubled from 500 to 1000 in twenty years. The second motion was opposed by the elders of the church, the motion was denied, although the younger people supported it. In 1725, his congregation decided to bring in an assistant, choosing his grandson Jonathan Edwards. Stoddard had a major influence on his grandson and was succeeded by him as the pastor of the church at Northampton. Edwards later repudiated his views, becoming the most famous and stirring orator of the Great Awakening of 1735-1745. The Great Awakening was to some extent a reaction to the failure of The Halfway Covenant to strengthen the church. But Stoddard's influence persisted in Northampton. Edwards' views eventually displeased his parishioners, and he was dismissed from the pulpit.

Stoddard may have been too liberal for his grandson Jonathan Edwards, but he was lampooned for prudishness concerning petticoats in an anonymous pamphlet attributed to Benjamin Franklin. Stoddard published a pamphlet in 1722 entitled "Answer to Some Cases of Conscience" in which he argued that the newly fashionable hoop petticoats were "Contrary to the Light of Nature" and that "Hooped Petticoats have something of Nakedness". Franklin's satirical response was entitled "Hoop-Petticoats Arraigned and Condemned, by the Light of Nature, and Law of God".

Ultimately, Stoddard's power seems to derive more from his personality, political influence, and preaching ability, than from the force of his ideas. One man describes Stoddard with a poem:

His Venerable Looks let us descry
He taller was than Mean or common size,
Of lovely Look, with majesty in's Eyes.
From Nature's Gate he walk'd like King's on Earth
There's scarce such Presence seen 'mongst human breath

== Works ==
- The Safety of Appearing at the day of Judgment: In the righteousness of Christ, Opened and Applied (1687)
- The Tryal of Assurance, set forth in a Sermon; Preached at Boston upon a Lecture Day, July 7, 1698 (Boston, 1698)
- The Doctrine of the Instituted Churches (Boston, 1700)
- The Way for a People to Live long inn the Land that God hath given them...(Boston: Benjamin Eliot, 1703)
- The Sufficiency of One Good Sign, to prove a man to be in a State of Life; cleared up and applied in a sermon preached at Boston, May 30, 1703 (Boston: Benjamin Eliot, 1703)
- The Inexcusableness of Neglecting the Worship of the Lords Supper (Boston, 1708)
- An Appeal to the Learned. Being a Vindication of the right of Visible Saints to the Lords Supper, though they be destitute of a saving work of God's spirit on their hearts: against the exceptions of Mr Increase Mather. (Boston, 1709)
- Those Taught by God the Father, to know God the Son, are Blessed. A sermon preached at the Boston lecture, July 3, 1712. (Boston: Benjamin Eliot, 1712)
- Four Sermons Lately Preach'd at Boston:

- Shewing the Vertue of Christ's Blood to cleanse from sin. - That Natural Men are under the Government of Self-Love. - That the Gospel is the Means of Conversion. - To Stir up Young Men and Maidens to Praise the Name of the Lord. (Boston: Daniel Henchman, 1717.)

- The Presence of Christ with the Ministers of the Gospel, Swampsfield, Jan 1st, 1717–18, at the ordination of Joseph Willard. (Boston: Benjamin Green, 1718).
- A Treatise Concerning the Nature of Saving Conversion, and the way wherein it is wrought... A Lecture-Srmon at Boston, July 2, 1719. (Boston: Daniel henchman, 1719)
- A Guide to Christ: or, The Way of Directing Souls that are Under the Work of Conversion
- The Doctrine of Instituted Churches: Explained and Proved from the Word of God
- An Answer to Some Cases of Conscience Respecting the Country (1722)
- Question Whether God is not Angry with the Indians for doing so little towards the Conversion of the Indians? (Boston, 1723)
- A guide to Christ, Or, The Way of directing Souls that are under the Work of Conversion, compiled for the help of Young Ministers...Preface by Increase Mather (Boston: J. Draper, 1735)

== Sources ==
- David Paul McDowell, Beyond the Half-Way Covenant: Solomon Stoddard's Understanding of The Lord's Supper as a Converting Ordinance (Wipf and Stock, 2012)
- Lee, Sang hyun (2005). The Princeton Companion to Jonathan Edwards. Princeton University Press. ISBN 978-0-6911-2108-6.
- Miller, Perry (October 1941). "Solomon Stoddard, 1643-1729". The Harvard Theological Review. 34 (4). Cambridge University Press: 277–340. doi:10.1017/S0017816000022495. JSTOR 1507992.
- Swanhart, Harry Gerald (1929). Solomon Stoddard: puritan patriarch, a biography. Boston: Boston University Press.
- Aaron Flake Christensen, Pope or Persuader: The Influence of Solomon Stoddard in Northampton and Western Massachusetts (Oklahoma State University, 2005) unpublished PhD.
- McClintock, John; Strong, James (eds.). "Stoddard, Solomon". McClintock and Strong Biblical cyclopedia.
