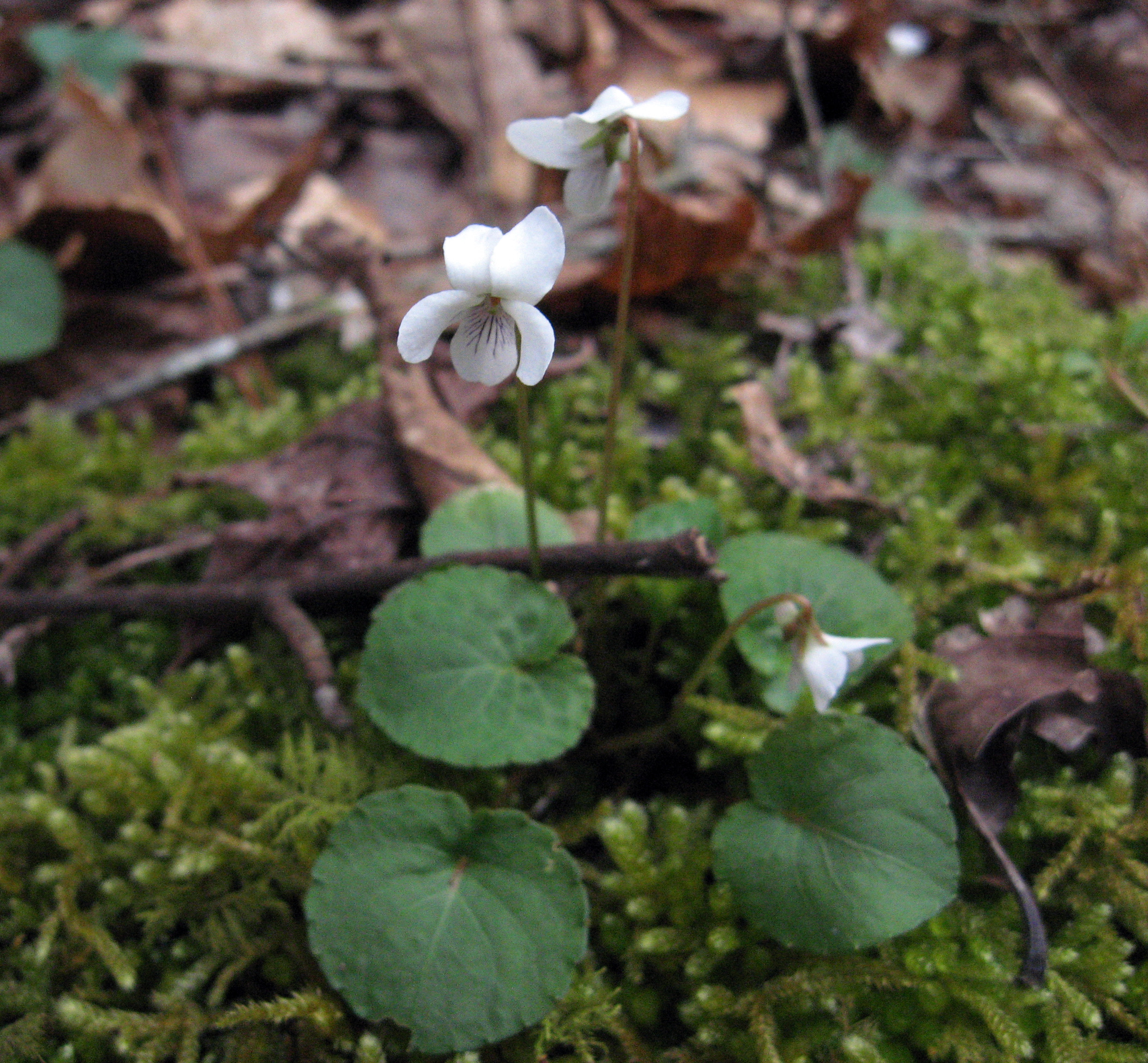

Conservation status
- Secure (NatureServe)

Scientific classification
- Kingdom: Plantae
- Clade: Tracheophytes
- Clade: Angiosperms
- Clade: Eudicots
- Clade: Rosids
- Order: Malpighiales
- Family: Violaceae
- Genus: Viola
- Species: V. blanda

Binomial name
- Viola blanda Willd.

Synonyms
- Viola incognita Brainerd

= Viola blanda =

Species of flowering plant

Viola blanda, commonly called the sweet white violet, is a flowering perennial plant in the Violet family (Violaceae). It is native to parts of south-eastern and south-central Canada and the eastern, and north-central, United States. Its natural habitat is in cool, mesic forests.

== Description ==
The sweet white violet grows 6 to 12 inches tall and produces small white flowers in spring and early summer. The lower petals feature purple veins, while the upper petals are often twisted or bent backward. The stalks have a reddish tint, and the heart-shaped leaves, 1–2 inches long, bear a few scattered hairs.

The white violet has demonstrated a weak ability to respond to climate change by shifting its flowering time in some areas of its range.
