= Moses Allen (minister) =

Moses Allen (September 14, 1748 – February 8, 1779) was a minister of Midway, Georgia, during the American Revolution.

He was born in Northampton, Massachusetts, and educated at the College of New Jersey. He preached at Christ Church Parish in Charleston, South Carolina, and then moved to Savannah. There, he was ordained by Rev. John J. Zubly and William Tennent III, grandson of William Tennent. He served in Rev. Zubly's place in Savannah while he was attending the Continental Congress in Philadelphia. He then replaced the Rev. John Osgood at Midway Congregational Church. Midway and the surrounding St. John's Parish was hotbed of republican sentiment during the outbreak of the American Revolution.

In 1778, General Augustine Prevost, military commander of British East Florida—headquartered in St. Augustine—dispersed his society, and burned the meeting house and many dwelling houses, etc. When Savannah was taken, Allen was also taken prisoner, and sent on board the prison ships. He was very active both in exhortation and in actual service in the field. He was drowned in an attempt to escape.
