= Northampton, Massachusetts =

City in Massachusetts, United States

- City
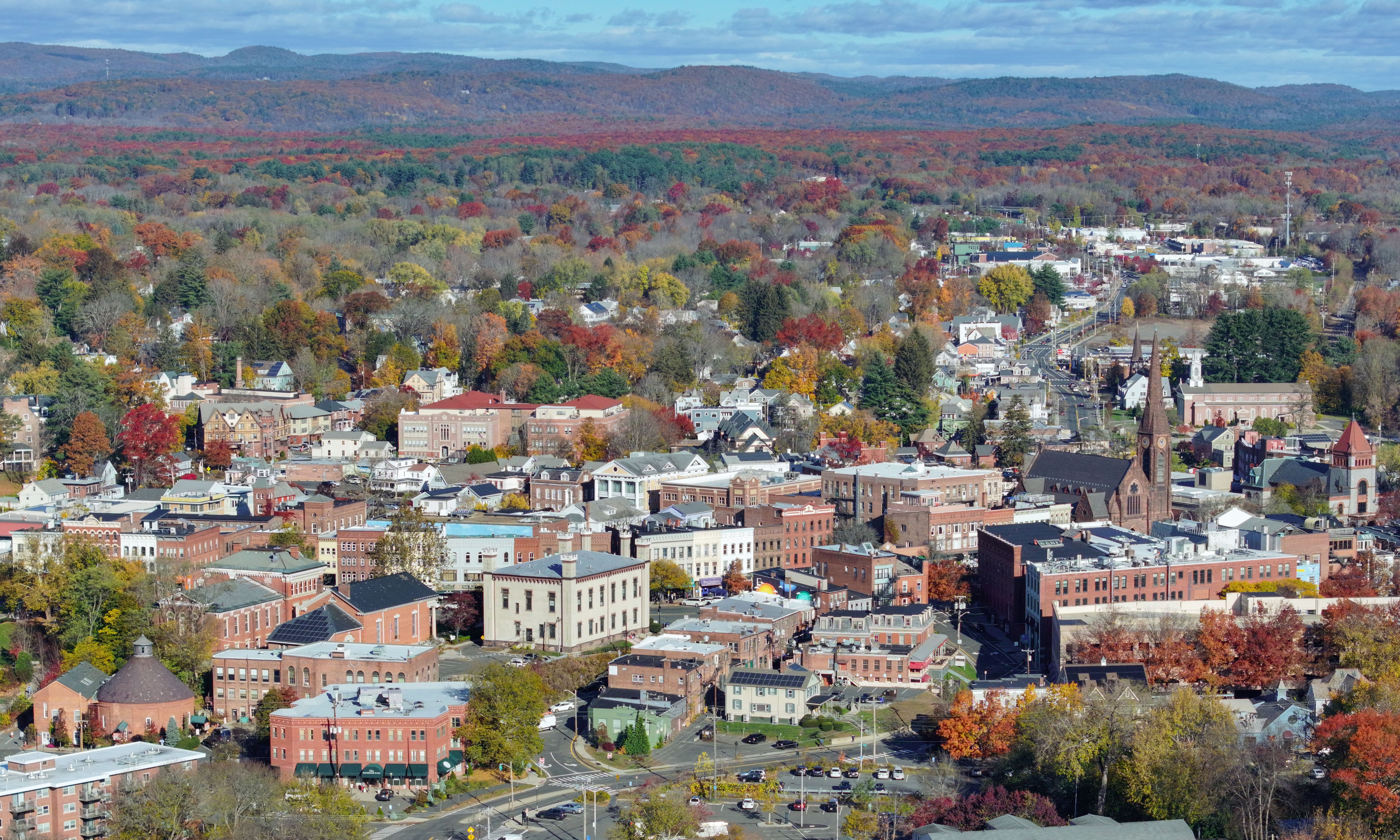
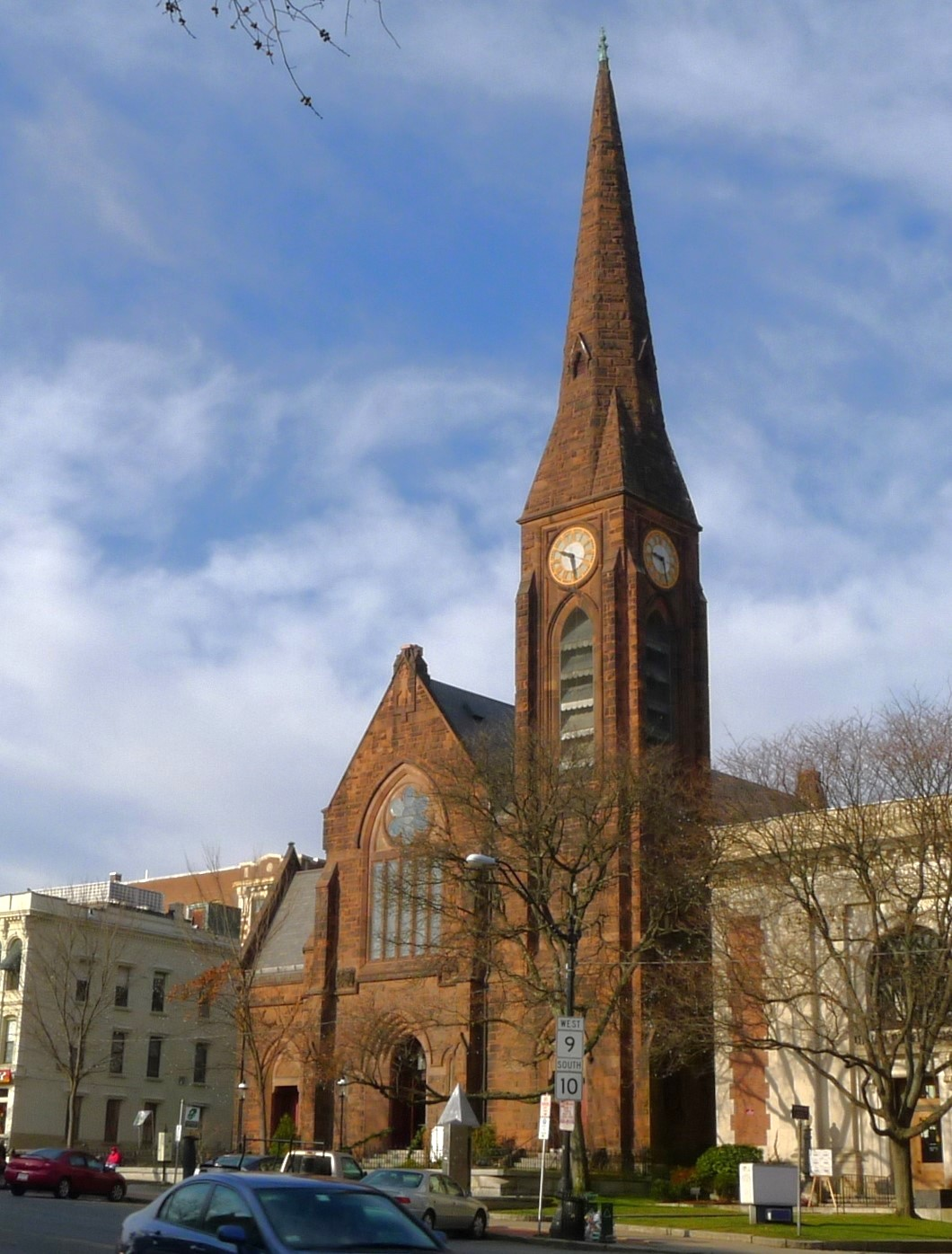
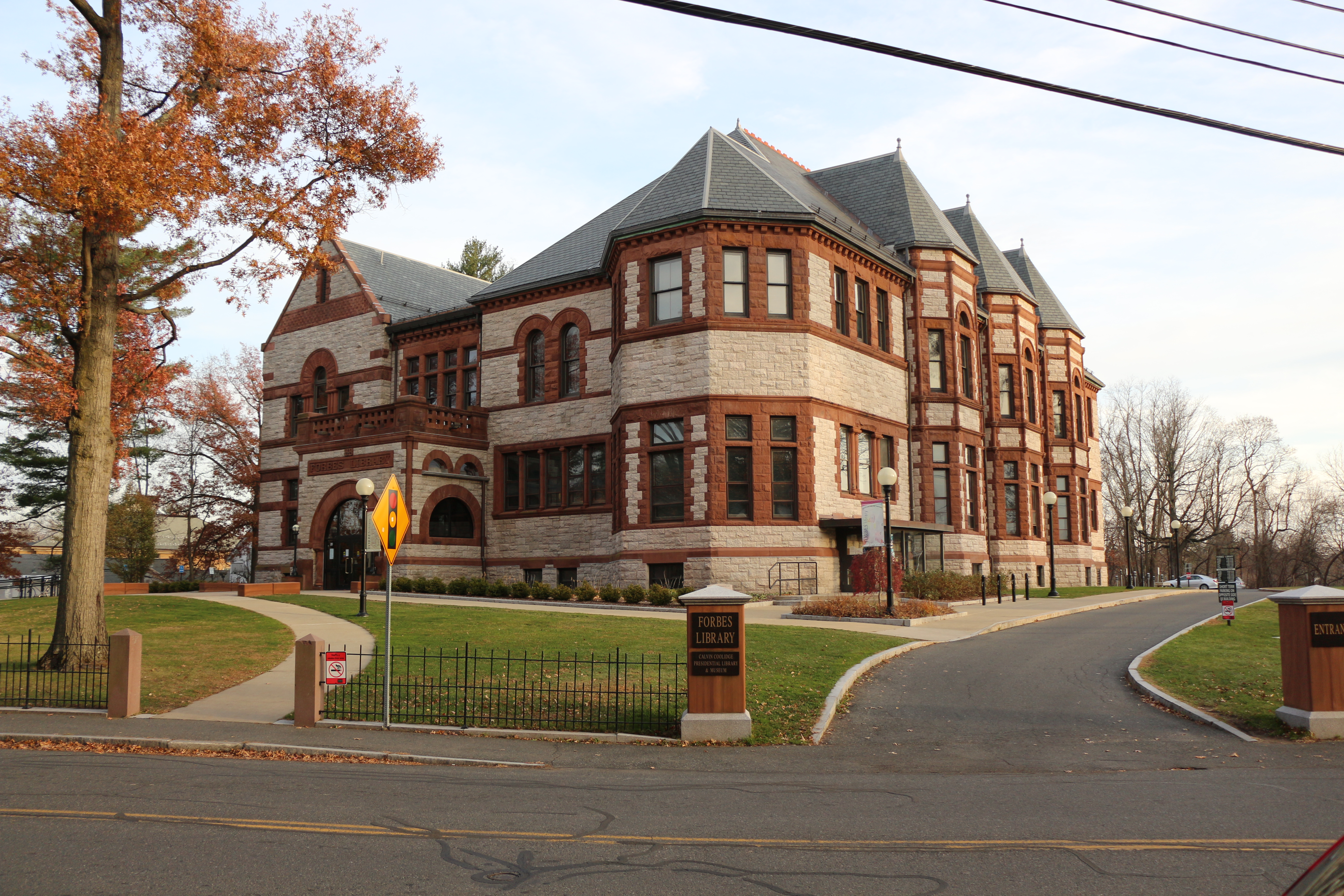
- Downtown First Church of Christ Forbes Library

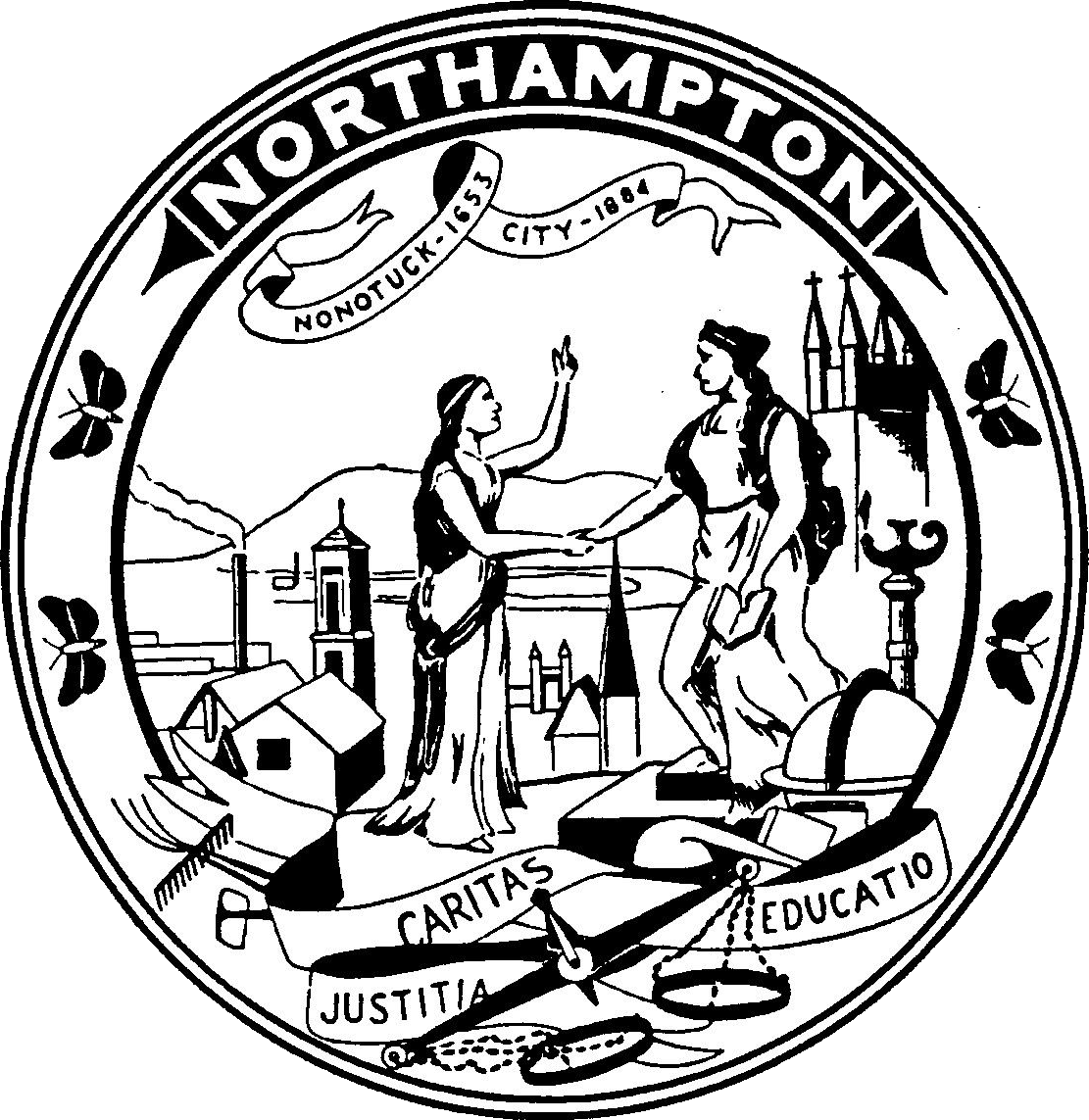
- Flag Seal
- Nickname: The Meadow City
- Motto: Caritas, educatio, justitia (Latin) "Caring, education and justice"
- Location of Northampton in Hampshire County, Massachusetts

- Location in the United States
- Coordinates: 42°19′5″N 72°37′55″W
- Country: United States
- State: Massachusetts
- County: Hampshire
- Charter for township granted: May 18, 1653
- European settlers arrive: Early spring, 1654
- Established as a city: September 5, 1883

Government
  - Type: Mayor-council
  - Mayor: Gina-Louise Sciarra (D)

Area
  - Total: 35.75 sq mi (92.59 km^{2})
  - Land: 34.25 sq mi (88.70 km^{2})
  - Water: 1.51 sq mi (3.90 km^{2})
- Elevation: 190 ft (58 m)

Population (2020)
  - Total: 29,571
  - Density: 864/sq mi (333.4/km^{2})
- Time zone: UTC−5 (Eastern)
  - Summer (DST): UTC−4 (Eastern)
- ZIP Codes: 01060–01063 (Northampton); 01053 (Leeds)
- Area code: 413
- FIPS code: 25-46330
- Website: northamptonma.gov

Northampton /nɔːrθˈhæmptən/ is a city in and the county seat of Hampshire County, Massachusetts, United States. As of the 2020 census, the population of Northampton (including its outer villages, Florence and Leeds) was 29,571.

Northampton is known as an academic, artistic, musical, and countercultural hub. It features a large politically liberal community along with numerous alternative health and intellectual organizations. Based on U.S. Census demographics, election returns, and other criteria, the website Epodunk rates Northampton as the most politically liberal medium-size city (population 25,000–99,000) in the United States. The city has a high proportion of residents who identify as gay and lesbian and a high number of same-sex households and is a popular destination for the LGBT community.

Northampton is part of the Pioneer Valley and is one of the northernmost cities in the Knowledge Corridor—a cross-state cultural and economic partnership with other Connecticut River Valley cities and towns. Northampton is part of the Springfield Metropolitan Area, one of western Massachusetts's two separate metropolitan areas. It sits approximately 19 miles (31 km) north of the city of Springfield.

Northampton is home to Smith College, the Hotel Northampton, Northampton High School, Smith Vocational and Agricultural High School, and the Clarke Schools for Hearing and Speech.

== History ==
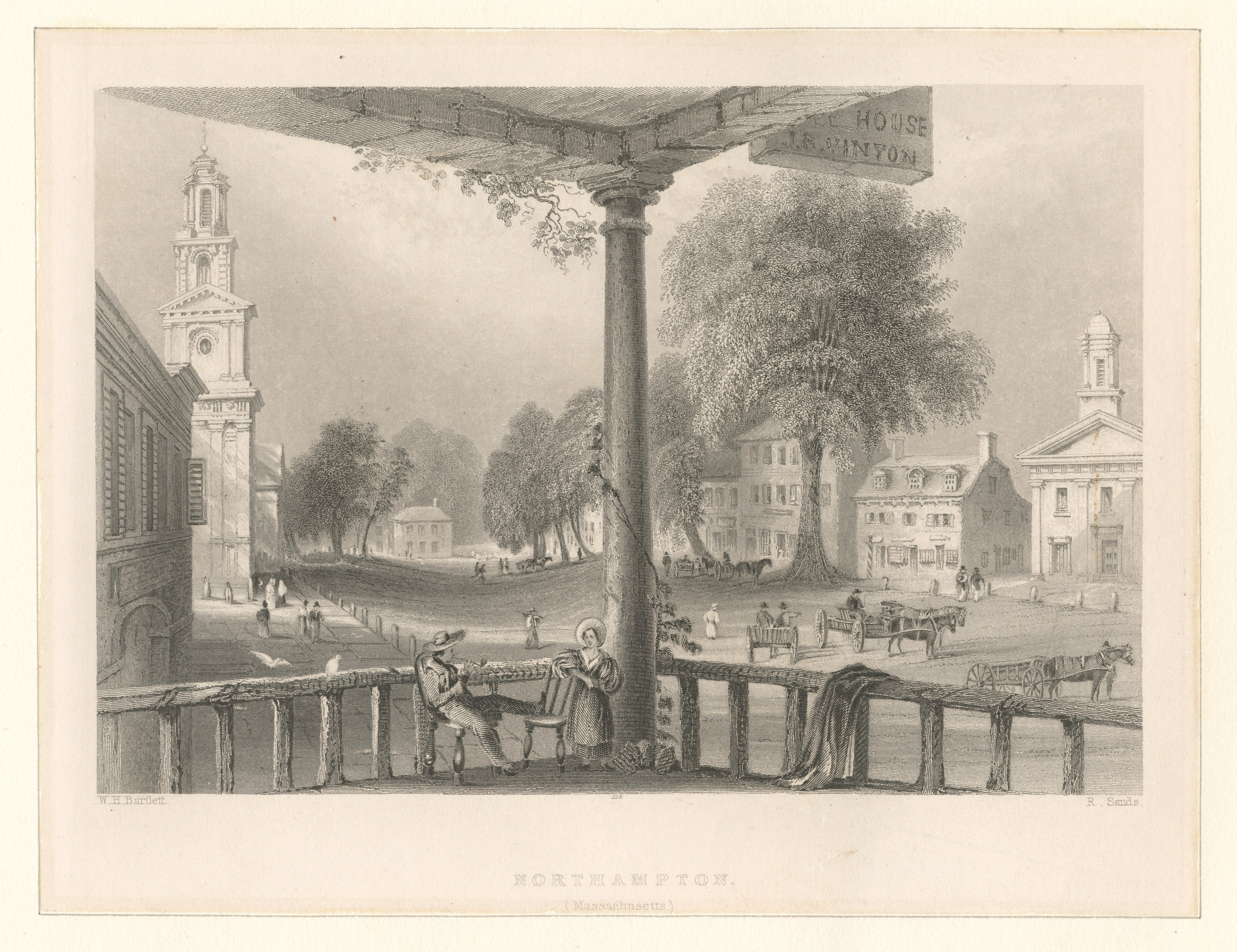
Northampton (Massachusetts), New York Public Library

=== Early settlement ===
Northampton was known as "Norwottuck", or "Nonotuck", meaning "the midst of the river", named by its original Pocumtuc inhabitants. According to various accounts, Northampton was given its present name by John A. King (1629–1703), one of the first white settlers in Northampton, or possibly in King's honor, since it is supposed that he came to Massachusetts from Northampton, England, his birthplace.

The Pocumtuc confederacy occupied the Connecticut River Valley from what is now southern Vermont and New Hampshire into northern Connecticut. The Pocumtuc tribes were Algonquian and traditionally allied with the Mahican confederacy to the west. By 1606 an ongoing struggle between the Mahican and Iroquois confederacies led to direct attacks on the Pocumtuc by the Iroquoian Mohawk nation. The Mahican confederacy had been defeated by 1628, limiting Pocumtuc access to trade routes to the west. The area suffered a major smallpox epidemic in the 1630s following the arrival of Dutch traders in the Hudson Valley and New England settlers in the Massachusetts Bay Colony during the previous two decades. It was in this context that the land making up the bulk of modern Northampton was sold to settlers from Springfield in 1653.

On May 18, 1653, a petition for township was approved by the general court of Springfield. While some settlers visited the land in the fall of 1653, they waited till early spring 1654 to arrive and establish a permanent settlement. The situation in the region further deteriorated when the Mohawk people escalated hostilities against the Pocumtuc confederacy and other Algonquian tribes after 1655, forcing many of the plague-devastated Algonquian groups into defensive mergers. This coincided with a souring of relations between the Wampanoag and the Massachusetts Bay colonists, eventually leading to the expanded Algonquian alliance, which took part in King Philip's War.

=== Partition ===
Northampton was part of the Equivalent Lands compromise. Its territory was enlarged beyond the original settlement, but later portions would be carved up into separate cities, towns, and municipalities. Southampton, for example, was incorporated in 1775 and included parts of the territories of modern Montgomery (incorporated in 1780) and Easthampton. Westhampton was incorporated in 1778 and Easthampton in 1809. A hamlet of Northampton, called Smith's Ferry, became separated from the rest of the city with the drawing of boundaries for Easthampton. Because the village was separated by Mount Tom, the shortest path to and from the downtown to this area was a road near the Connecticut River oxbow, which was frequently subject to flooding. This led to many services such as fire and police being provided by the city of Holyoke rather than Northampton's own municipal departments, and after a number of negotiations between the two cities, Smith's Ferry was ceded to Holyoke in 1909 for a sum of $62,000.

=== The Great Awakening ===
Congregational preacher, theologian and philosopher Jonathan Edwards was a leading figure in a 1734 Christian revival in Northampton. In the winter of 1734 and the following spring it reached such intensity that it threatened the town's businesses. In the spring of 1735 the movement began to subside and a reaction set in. But the relapse was brief, and the Northampton revival, which had spread through the Connecticut River Valley and whose fame had reached England and Scotland, was followed in 1739–1740 by the Great Awakening, under the leadership of Edwards.

For this achievement, Edwards is considered one of the founders of evangelical Christianity.

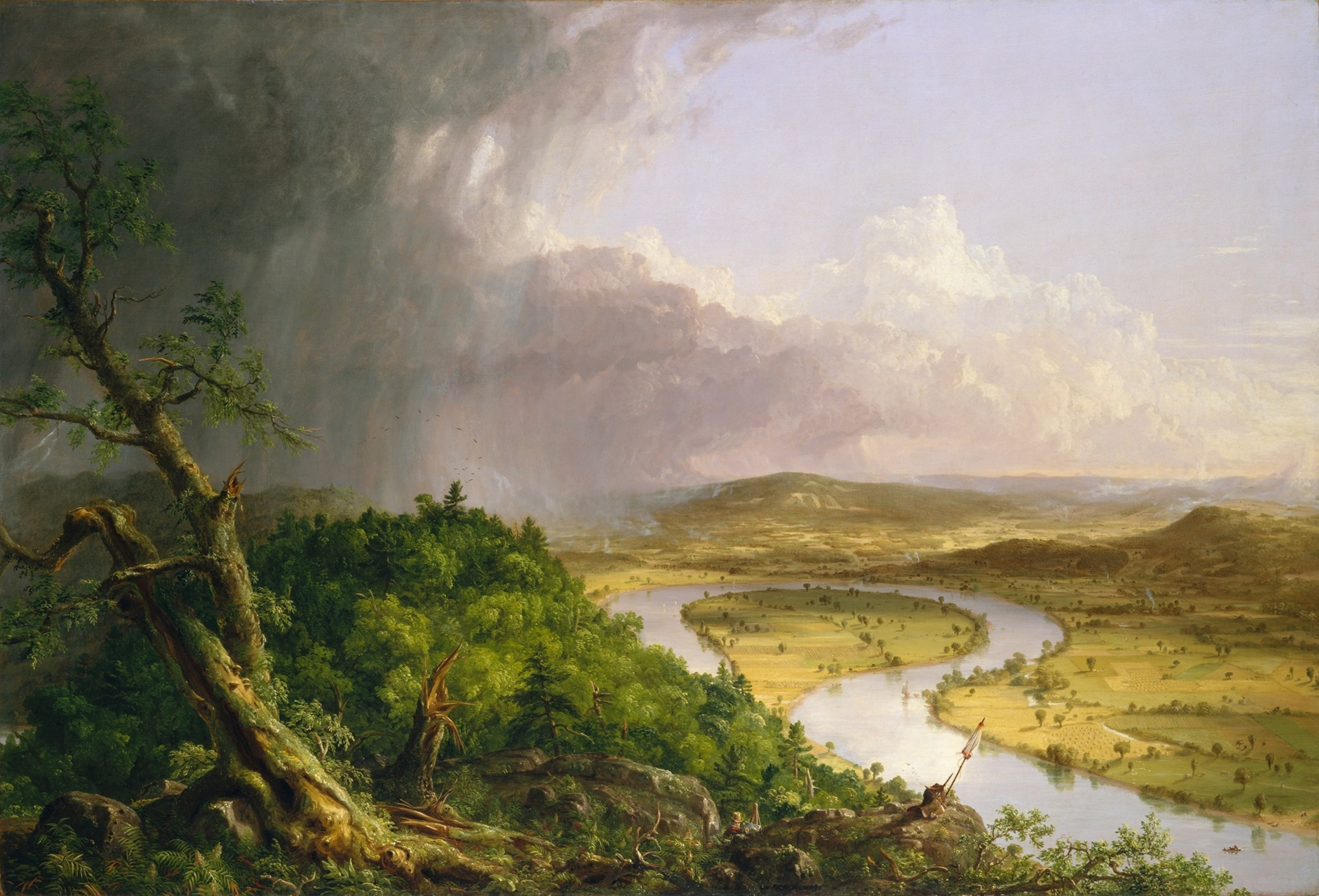
The Oxbow (1836) by Thomas Cole

Northampton hosted its own witch trials in the 1700s, although no alleged witches were executed.

=== After the Revolution ===
Members of the Northampton community were present at the Constitutional Convention in Philadelphia.

On August 29, 1786, Daniel Shays and a group of Revolutionary War veterans (who called themselves Shaysites) stopped the civil court from sitting in Northampton, in an uprising known as Shays' Rebellion.

In 1805 a crowd of 15,000 gathered in Northampton to watch the executions of two Irishmen convicted of murder: Dominic Daley, 34, and James Halligan, 27. The crowd, composed largely of New England White Anglo-Saxon Protestants, lit bonfires and expressed virulently anti-Irish and anti-Catholic sentiments. The trial evidence against Daley and Halligan was sparse, circumstantial, contrived, and perjurious. The men were hanged on June 5, 1806, on Pancake Plain. Their bodies were denied a burial; they were destroyed in the local slaughterhouse. This trial "later came to be seen as epitomizing the anti-Irish sentiment that was widespread in New England in the early 19th century." Daley and Halligan were exonerated of all crimes by governor Michael Dukakis in 1984. Today a simple stone landmark stands marking the site of Daley and Halligan's executions.

In 1835 Northampton was linked to the ocean by the New Haven and Northampton Canal, but the canal enterprise foundered and after about a decade was replaced by a railroad running along the same route. A flood on the Mill River on May 16, 1874, obliterated almost the entire Northampton neighborhood of Leeds, killing 139 people in Leeds and areas of neighboring towns.

=== The "Paradise of America" ===
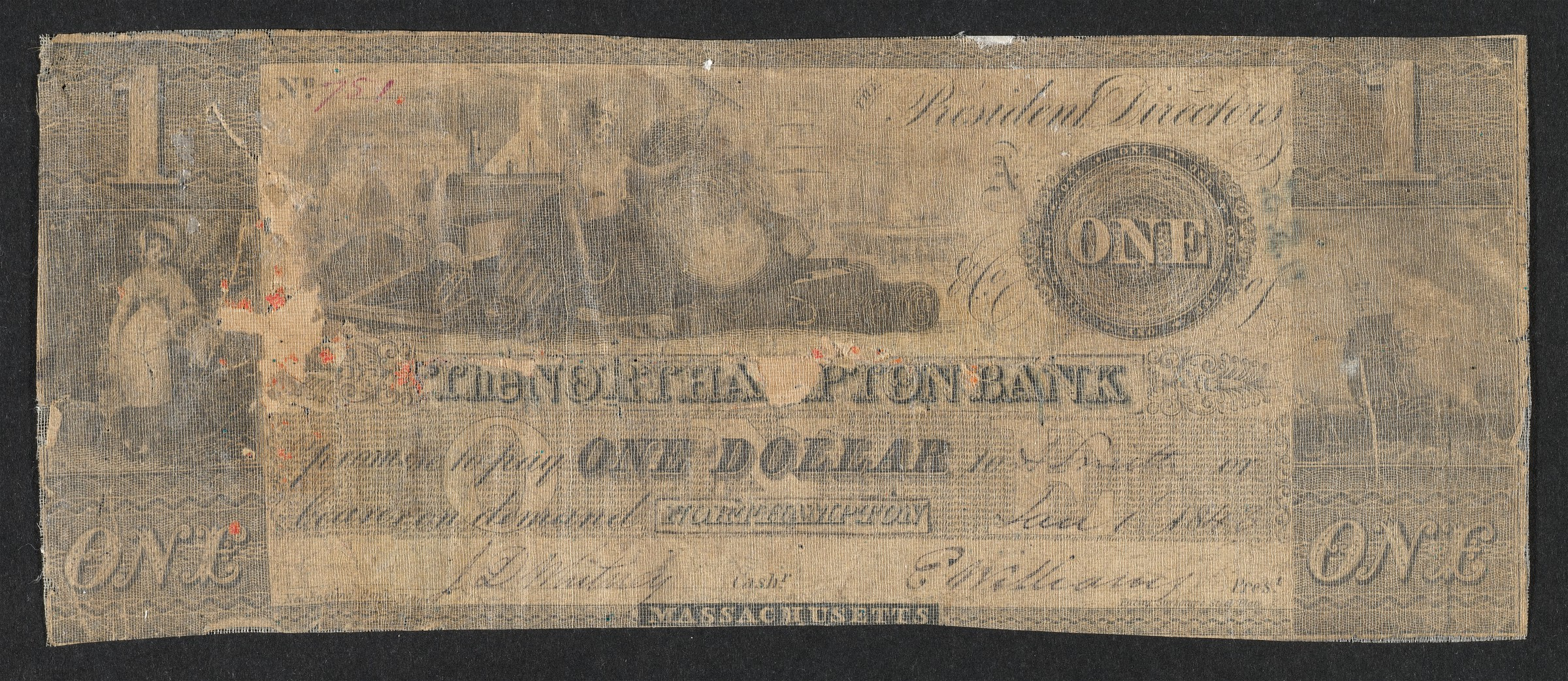
Northampton Bank one dollar note from 1843.

From 1842 until 1846, Northampton was home to a transcendentalist utopian community of abolitionists. Called the Northampton Association of Education and Industry, the community believed that the rights of all people should be "equal without distinction of sex, color or condition, sect or religion". It supported itself by producing mulberry trees and silk. Sojourner Truth, a former slave who became a national advocate for equality and justice, lived in this community until its dissolution (and later in a house on Park Street until 1857).

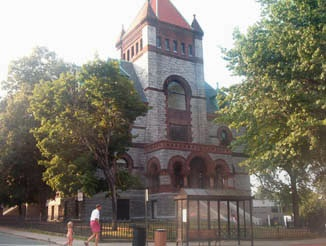
Hampshire County Courthouse in Northampton, designed by architect Henry Franklin Kilburn.

In 1851, opera singer Jenny Lind, the "Swedish Nightingale", declared Northampton to be the "Paradise of America", from which Northampton took its nickname "The Paradise City".

Clarke Schools for Hearing and Speech (formerly the Clarke School for the Deaf) was founded in Northampton in 1867. It was the United States' first permanent oral school for the deaf. Alexander Graham Bell and Grace Coolidge have served as heads of school.

Smith College for women was founded in Northampton in 1871. Today Smith is the largest of the Seven Sisters colleges. Well-known Smith alumnae include Sylvia Plath, Barbara Bush, Nancy Reagan, Tammy Baldwin, Gloria Steinem, Madeleine L'Engle, and Julia Child. The first game of women's basketball was played at Smith College in 1892.

A theft of $1.6 million ($46.5 million in 2023) from the Northampton Bank took place on January 27, 1876.

Northampton officially became a city on September 5, 1883, when voters accepted the city charter, "The act to establish the city of Northampton. 1883-Chapter 250," as passed and approved.

Immigrant groups that settled Northampton in large numbers included Irish, Polish, and French-Canadians. In 1890, a small number of German-Jewish families arrived in Northampton, most of them coming from New York or Boston. By 1905 there were almost 5000 foreign-born residents among the 20,000 people of the city.

=== Decline ===
During the mid-20th century, Northampton experienced several decades of economic decline, bottoming in the 1970s, related to the emergence of the Rust Belt phenomenon. Though western Massachusetts lies outside of the Rust Belt geographically, the centrality of commerce and the arts to Northampton's economy left it economically vulnerable, in particular when compounded with the decline of Springfield's manufacturing sector, Holyoke's paper industry, and massive plant closures in the New York Capital District.

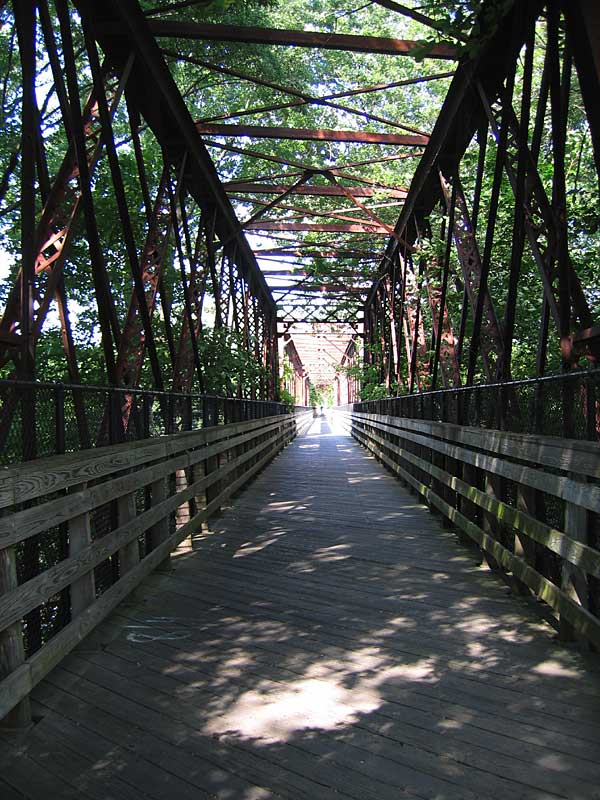
The Norwottuck Rail Trail Bridge across the Connecticut River

=== Cultural renaissance ===
Beginning in the final decades of the twentieth century, Northampton saw a resurgence as a thriving cultural center and a popular tourist destination. The city has many eclectic restaurants and a lively arts and music scene. Four Northampton farmers markets, held weekly, sell fresh produce from local farms.

Since 1982, Northampton has been host to an annual LGBT Parade and Pride event held the first Saturday in May.

Since 1995 Northampton has been home to the twice-yearly Paradise City Arts Festival, held at the Three County Fairgrounds on Memorial Day weekend and Columbus Day weekend. The festival is a national juried showcase for contemporary craft and fine art.

Since 2004, Northampton has been the site of Django in June, a week-long gypsy jazz music camp held annually on the campus of Smith College.

In recent years, downtown Northampton has seen a decline, with nearly one out of five storefronts being vacant as of September 2022.

== Geography ==
Northampton sits on the west side of the Connecticut River in the Pioneer Valley of western Massachusetts. It is located at 42°20′N 72°39′W.

According to the United States Census Bureau, the city has a total area of 35.8 square miles (92.6 km^{2}), of which 34.2 square miles (88.7 km^{2}) are land and 1.5 square miles (3.9 km^{2}), or 4.22%, are water. A total of 21% of the city is permanently protected open space.

Within Northampton's city limits are the villages of Florence and Leeds.

Northampton is bordered to the north by the towns of Hatfield and Williamsburg, to the west by Westhampton, to the east by Hadley (across the Connecticut River), and to the south by Easthampton.

The art deco Calvin Coolidge Bridge connects Northampton with Hadley across the Connecticut River. The college town of Amherst is located 7 miles (11 km) east of Northampton, next to Hadley. Springfield, the Connecticut River Valley's most populous Massachusetts city, is located 19 miles (31 km) southeast of Northampton. Boston is 104 miles (167 km) by highway east of Northampton. New York City is 161 miles (259 km) southwest of Northampton.

The Connecticut River's Oxbow is within Northampton's city limits, at the northern base of Mount Nonotuck.

== Climate ==
Northampton has a humid continental climate (Köppen Dfb), typical of western Massachusetts. Winters are cold and snowy (as low as to −11 °C (12 °F)), and summers are warm and humid (as much as 28 °C (82 °F)). Precipitation is evenly distributed year-around, with an annual average of 46.14 in (1,172 mm).

Climate data for Northampton, Massachusetts (01060)
Month	Jan	Feb	Mar	Apr	May	Jun	Jul	Aug	Sep	Oct	Nov	Dec	Year
Record high °F (°C)	70 (21)	70 (21)	85 (29)	93 (34)	98 (37)	98 (37)	100 (38)	100 (38)	99 (37)	89 (32)	82 (28)	72 (22)	100 (38)
Mean daily maximum °F (°C)	33 (1)	37 (3)	45 (7)	58 (14)	69 (21)	78 (26)	82 (28)	81 (27)	73 (23)	62 (17)	49 (9)	38 (3)	59 (15)
Mean daily minimum °F (°C)	13 (−11)	16 (−9)	24 (−4)	35 (2)	45 (7)	55 (13)	59 (15)	58 (14)	49 (9)	38 (3)	30 (−1)	20 (−7)	37 (3)
Record low °F (°C)	−30 (−34)	−27 (−33)	−17 (−27)	11 (−12)	24 (−4)	32 (0)	40 (4)	32 (0)	25 (−4)	12 (−11)	−4 (−20)	−20 (−29)	−30 (−34)
Average precipitation inches (mm)	3.34 (85)	3.23 (82)	3.57 (91)	3.87 (98)	4.14 (105)	4.10 (104)	4.03 (102)	3.76 (96)	4.19 (106)	4.64 (118)	3.83 (97)	3.44 (87)	46.14 (1,171)
Source: Weather.com

== Demographics ==
Historical population
Year	Pop.	±%
1790	1,628	—
1800	2,190	+34.5%
1810	2,631	+20.1%
1820	2,854	+8.5%
1830	3,613	+26.6%
1840	3,750	+3.8%
1850	5,278	+40.7%
1860	6,788	+28.6%
1870	10,160	+49.7%
1880	12,172	+19.8%
1890	14,990	+23.2%
1900	18,643	+24.4%
1910	19,431	+4.2%
1920	21,951	+13.0%
1930	24,381	+11.1%
1940	24,794	+1.7%
1950	29,063	+17.2%
1960	30,058	+3.4%
1970	29,664	−1.3%
1980	29,286	−1.3%
1990	29,289	+0.0%
2000	28,978	−1.1%
2010	28,549	−1.5%
2020	29,571	+3.6%
2024*	31,315	+5.9%
* = population estimate. Source: United States census records and Population Estimates Program data. Source: U.S. Decennial Census

=== 2020 census ===
As of the 2020 census, Northampton had a population of 29,571. The median age was 42.8 years. 14.6% of residents were under the age of 18 and 21.7% of residents were 65 years of age or older. For every 100 females there were 73.7 males, and for every 100 females age 18 and over there were 69.0 males age 18 and over.

94.0% of residents lived in urban areas, while 6.0% lived in rural areas.

There were 12,799 households in Northampton, of which 20.6% had children under the age of 18 living in them. Of all households, 36.0% were married-couple households, 21.1% were households with a male householder and no spouse or partner present, and 34.8% were households with a female householder and no spouse or partner present. About 39.4% of all households were made up of individuals and 16.2% had someone living alone who was 65 years of age or older.

There were 13,668 housing units, of which 6.4% were vacant. The homeowner vacancy rate was 1.7% and the rental vacancy rate was 4.1%.

Racial composition as of the 2020 census
Race	Number	Percent
White	23,667	80.0%
Black or African American	915	3.1%
American Indian and Alaska Native	87	0.3%
Asian	1,301	4.4%
Native Hawaiian and Other Pacific Islander	12	0.0%
Some other race	1,100	3.7%
Two or more races	2,489	8.4%
Hispanic or Latino (of any race)	2,697	9.1%

=== 2010 census ===
As of the census of 2010, there were 28,549 people, 12,000 households, and 5,895 families residing in the city. The population density was 833.7 inhabitants per square mile (321.9/km^{2}). There were 12,728 housing units (12,000 occupied) at an average density of 360.0 per square mile (139.0/km^{2}). The racial makeup of the city was 87.7% White, 2.7% African American, 0.3% Native American, 4.1% Asian, 0.1% Pacific Islander, 2.4% from other races, and 2.7% from two or more races. Hispanic or Latino of any race were 6.8% of the population.

There were 12,000 households, out of which 21.5% had children under the age of 18 living with them, 34.6% were characterized as "husband-wife" married couples living together, 11.3% had a female householder with no husband present, and 50.9% were non-families. Of all households 37.2% were made up of individuals, and 10.2% had someone living alone who was 65 years of age or older. The average household size was 2.12 and the average family size was 2.81.

In the city, the population was spread out, with 20.7% age 19 and under, 9.8% from 20 to 24, 25.7% from 25 to 44, 30.2% from 45 to 64, and 13.5% who were 65 years of age or older. The median age was 40 years. For every 100 females, there were 75.8 males. For every 100 females age 18 and over, there were 71.9 males.

=== Income ===
The median income for a household in the city was $56,999, and the median income for a family was $80,179. Males had a median income of $40,470 versus $32,003 for females. The per capita income for the city was $33,440. About 7.8% of families and 13.5% of the population were below the poverty line, including 15.1% of those under age 18 and 7.2% of those age 65 or over.

=== Education ===
Northampton's public schools include four elementary schools (kindergarten through 5th grade), one middle school (6th to 8th grade), one high school (9th to 12th grade), and one vocational-agricultural high school (9th to 12th grade). There are several private schools in Northampton and a number of charter schools in surrounding towns.

=== LGBT demographics ===
Northampton has the most lesbian couples per capita of any city in the US. According to the website ePodunk's Gay Index, which is based on figures from the 2000 US Census, Northampton has a score of 535, vs. a national average score of 100 (i.e., Northampton's population includes 5.35 times the national average of same-sex unmarried households). According to the Human Rights Campaign, Northampton scored a 100 out of 100 on its Municipality Equality Index.

== Government ==
Gina-Louise Sciarra is the mayor of Northampton. Previous mayors have included future President of the United States Calvin Coolidge (1910–1911) and James "Big Jim" Cahillane, who served from 1954 to 1960. Well-known Judge Sean M. Dunphy was the youngest elected mayor in its history, at age 28.

The city also has a nine-member city council, composed of seven ward representatives and two at-large members. Councilors are elected to two-year terms and the council meets twice monthly for 10 months out of the year. The three other elected city-wide bodies are the School Committee, the Trustees of Smith Vocational and Agricultural High School and the Trustees of Forbes Library.

Northampton is represented in the 1st Hampshire District of the Massachusetts House of Representatives by Democrat Lindsay Sabadosa, in the Hampshire, Franklin and Worcester District of the Massachusetts Senate by Democrat Jo Comerford, and on the Eighth Massachusetts Governor's Council District by Democrat Tara Jacobs.

Voter registration and party enrollment as of August 24, 2024
Party	Number of voters	Percentage
Democratic	10,459	45.29%
Republican	596	2.58%
Unaffiliated	11,798	51.09%
Libertarian	54	0.23%
Total	23,090	100%

Presidential election results
Year	Democratic	Republican
2024	84.8% 14,477	10.5% 1,800
2020	87.3% 15,649	10.3% 1,855
2016	81.4% 13,512	11.3% 1,878
2012	82.3% 13,259	13.5% 2,182
2008	82.7% 13,412	14.7% 2,387
2004	79.5% 12,233	18.1% 2,793
2000	61.3% 8,716	18.6% 2,648
1996	71.4% 10,091	16.0% 2,262
1992	64.3% 9,750	18.1% 2,741
1988	69.0% 9,753	29.7% 4,201
1984	63.4% 8,994	36.2% 5,187
1980	50.7% 6,629	31.2% 4,081

== Education ==
=== Colleges and universities ===
Northampton is home to Smith College, founded in 1871, a women's college (one of the Seven Sisters), it is also one of the Five Colleges Consortium. Smith students (along with those of the associated Five Colleges) contribute to Northampton's college town atmosphere.

=== Clarke Schools for Hearing and Speech ===
Clarke Schools for Hearing and Speech (formerly the Clarke School for the Deaf) specializes in oral education (speech and lip-reading, as opposed to signing) and holds an annual summer camp, the theme varying from summer to summer. Clarke is the oldest oral school for the deaf in the country, established in 1867 on Round Hill Road overlooking the Connecticut River Valley.

=== Hill Institute ===
Established in 1876 by Samuel L. Hill, the Hill Institute in Florence is a private educational organization known for founding the first free kindergarten in the United States and currently offering community craft and industrial arts classes for adults and children.

== Media ==
The Daily Hampshire Gazette, a six-day a week morning newspaper and the oldest surviving newspaper in Massachusetts, is based in Northampton, covering Hampshire and Franklin counties.

Northampton is the city of license for three commercial radio stations: WLZX-FM, WEIB, and WHMP. Northampton is also home to WXOJ-LP, a low-power community radio station owned and operated by Valley Free Radio. The station was built by more than 400 volunteers from Northampton and around the country in August 2005 at the eighth Prometheus Radio Project barnraising, in conjunction with the tenth annual Grassroots Radio Coalition conference. Valley Free Radio broadcasts music, news, public affairs, and locally produced radio content to listeners at 103.3 FM. Northampton also holds Smith College’s student-run radio station WOZQ, which aired its first broadcast in 1982.

In addition, Northampton is home to Northampton Open Media (NOM), formally Northampton Community Television, which has existed in numerous forms since the mid-1980s but experienced a radical change in 2006 when it became an independently run nonprofit community media center. After a new public unveiling in November 2007, NOM grew to over 200 active members in less than 18 months and had already attracted statewide and national attention in the community media landscape. In 2012, 2013 and 2014 NOM won awards for best web sites (for two different sites) in the United States for community media organizations with budgets under $300,000.

== Transportation ==
=== Roads ===
Northampton is served by four exits of Interstate 91, which passes to the east of downtown along the Connecticut River. U.S. Route 5, Massachusetts Route 9, and Massachusetts Route 10 all intersect in the city's downtown area. Massachusetts Route 66 also is partially in Northampton.

The city of Northampton faces daily traffic congestion in the downtown area and connector roads, often resulting in long delays and traffic buildup. The limitation of one bridge across the Connecticut River (the only route to the nearby college town of Amherst) and a busy main street results in unsafe driving behavior and danger to pedestrians. The City of Northampton is attempting to solve this long-time problem by redesigning problematic intersections and installing traffic cameras.

=== Rail ===
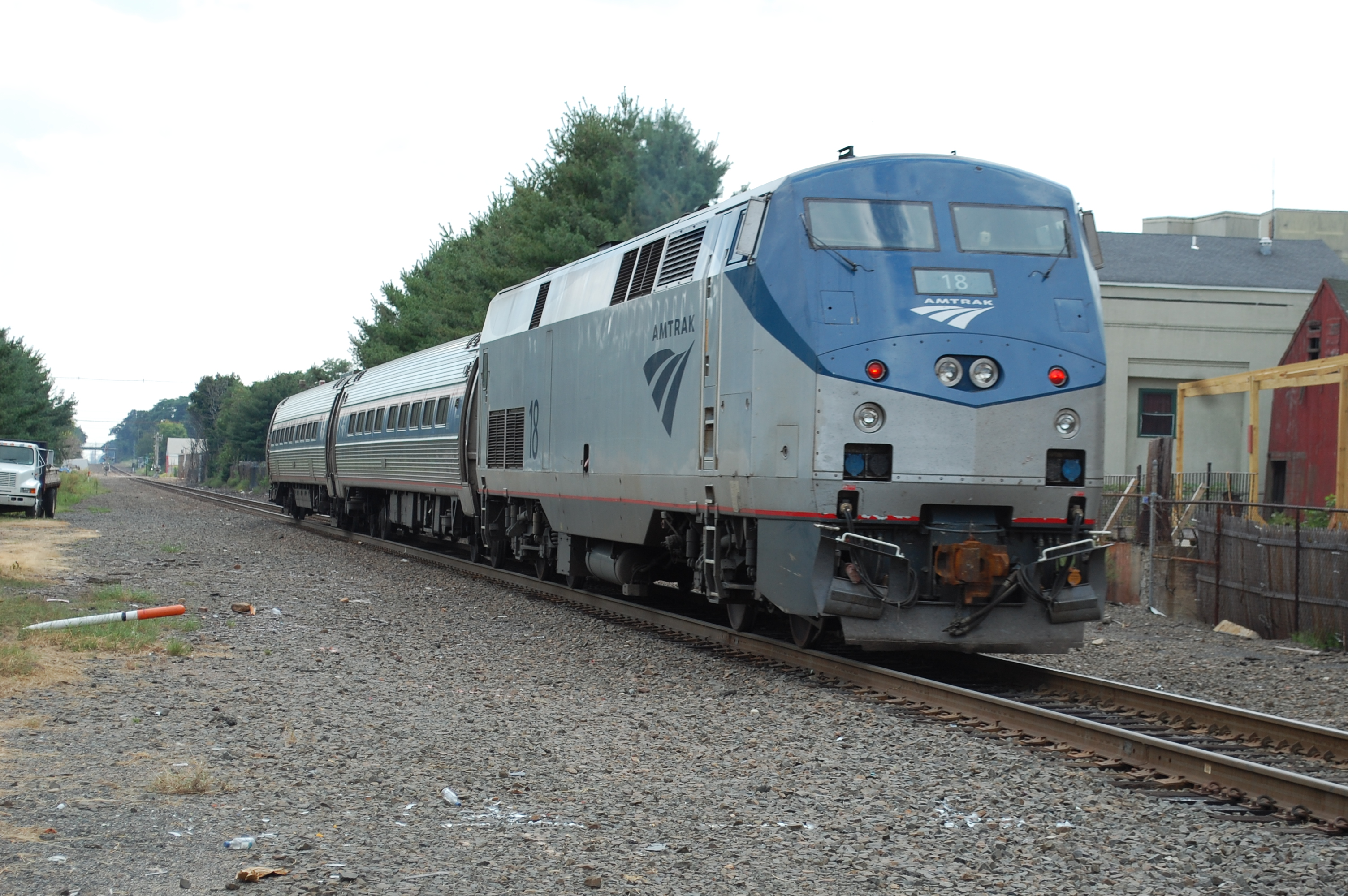
An Amtrak locomotive and two coaches on a train serving Northampton. Three round-trips serve the city each day.

Northampton enjoys a moderate amount of passenger rail service via Amtrak’s Vermonter and Valley Flyer lines, with three daily round trips operating between Springfield, Northampton, and Greenfield, Massachusetts. These trains serve intermediate and connecting points that include New York City, Boston, New Haven, and other destinations along the Northeast Corridor. Additional and more frequent service is located a 25-minute drive south at Springfield Union Station, which also houses the Peter Pan bus terminal.

In addition to passenger service, rail freight is offered by Pan Am Southern LLC via the Berkshire and Eastern Railroad, which is owned, in turn, by the Genesee & Wyoming.

The rail route through Northampton was historically known as the Connecticut River Line. Although passenger service through the area lapsed in the later part of the twentieth century, service resumed in 2014 following decades of local advocacy and government investment.

=== Bus ===
The Pioneer Valley Transit Authority operates several local passenger buses that originate in Northampton, with service to local towns such as Amherst, Williamsburg, Hadley, South Hadley, and Holyoke as well as the nearby universities and colleges: Mount Holyoke College, Amherst College, University of Massachusetts Amherst, and Hampshire College. The Franklin Regional Transit Authority operates a bus to Greenfield, Massachusetts, with fourteen round trips per day. There is a Peter Pan Bus stop with services to Springfield, Amherst, and other locations in New England.

In January 2026 the three regional transit authorities in Western Mass launched Link413, a joint collaboration that offers customers three new longer-distance, weekday bus routes providing direct service across four counties and enabling out-of-state connections. With the launch of the Link413 service, a new weekday bus was established between Northampton and Pittsfield along the Route 9 corridor.

=== Airports ===
Northampton Airport is a small general aviation airport located one mile northeast of the Northampton central business district. The closest major airport is Bradley International Airport, located roughly 43 kilometres (27 miles) to the south in Windsor Locks, Connecticut, near the CT-MA state line.

=== Bicycle ===
Northampton serves as the hub of a growing rail trail network. The north-south Manhan Rail Trail extends from the downtown into neighboring Easthampton, and as part of the Farmington Canal Trail is planned eventually to reach New Haven, Connecticut. The Norwottuck Branch of the Mass Central Rail Trail runs eastward from Woodmont Road through Hadley, Amherst, and into Belchertown, with planned future integration into the Mass Central Rail Trail to Boston. To the west, the Northampton Bikeway provides access to the city's Florence and Leeds neighborhoods, with a route through historic Look Park, which continues into Haydenville, where it ends. While downtown, the bikeway runs alongside the train tracks, and provides an alternative route to King and Main Streets.

== Points of interest ==
The Connecticut River in Northampton

- First Church on Main Street was the home church of Jonathan Edwards, 18th century theologian, philosopher, and leader of the First Great Awakening.
- The Elm Street/Round Hill Historic District runs from the commencement of Elm at State Street almost one mile westerly to Woodlawn Avenue and includes a section of Round Hill Road. A local historic district, it includes examples of a range of architectural styles from 18th century colonial to contemporary, with an abundance of Queen Anne and Colonial Revival homes and other styles.
- The Sojourner Truth Memorial at the intersection of Pine and Park Streets in Florence commemorates abolitionist, orator, and Florence resident Sojourner Truth.
- The Connecticut River and The Oxbow are popular areas for boaters.
- 21% of Northampton is protected open space; this includes the Broad Brook/Fitzgerald Lake Conservation Area, Connecticut River Greenway (Elwell and Rainbow Beach), Mill River Greenway, Mineral Hills Conservation Area, and Saw Mill Hills/Roberts Hill Conservation Area.
- Look Park is a recreational park covering over 150 acres (61 ha), founded in 1930. The park is free for visitors arriving by foot or bicycle, consistent with the will of Frank Newhall Look, who left the property to the city and requested that the park would always have free admission for the public. A day-use fee or annual membership fee provides for parking. Musicians such as Bob Dylan have played at the park's amphitheater.
- Childs Park is a 40-acre (16 ha) city park near Cooley Dickinson Hospital. It features two ponds, formal gardens and rose gardens, and an Italian-style garden house.
- The Botanic Garden of Smith College is a diverse, outdoor collection of trees, shrubs, and plants as well as having collections of plant conservatories for the tropics, semitropics, and desert regions. It also includes an indoor greenhouse.
- The Mill River Greenway is a walking path on Smith College and adjacent land along the Mill River in the Bay State Village neighborhood of Northampton. The path is sometimes also called the Paradise Pond Trail based on a misleadingly named portion of the river near Smith College's boathouse and pier.
- Northampton is a rail trail hub. The Norwottuck Rail Trail extends 18 miles (29 km) from Leeds, Florence, and the downtown sections of Northampton to Amherst and Belchertown. The Manhan Rail Trail extends 8 miles (13 km) from the Norwottuck Rail Trail through Northampton and Easthampton to Southampton. Four other rail trail extensions are in the planning process.
- The Three County Fair is the "longest consecutive running agricultural fair in the country", having been established and incorporated in 1818.
- The Iron Horse Music Hall is among the many venues that play host to Northampton's music scene.
- The Academy of Music, built in 1890 by Edward H. R. Lyman, is the earliest known municipally owned theater in the United States. Boris Karloff and Harry Houdini (who installed a trap door in the stage) performed there. Today it serves as a music venue, cinema, and performance space.
- The Northampton Independent Film Festival (NIFF) is held each fall. Founded as the Northampton Film Festival in 1995, it has continued to grow under a variety of directors. It is now one of the largest in New England.
- Forbes Library, built in 1894, is Northampton's public library. The second floor houses the Calvin Coolidge Presidential Library and Museum. Charles Ammi Cutter, an important figure in American library science, was the library's first director, and the library is one of few in the world that use the Cutter Expansive Classification system, rather than Dewey Decimal or Library of Congress.
- Mirage Studios, creators of the Teenage Mutant Ninja Turtles franchise, was based in Northampton.
- As part of an annual Springfest celebration, students from the Northampton Community Music Center (NCMC) fill the streets with music on the third Saturday of May.
- LGBT Pride, on the first Saturday of May, is an annual lesbian, gay, bisexual and transgender pride march and rally, with a parade down Main Street that ends with an all-day festival at a designated location in town.
- Thornes Marketplace, in downtown Northampton, has many shops and eateries.
- Northampton State Hospital was a large psychiatric hospital constructed in 1856. All of the site has been redeveloped.
- On a small hill overlooking the city, near the site of the former Northampton State Hospital, a simple stone monument marks the spot of the hangings of Domenic Daley and James Halligan, two Irishmen wrongfully convicted of murder in 1806.

== Notable people ==
U.S. President Calvin Coolidge worked as a lawyer in Northampton and served as the city's mayor from 1910 to 1911. He went on to be a Massachusetts state senator, lieutenant governor, and governor before becoming vice-president and president of the United States. After retiring from the U.S. presidency in 1929, Coolidge moved back to Northampton. He died in the city on January 5, 1933.

== In popular culture ==
Films shot in Northampton include Who's Afraid of Virginia Woolf? (1966), Malice (1993), In Dreams (1999), The Cider House Rules (1999), Sylvia (2003), and Edge of Darkness (2010). Other cultural references include:

- Northampton is the birthplace of the eponymous protagonist in Henry James's 1875 novel Roderick Hudson.
- Northampton is the setting for several stories throughout various Teenage Mutant Ninja Turtles media, especially the original Mirage comics (1984–2014) as well as the 2003 animated series. While not specifically referred to by name, the city is featured in the 1990 live-action movie. It was also the real-life headquarters for Mirage Studios, the original owners of the franchise.
- Writer Tracy Kidder documented the many layers of Northampton society at the end of the 20th century in his 1999 nonfiction book Home Town.
- Augusten Burroughs' 2002 memoir Running with Scissors takes place in Northampton
- A 2011 episode of Saturday Night Live (season 37, episode 8) featured a sketch titled "Massachusetts Afternoon" set in Northampton.
- Northampton is the principal setting for the webcomic Questionable Content, by Jeph Jacques.

== See also ==
- Tofu Curtain – Cultural or socioeconomic divide in Western Massachusetts
- USS Northampton, three ships
