= Guy Kirkham =

American architect (1864–1935)

- Born: December 14, 1864; Springfield, Massachusetts
- Died: March 6, 1935 (aged 70); Springfield, Massachusetts
- Occupation: Architect
- Awards: Fellow, American Institute of Architects (1897)
- Practice: Guy Kirkham; Kirkham & Parlett

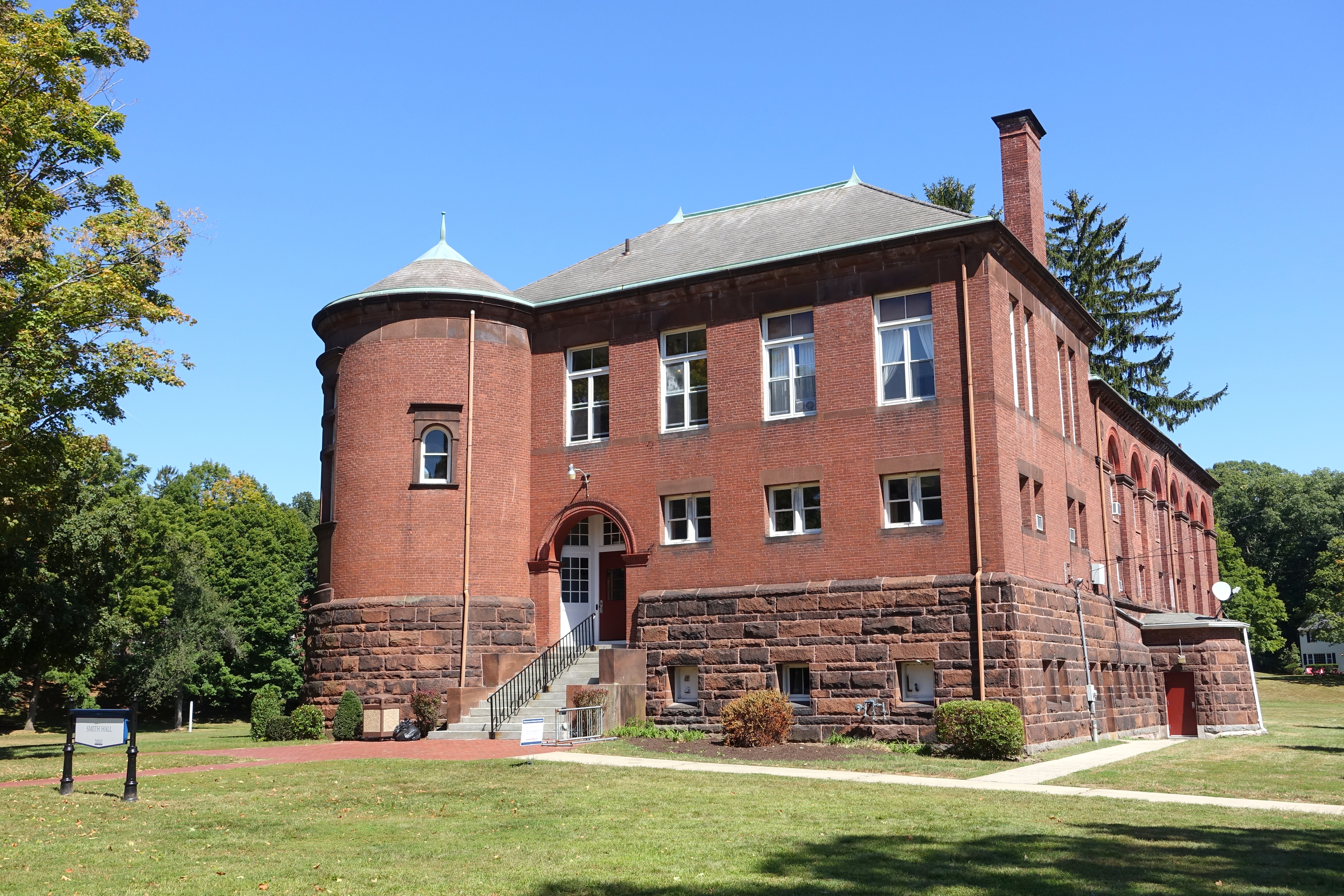
Smith Hall of Wilbraham & Monson Academy, designed by Kirkham in the Italian Renaissance Revival style and completed in 1896.

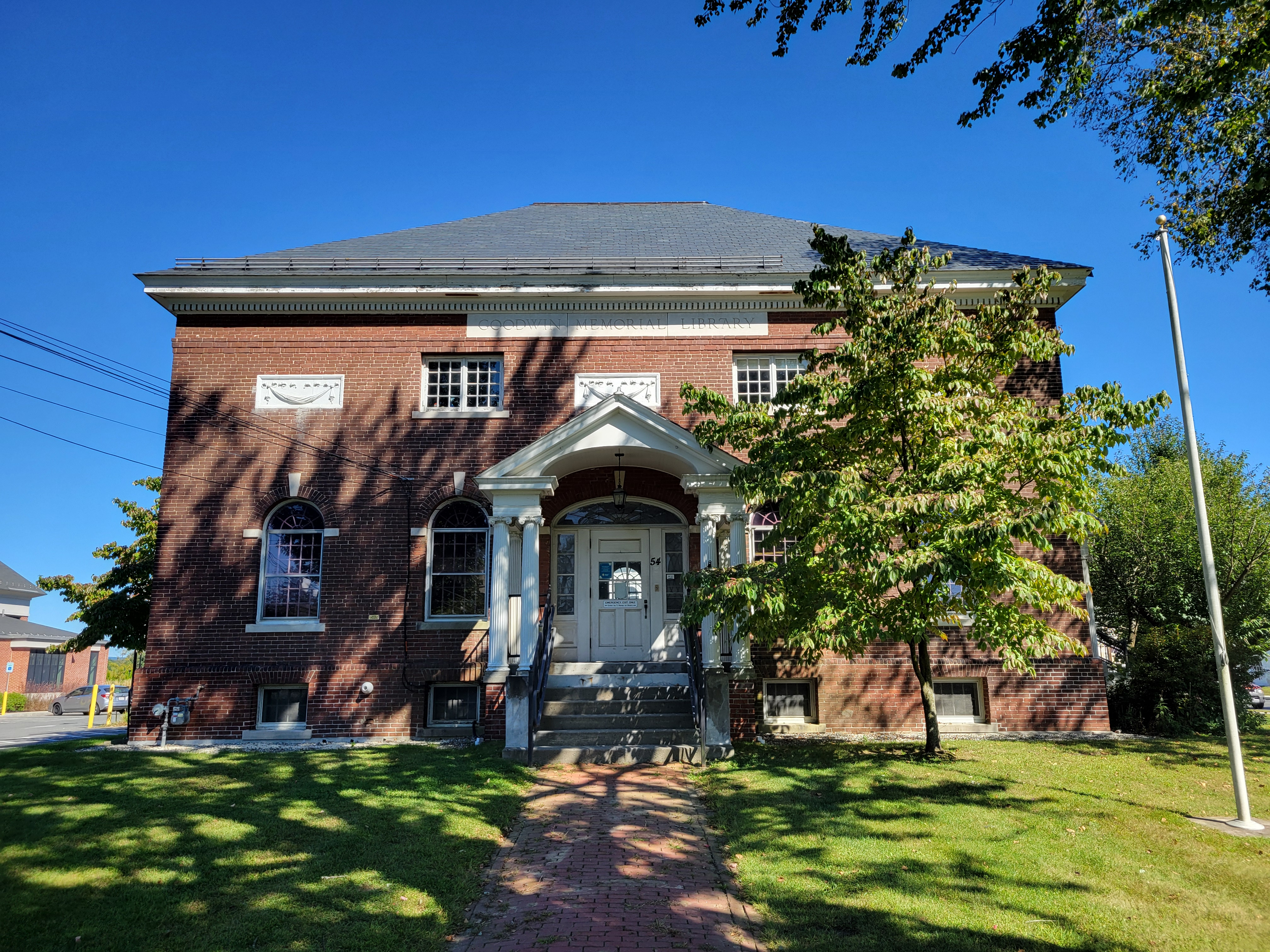
The former Goodwin Memorial Library in Hadley, designed by Kirkham in the Colonial Revival style and completed in 1902.

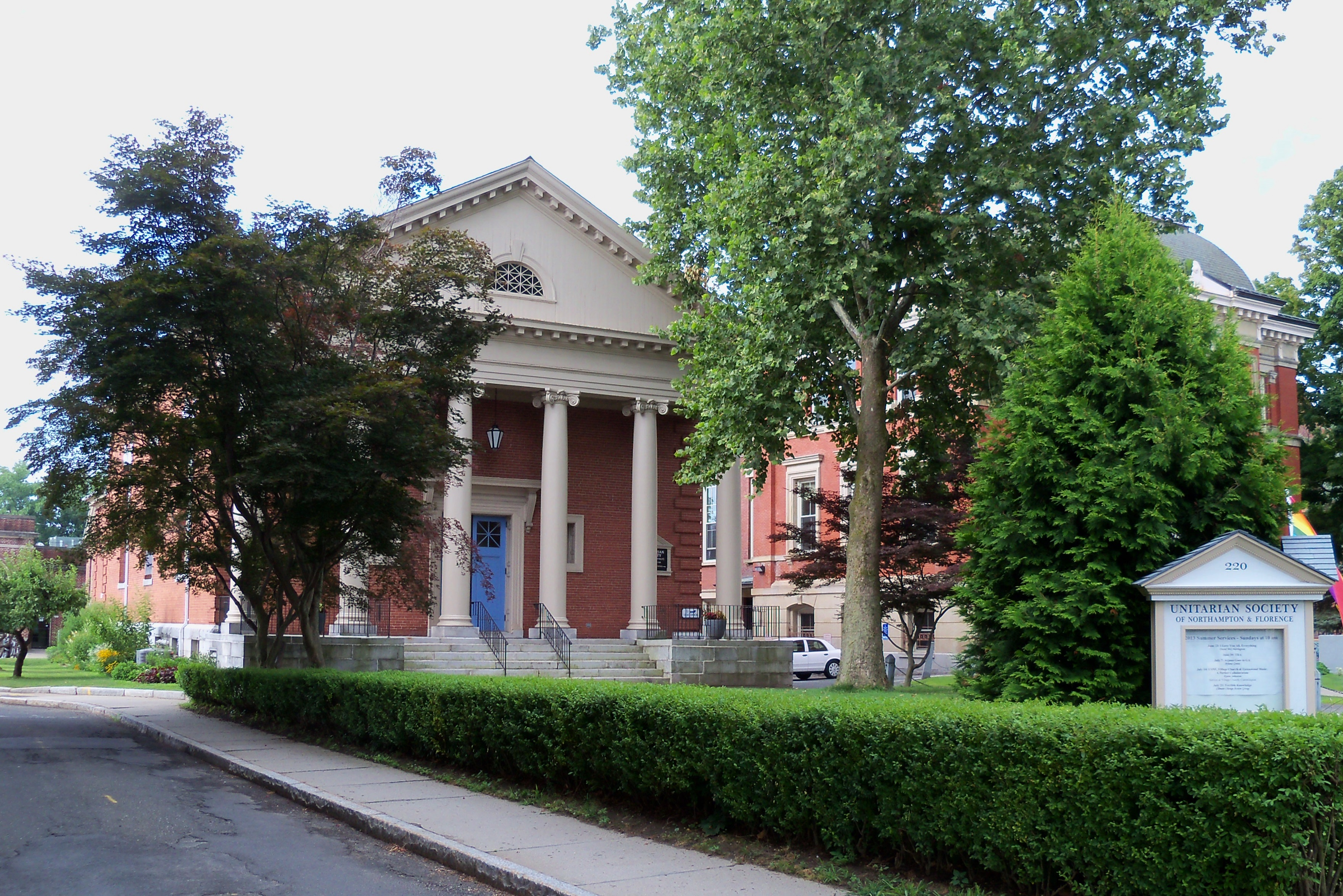
The Unitarian Society of Northampton and Florence in Northampton, designed by Kirkham in the Colonial Revival style and completed in 1905.

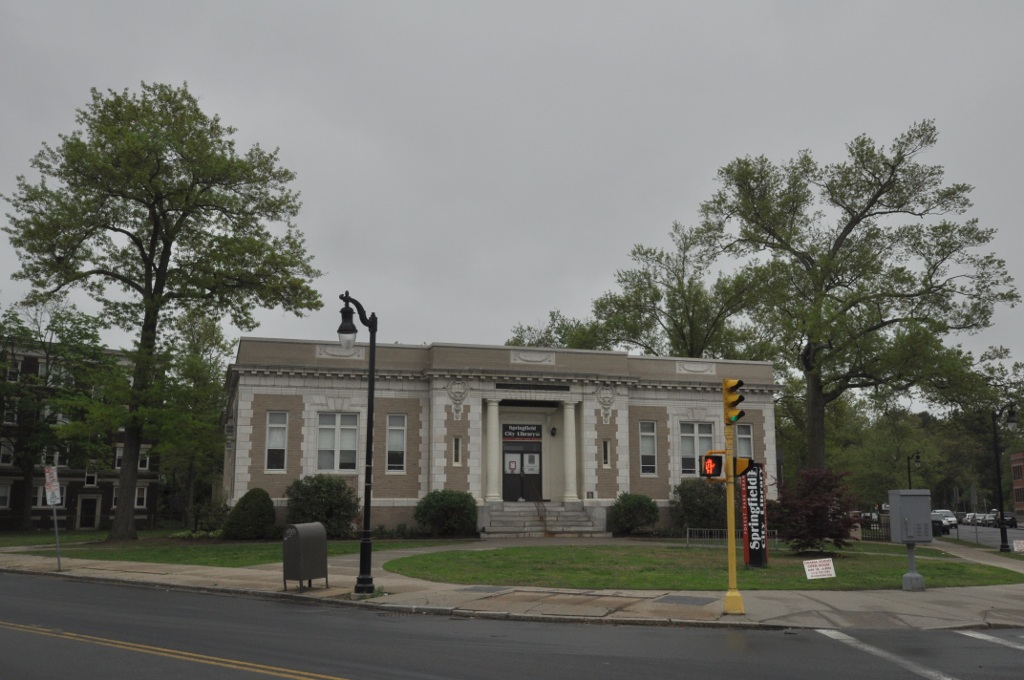
The Forest Park branch of the Springfield City Library, designed by Kirkham & Parlett in the Neoclassical style and completed in 1909.

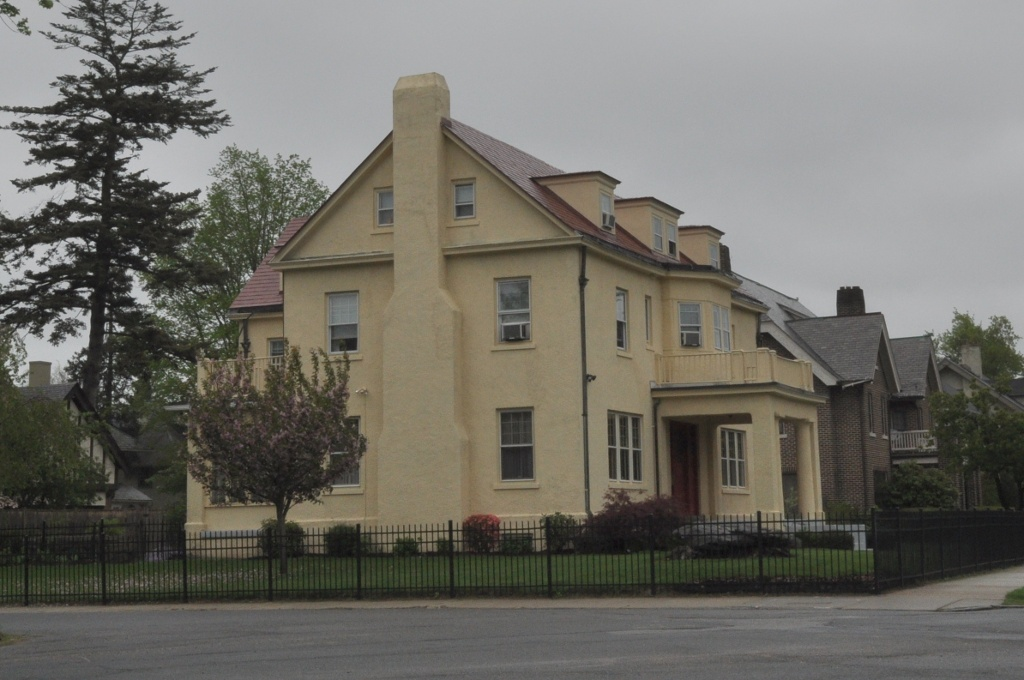
The Leo L. Ley house in Springfield, designed by Kirkham & Parlett in the Arts and Crafts style and completed in 1911.

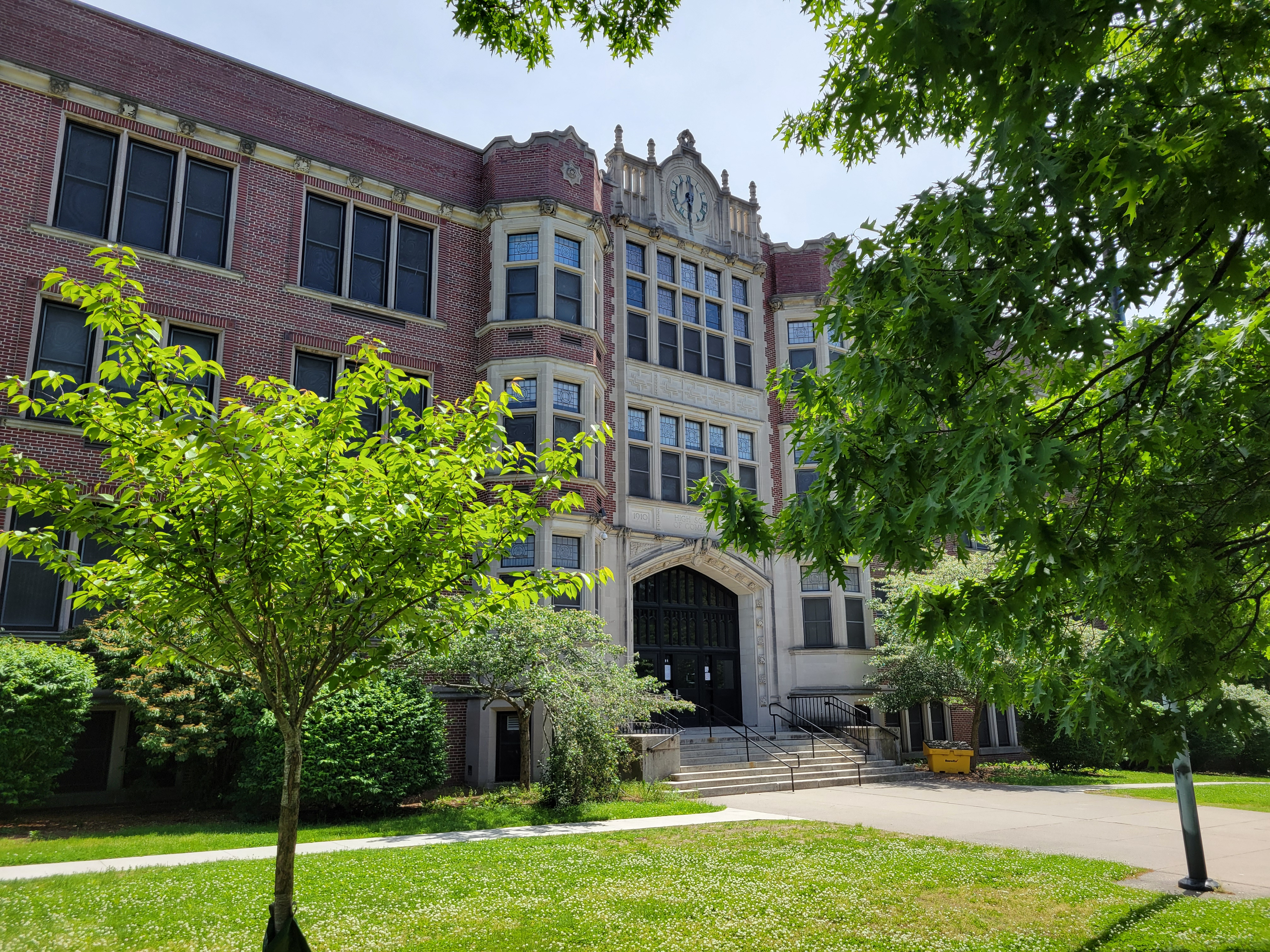
The High School of Commerce in Springfield, designed by Kirkham & Parlett in the Tudor Revival style and completed in 1915.

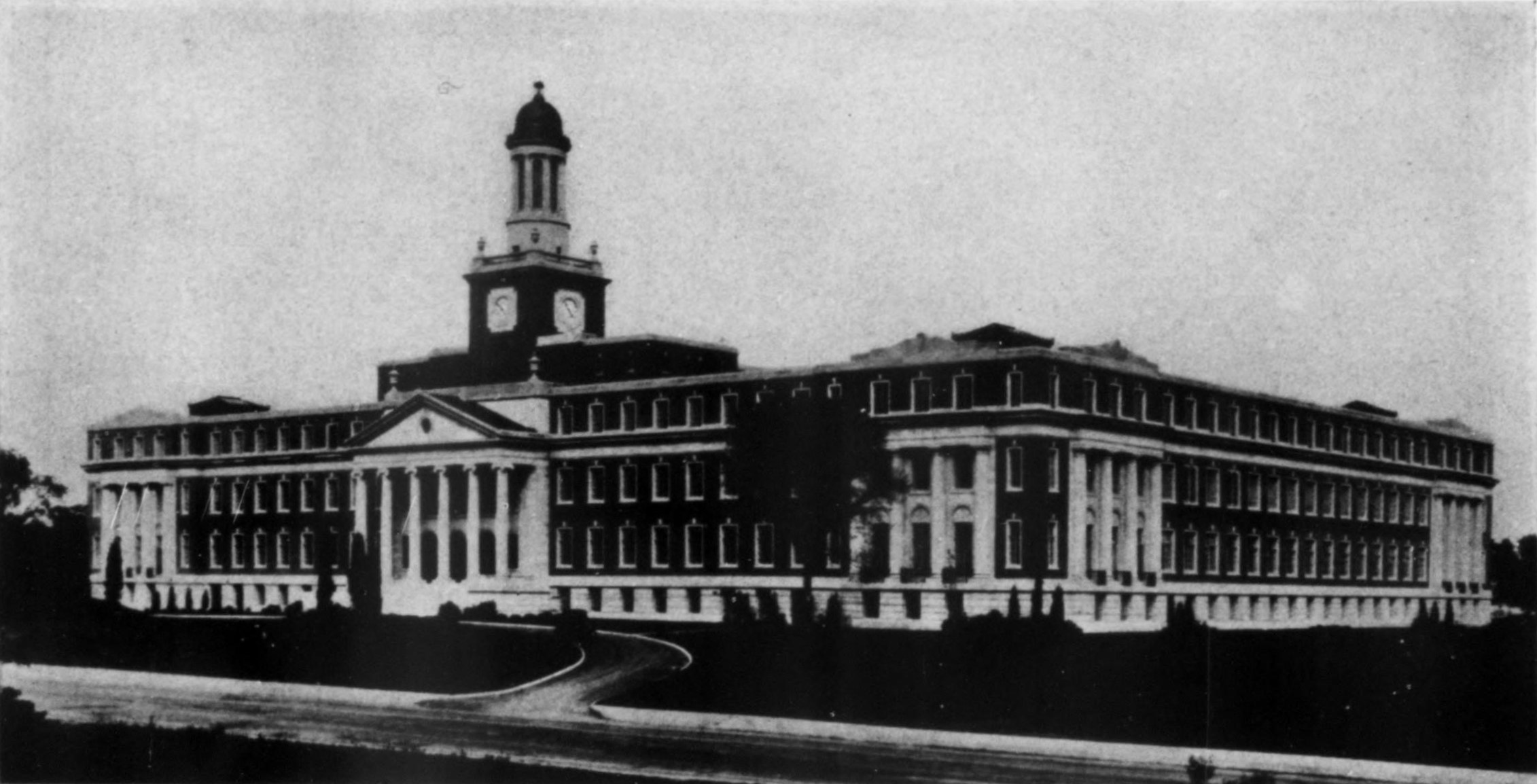
The Massachusetts Mutual Life Insurance Company headquarters in Springfield, designed by Kirkham & Parlett in the Colonial Revival style and completed in 1926.

Guy Kirkham FAIA (November 13, 1864 – August 3, 1935) was an American architect in practice in Springfield, Massachusetts, from 1892 until his retirement in 1932. From 1904 until his retirement he was senior partner of the firm of Kirkham & Parlett.

== Life and career ==
Guy Kirkham was born November 13, 1864 in, Springfield, Massachusetts, to William Kirkham Jr., a jeweler, and Harriet Newell Kirkham, née Merriam. His maternal grandfather was Charles Merriam, a founder in 1831 of what is today Merriam-Webster. His father died when he was young, and when he was about thirteen his mother remarried to Charles D. Hosley, another jeweler.

Kirkham was educated in the Springfield public schools and at St. Paul's School before entering the Massachusetts Institute of Technology as a special student in architecture, studying with the class of 1887. He worked for Gilbert & Taylor in St. Paul from 1886 to 1888, for Renwick, Aspinwall & Russell in New York City from 1888 to 1890 and for Gardner, Pyne & Gardner in Springfield from 1890 to 1892, excepting much of the year 1890–91, which he spent traveling in Europe. In 1892 he opened an office of his own in Springfield. He was a sole practitioner until 1904, when he formed the partnership of Kirkham & Parlett with architect Edwin J. Parlett. (Note: Parlett came to Springfield in 1893 as representative of Bruce Price to superintend the construction of the house of Daniel B. Wesson. After completion of the house Parlett practiced independently in Springfield until forming his partnership with Kirkham.) Kirkham and Kirkham & Parlett developed a large practice in western Massachusetts. They designed many large public and private buildings, most notably the High School of Commerce, completed in 1915, and the headquarters of the Massachusetts Mutual Life Insurance Company, completed in 1926. Parlett died in April 1931, and Kirkham retired in 1932.

In 1928 Kirkham was appointed to the Springfield park commission by mayor Fordis C. Parker. He was reappointed in 1929 and was elected chairman in 1930, making him an ex officio member of the planning board. He served until 1934, when he declined reappointment.

In 1897 Kirkham joined the American Institute of Architects (AIA) as a Fellow. He was the first AIA Fellow from the Springfield area. He was a member of several social and fraternal organizations in Springfield and was involved in local philanthropic causes.

== Personal life ==
Kirkham was married in 1892 to Grace Freeman Dwight of Springfield. Her grandfather, George Dwight, was a rifle manufacturer who served as the last civilian superintendent of the Springfield Armory. He is credited with successfully ramping up rifle production at the start of the American Civil War.

Kirkham had one son and three daughters. They lived in the McKnight neighborhood of Springfield, in two successive houses designed by Kirkham. The first was built in 1892 and designed in the Shingle Style, the second in 1909 in the Arts and Crafts style. He was a parishioner of the Church of the Unity, the building of which was the first completed work of architect H. H. Richardson.

Kirkham died August 3, 1935, in Springfield at the age of 70.

== Legacy ==
After Kirkham's retirement, Kirkham & Parlett was continued by Charles E. Hamilton, an associate since 1928, under his own name. Hamilton died in December 1944 and did not leave a professional successor.

At least one of Kirkham's works has been listed on the United States National Register of Historic Places, and others contribute to listed historic districts.

== Architectural works ==
=== Guy Kirkham, to 1904 ===
- 1889 – Charles D. Hosley house, (Note: Designed for Kirkham's mother and stepfather while he was working for Renwick, Aspinwall & Russell.) (Note: A contributing resource to the McKnight District, NRHP-listed in 1978.) 1166 Worthington St, Springfield, Massachusetts
- 1892 – Guy Kirkham house, 145 Clarendon St, Springfield, Massachusetts
- 1894 – Charles A. Bowles house, 81 Mulberry St, Springfield, Massachusetts
- 1896 – Smith Hall, Wilbraham & Monson Academy, Wilbraham, Massachusetts
- 1897 – Home for Friendless Women and Children (former), 136 William St, Springfield, Massachusetts
- 1900 – Springfield Home for Aged Women (former), 471 Chestnut St, Springfield, Massachusetts
- 1902 – Goodwin Memorial Library (former), (Note: A contributing resource to the Hadley Center Historic District, NRHP-listed in 1977.) 48 Middle St, Hadley, Massachusetts
- 1905 – Unitarian Society of Northampton and Florence, (Note: A contributing resource to the Northampton Downtown Historic District, NRHP-listed in 1976.) 220 Main St, Northampton, Massachusetts

=== Kirkham & Parlett, 1904–1932 ===
- 1904 – Woods Hall, (Note: Demolished.) Springfield College, Springfield, Massachusetts
- 1905 – Howard Street School, 59 Howard St, Springfield, Massachusetts
- 1906 – Charles B. Hitchcock house, (Note: A contributing resource to the Forest Park Heights Historic District, NRHP-listed in 1982.) 321 Longhill St, Springfield, Massachusetts
- 1908 – Springfield Day Nursery, 103 William St, Springfield, Massachusetts
- 1909 – All Saints Episcopal Church (former), 41 Oakland St, Springfield, Massachusetts
- 1909 – Bookstore Building, 1383 Main St, Springfield, Massachusetts
- 1909 – Guy Kirkham house, 120 Clarendon St, Springfield, Massachusetts
- 1909 – Springfield City Library Forest Park branch, 300 Belmont Ave, Springfield, Massachusetts
- 1911 – Leo L. Ley house, 46 Randolph St, Springfield, Massachusetts
- 1911 – Frederick H. Stebbins house, 86 Bowdoin St, Springfield, Massachusetts
- 1912 – Menagerie and stable buildings, Forest Park, Springfield, Massachusetts
- 1913 – Chicopee Public Library (former), 31 Center St, Chicopee, Massachusetts
- 1913 – Olivet Congregational Church (former), 33 Oak St, Springfield, Massachusetts
- 1915 – High School of Commerce, 415 State St, Springfield, Massachusetts
- 1917 – Springfield Day Nursery (former), 27 Pendleton St, Springfield, Massachusetts
- 1920 – Forbes & Wallace department store, Main St and Boland Way, Springfield, Massachusetts
- 1923 – William H. Sargeant house, 406 Longhill St, Springfield, Massachusetts
- 1924 – Adams Hall, American International College, Springfield, Massachusetts
- 1924 – Henry F. Punderson house, 25 Riverview Ter, Springfield, Massachusetts
- 1925 – DAR Hall, American International College, Springfield, Massachusetts
- 1926 – Massachusetts Mutual Life Insurance Company headquarters, 1295 State St, Springfield, Massachusetts
- 1927 – Christ Church Cathedral tower, (Note: Originally completed in 1876 and designed by Lord, Fuller & Wadlin. The tower began to fail soon thereafter and was demolished. A contributing resource to the Quadrangle–Mattoon Street Historic District, NRHP-listed in 1974.) 35 Chestnut St, Springfield, Massachusetts
- 1929 – Morgan Block, (Note: NRHP-listed.) 313-333 Bridge St, Springfield, Massachusetts
- 1931 – Springfield Isolation Hospital (former), 1400 State St, Springfield, Massachusetts
