= Trinity Block =

Building in Springfield, Massachusetts

- U.S. National Register of Historic Places
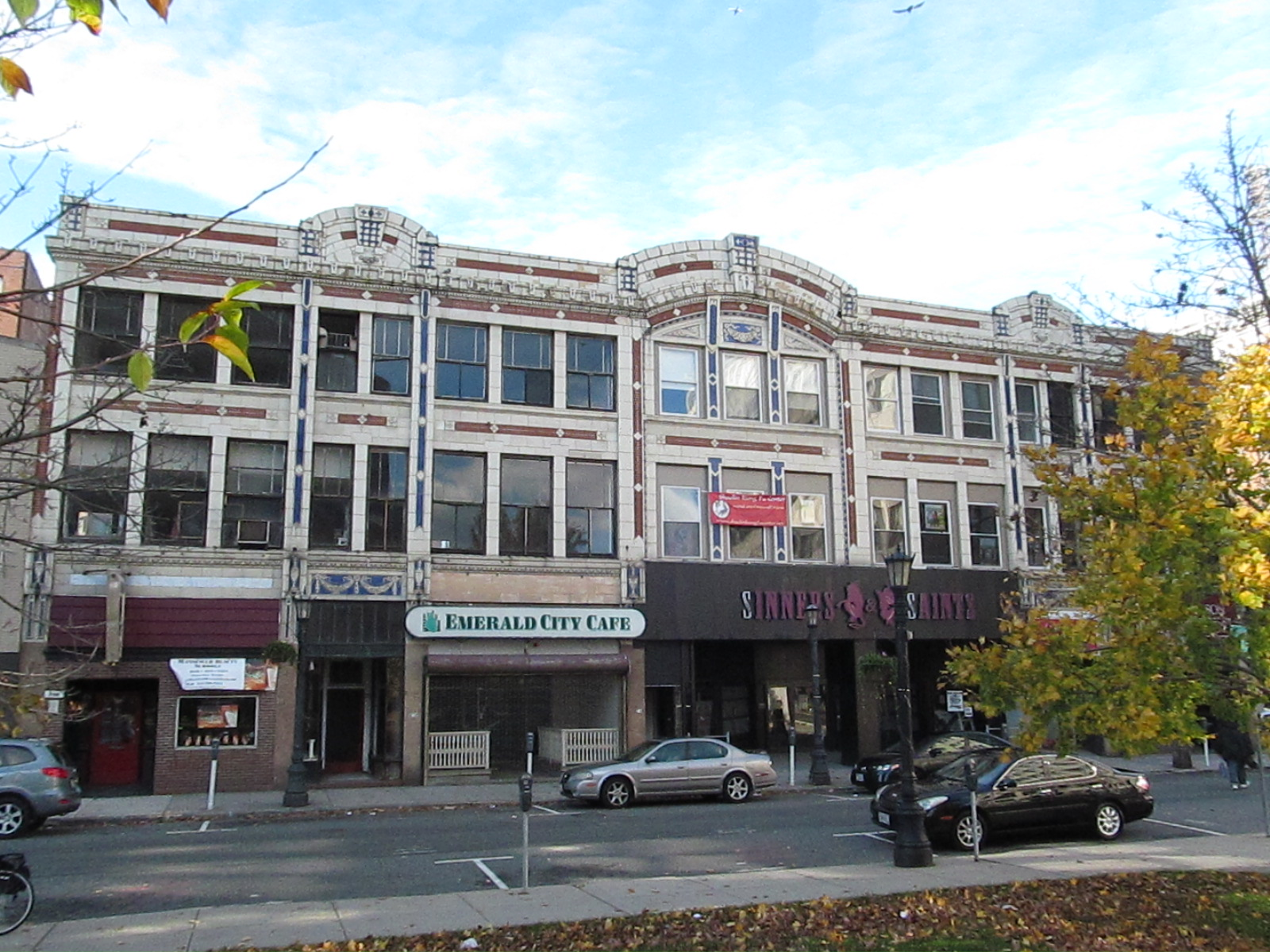
- Trinity Block

- Location within Massachusetts Location within the United States
- Location: 266-86 Bridge Street; Springfield, Massachusetts
- Coordinates: 42°6′15″N 72°35′35″W
- Area: less than one acre
- Built: 1923
- Architect: Green, Samuel M.
- Architectural style: Early Commercial
- MPS: Downtown Springfield MRA
- NRHP reference No.: 83000771
- Added to NRHP: February 24, 1983

The Trinity Block is a historic commercial building at 266-284 Bridge Street in downtown Springfield, Massachusetts. Built in 1923, the mixed-use retail and office building is noted for its colorful facade, finished in cast stone and terra cotta. It was added to the National Register of Historic Places in 1983.

== Description and history ==
The Trinity Block is located in downtown Springfield, on the north side of Bridge Street opposite its junction with Barnes Street. It is a three-story structure, faced in cast stone and terra cotta. The facade is divided on the ground floor into five retail bays, with two building entrances set one storefront in on each side. The building entrances are framed by a combination of stone and terra cotta trim with Classical Revival decorative motifs. Most of the storefronts have recessed entries and display windows, with a band of tall transom-like windows above. The facade sections are articulated on the upper levels by slightly projecting stone piers with colored terra cotta detailing, with additional terra cotta bands in between the second and third floors, and between the third floor and cornice. The cornice has rounded elements above the building entrance bays and the center storefront bay, with keystones and more colored terra cotta.

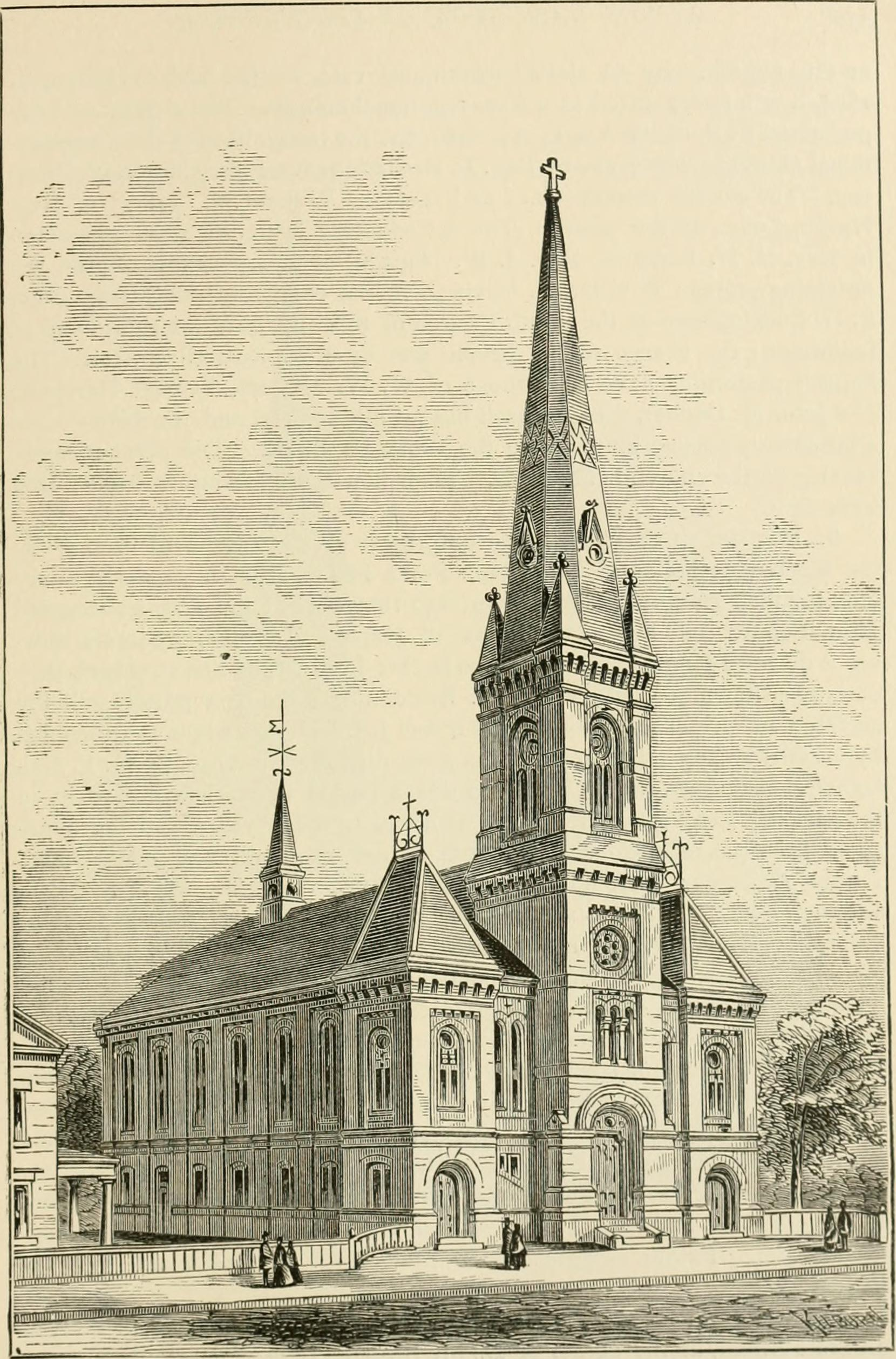
Trinity Church

The Trinity Methodist Episcopal Church, established in 1844 as the Union Street Methodist Church, was built on this site in 1869. The building, designed by Martin & Thayer of Boston, was built in the Romanesque Revival style. It was demolished in 1922, and this building was constructed in its place. It was designed by Samuel F. Green, a prominent local architect whose offices were in the Stearns Building, just across the street.

== See also ==
- Fitzgerald's Stearns Square Block, formerly stood next door
- National Register of Historic Places listings in Springfield, Massachusetts
- National Register of Historic Places listings in Hampden County, Massachusetts
