= Gordon Scruton =

The Right Reverend Gordon Paul Scruton.
- Bishop of Western Massachusetts
- Church: Episcopal Church
- Diocese: Western Massachusetts
- Elected: June 29, 1996
- In office: 1996–2012
- Predecessor: Robert S. Denig
- Successor: Douglas John Fisher

Orders
- Ordination: 1972
- Consecration: October 12, 1996 by Edmond L. Browning

Personal details
- Born: March 8, 1947 (age 79) Rochester, New Hampshire, United States
- Denomination: Anglican
- Spouse: Rebecca Scruton
- Children: 2

Gordon Paul Scruton (born March 8, 1947) is a former Bishop of Western Massachusetts from 1996 to 2012.

== Early life, education and career ==
Scruton was born in 1947 in Rochester, New Hampshire. He received a master's degree in English, magna cum laude, from Barrington College, then studied at the Boston University School of Theology, receiving a master's degree in theology in 1971. Scruton married Rebecca S. Polley in 1968. He was ordained a deacon in 1971, a priest in 1972, and served as an assistant rector at St. Mark's Church in Riverside, Rhode Island and at St. Paul's Church in Kingston, Rhode Island in the mid-1970s. Scruton was rector of Grace Church in Dalton, Massachusetts from 1977 to 1981, and St. Francis Church in Holden, Massachusetts thereafter.

== Bishop of Western Massachusetts ==
Scruton was elected the eighth Bishop of the Episcopal Diocese of Western Massachusetts on June 29, 1996. He was consecrated bishop on October 12, 1996, in Springfield, Massachusetts. He was consecrated by the following current or retired bishops: Alexander Stewart, Andrew Wissemann, M. Thomas Shaw, Barbara Clementine Harris, and Emmanuel Kolini (Bishop of the Diocese of Shaba in Zaire). Presiding Bishop Edmond Lee Browning was also a consecrator.

Likewise, Scruton was a co-consecrator of George Edward Councell as eleventh bishop of New Jersey.

He has been very active in the House of Bishops since 2001. Scruton has been on the court for the trial of a bishop. He has acted as a mediator in the dispute between the Bishop of Connecticut and some priests in that state in 2007. In 2009, he also served on a committee to assist the Diocese of Southern Virginia in their internal conflicts. He retired on December 1, 2012.

== See also ==
- List of bishops of the Episcopal Church in the United States of America
- Episcopal Diocese of Western Massachusetts

Episcopal Church (USA) titles
Preceded by Robert S. Denig	Bishop of Western Massachusetts; 1996–2012	Succeeded by Douglas John Fisher
