= Morgan Block =

- U.S. National Register of Historic Places
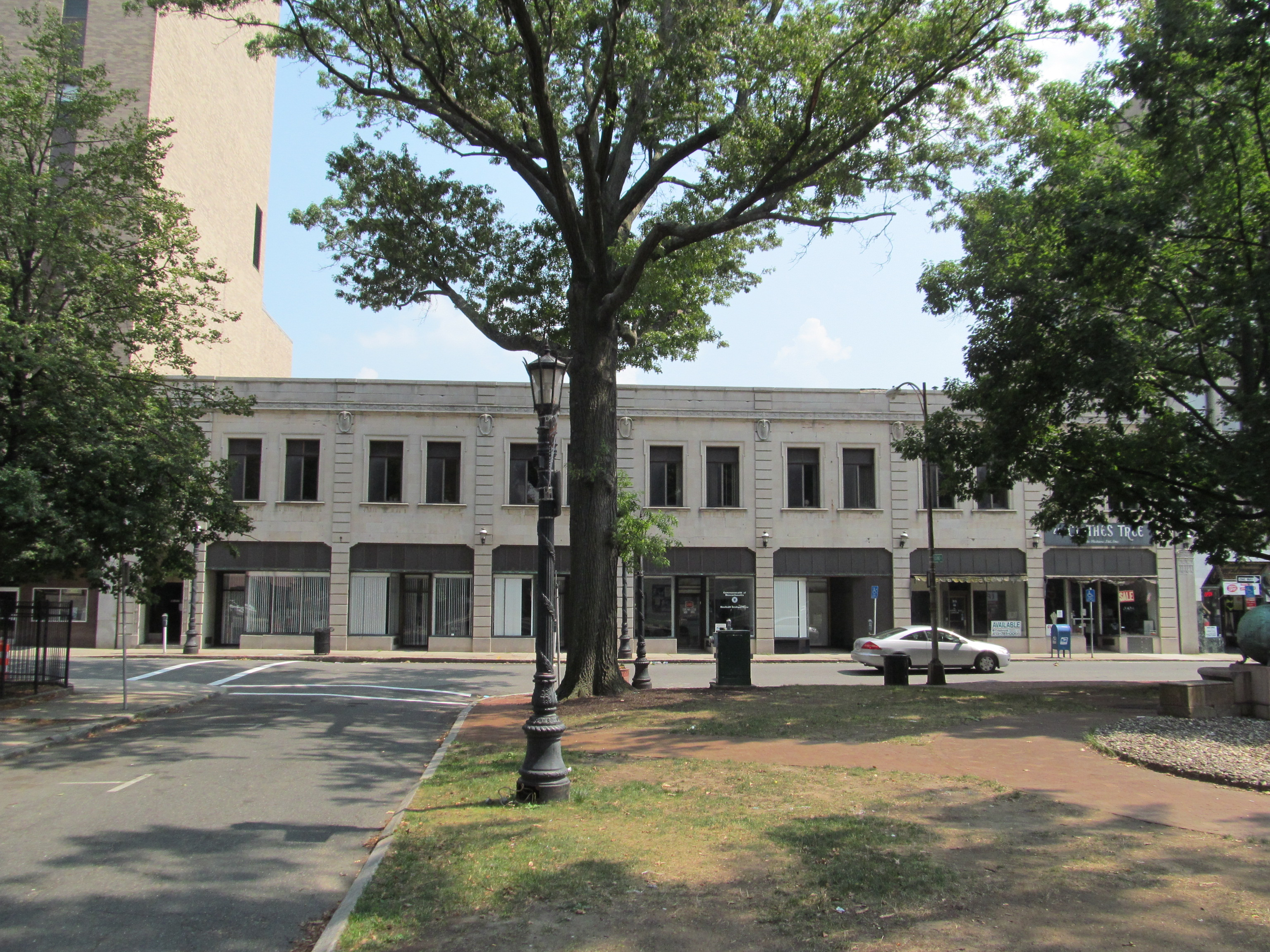
- Morgan Block

- Location within Massachusetts Location within the United States
- Location: 315-333 Bridge St., Springfield, Massachusetts
- Coordinates: 42°6′15″N 72°35′27″W
- Area: less than one acre
- Built: 1929
- Architect: Kirkham & Parlett
- Architectural style: Classical Revival
- MPS: Downtown Springfield MRA
- NRHP reference No.: 83000757
- Added to NRHP: May 27, 1983

The Morgan Block is a historic commercial block at 313-333 Bridge Street (facing Stearns Park) in Springfield, Massachusetts. When the two story Classical Revival building was built in 1929, it was probably a speculative real estate venture by the Morgan Envelope Company, whose factory abutted the property in the rear. It was designed to house stores on the first floor and offices on the second, functions it continues to perform. It was rehabilitated in the early 1980s and listed on the National Register of Historic Places in 1983.

== Description and history ==
The Morgan Block is located in downtown Springfield, on the south side of Bridge Street at the southern end of Stearns Park. It is a long two-story building, with a brick exterior. The front is divided into seven bays articulated by quoined brick piers, with a building entrance in a round-arch opening at the left end. The piers are topped by Classical medallions, and a low parapet extends across the top. The ground-floor bays originally housed individual retail storefronts with recessed entrances, but most of these have been replaced with plate glass windows set on granite bases. On the second floor there are two sash windows in each bay, set in separate rectangular openings.

The block was built in 1929 to a design by Kirkham & Parlett, on what was previously the site of a laundry. The building was first owned by the Morgan Realty Company, probably a development arm of the nearby Morgan Envelope Company. The building has always housed commercial and retail businesses. It is one of the better-preserved of this type of 1920s building in the city.

== See also ==
- Stearns Building, 289-309 Bridge Street (next door)
- Fitzgerald's Stearns Square Block, 300-308 Bridge Street
- National Register of Historic Places listings in Springfield, Massachusetts
- National Register of Historic Places listings in Hampden County, Massachusetts
