= Robert S. Denig =

American bishop

The Right Reverend Robert Scott Denig D.Min.
- Bishop of Western Massachusetts
- Church: Episcopal Church
- Diocese: Western Massachusetts
- Elected: October 3, 1992
- In office: 1993–1995
- Predecessor: Andrew F. Wissemann
- Successor: Gordon Scruton

Orders
- Ordination: January 8, 1973 by Alexander Doig Stewart
- Consecration: February 20, 1993 by Edmond L. Browning

Personal details
- Born: July 5, 1946 Mount Vernon, New York, United States
- Died: May 20, 1995 (aged 48) Boston, Massachusetts, United States
- Denomination: Anglican
- Spouse: Nancy Howard Watkins
- Children: 2

Robert Scott Denig (July 5, 1946 - May 20, 1995) was seventh bishop of the Episcopal Diocese of Western Massachusetts, serving from February 1993 until his death in May 1995.

== Education ==
Denig was born on July 5, 1946, in Mount Vernon, New York. He was educated at Amherst College and the Divinity School of the University of Chicago where he trained for the priesthood.

== Ordination ==
Denig was ordained deacon on June 17, 1972, and served as curate at St John's Church in Northampton, Massachusetts. He was ordained priest on January 6, 1973, by Bishop Alexander Doig Stewart of Western Massachusetts. He served as chaplain at the University of Massachusetts and later rector of All Saints Church in South Hadley, Massachusetts from 1975 to 1979. Denig went to West Germany in 1979 and became rector of the Church of Christ the King in Frankfurt where he remained till 1984. That same year he became rector of Holy Comforter Church in Vienna, Virginia.

== Episcopacy ==
Upon the retirement of Bishop Andrew F. Wissemann, Denig was elected to succeed him as Bishop of Western Massachusetts on October 3, 1992. He was consecrated bishop on February 20, 1993, by Presiding Bishop Edmond L. Browning and installed as bishop a day later on February 21. Denig served on standing committees and commissions on ministry and was a preacher and workshop leader on spirituality and stewardship. He also served as deputy to General Convention for the Convocation of American Churches in Europe. In April 1994, he was diagnosed with Multiple myeloma. In December of the same year he received a bone marrow transplant from his sister however he succumbed to his illness on May 20, 1995, at the Dana Farber Cancer Institute in Boston.

== Personal life ==
Denig married Nancy Howard Watkins on June 14, 1968, and together they had two children.
