= Episcopal Diocese of Western Massachusetts =

Episcopal Church diocese in the US

Diocese of Western Massachusetts

Location
- Country: United States
- Ecclesiastical province: Province I

Statistics
- Congregations: 50 (2024)
- Members: 9,499 (2025)

Information
- Denomination: Episcopal Church
- Established: November 10, 1901
- Cathedral: Christ Church Cathedral

Current leadership
- Bishop: Miguelina Howell

Map
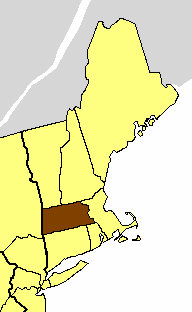
- Location of the Diocese of Western Massachusetts

Website
- www.diocesewma.org

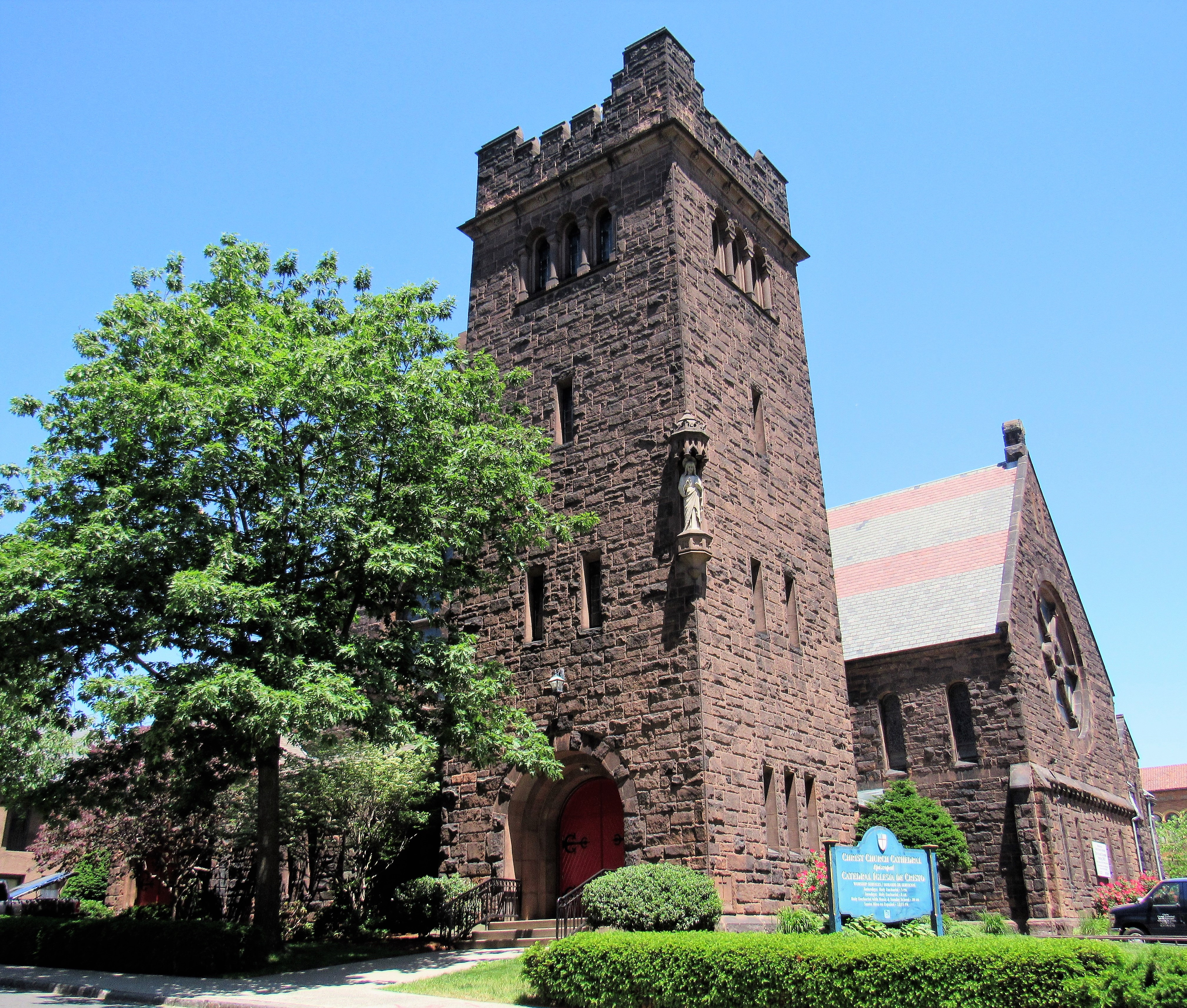
Christ Church Cathedral in Springfield

The Episcopal Diocese of Western Massachusetts is the diocese of the Episcopal Church in the United States of America in the five western counties of Massachusetts. Formed from a division of the Episcopal Diocese of Massachusetts, it was officially recognized at the organizing convention of November 10, 1901. At a special meeting on January 22, 1902, Alexander Hamilton Vinton, Rector of All Saints Church in Worcester, Massachusetts, was elected first diocesan bishop.

The first two Church of England parishes in what would become the diocese were started in Great Barrington in 1762 and Lanesborough in 1767 on the Housatonic River. They were served by priests from the Episcopal Diocese of Connecticut.

There are 50 congregations in the diocese. The Episcopal See is in the city of Springfield, Massachusetts. Since 1929, the cathedral has been Christ Church Cathedral, which was built in 1876. On November 15, 2025, the Rev. Miguelina Howell was elected diocesan bishop.

The diocese reported 15,032 members in 2015 and 9,499 members in 2025. Plate and pledge income for the 50 filing congregations of the diocese in 2025 was $6,617,513. Average Sunday attendance (ASA) was 2,346 persons. This was a relative decrease from 4,251 persons attending on an average Sunday reported in 2015.

== Shareholder activism ==
After the February, 2018 Stoneman Douglas High School shooting, on July 12, 2018, a resolution proposed by Western Massachusetts Episcopal Bishop Douglas John Fisher on a national plan to invest in firearms manufacturers and retailers as a form of shareholder advocacy was approved by the House of Bishops during the 79th meeting of the General Convention of the Episcopal Church in the United States of America in Austin, Texas. The Episcopal Diocese of Western Massachusetts purchased 200 shares, the minimum holding needed to qualify to formally submit shareholder resolutions, of Springfield, Massachusetts-based firearms manufacturer American Outdoor Brands Corporation (AOBC), the parent company of Smith & Wesson. The Diocese partnered with the Adrian Dominican Sisters on a shareholder resolution asking AOBC to report to investors regarding the steps they are taking to reduce gun violence. On February 8, 2019 AOBC released a 20-page report, which said, in summary, "AOBC's reputation among firearm buyers and Second Amendment supporters is more critical to the success of the Company and the enhancement of shareholder value than its reputation among industry detractors and special interest groups with a political agenda."

== Companion diocese ==
- Anglican Diocese of Kumasi, Ghana, Church of the Province of West Africa

== Bishops ==
1. Alexander Hamilton Vinton (1902–11)
2. Thomas Frederick Davies (1911–36)
3. William Appleton Lawrence (1937–57)
4. Robert McConnell Hatch (1957–70)
5. Alexander Doig Stewart (1970–84)
6. Andrew F. Wissemann (1984–92)
7. Robert S. Denig (1993–95)
8. Gordon Paul Scruton (1996–2012)
9. Douglas John Fisher (2012–2026)
10. Miguelina Howell (2026–present)

== See also ==
- Historical list of bishops of the Episcopal Church in the United States of America
