= Debney =

Debney is a surname. Notable people with the surname include:

- George Debney (1818–1897), English emigrant to Australia and cabinetmaker
- John Debney (born 1956), American film composer and conductor
- P. James Debney (born c. 1968), CEO and President of American Outdoor Brands Corporation
