= Douglas John Fisher =

American Episcopal bishop

The Right Reverend Douglas John Fisher
- Bishop of Western Massachusetts
- Church: Episcopal Church
- Diocese: Western Massachusetts
- Elected: June 2, 2012
- In office: 2012–2026
- Predecessor: Gordon Scruton
- Successor: Miguelina Howell

Orders
- Ordination: 1980 by John R. McGann
- Consecration: December 1, 2012 by Katharine Jefferts Schori

Personal details
- Born: Valley Stream, Long Island, United States
- Denomination: Anglican (prev. Roman Catholic)
- Spouse: Elizabeth Fisher
- Children: 3

Douglas John Fisher was the ninth bishop of the Episcopal Diocese of Western Massachusetts.

== Biography ==
Fisher was born in Valley Stream, Long Island and grew up as a Roman Catholic. He graduated with a Bachelor of Arts from St John's University. He also studied at the Immaculate Conception Seminary School of Theology where he earned a Master of Divinity, after which he was ordained priest for the Roman Catholic Diocese of Rockville Centre in 1980. Later, he earned a Doctor of Ministry from Episcopal Divinity School. In 1984, Fisher left the Roman Catholic priesthood and married Elizabeth Fisher. He joined the Episcopal Church and was received as an Episcopal priest on June 8, 1997 by Catherine Roskam. He served as rector of Holy Innocents Church in Highland Falls, New York, chaplain to United States Military Academy at West Point and chair of the standing committee for the diocese of New York. In 2000 he became rector of Grace Church in Millbrook, New York where he remained till 2012 when he was elected Bishop of Western Massachusetts on June 2. He was consecrated on December 1, 2012 by Presiding Bishop Katharine Jefferts Schori.

After the February, 2018 Stoneman Douglas High School shooting, on July 12, 2018 a resolution proposed by Fisher on a national plan to invest in firearms manufacturers and retailers as a form of shareholder advocacy was approved by the House of Bishops during the 79th meeting of the General Convention of the Episcopal Church in the United States of America in Austin, Texas. The Episcopal Diocese of Western Massachusetts purchased 200 shares, the minimum holding needed to qualify to formally submit shareholder resolutions, of Springfield, Massachusetts-based firearms manufacturer American Outdoor Brands Corporation (AOBC), the parent company of Smith & Wesson. The Diocese partnered with the Adrian Dominican Sisters on a shareholder resolution asking AOBC to report to investors regarding the steps they are taking to reduce gun violence. On February 8, 2019 AOBC released a 20-page report, which said, in summary, "AOBC’s reputation among firearm buyers and Second Amendment supporters is more critical to the success of the Company and the enhancement of shareholder value than its reputation among industry detractors and special interest groups with a political agenda."

== See also ==
- List of Episcopal bishops of the United States
- Historical list of the Episcopal bishops of the United States
