= Rob Hennigan =

American basketball executive (born 1982)

Oklahoma City Thunder
- Position: Vice President of Basketball Operations

Personal information
- Born: March 26, 1982 (age 44) Worcester, Massachusetts, U.S.

Career information
- High school: St. John's High School
- College: Emerson College

Career highlights
- NBA champion (2025)

Rob Hennigan (born March 26, 1982) is an American basketball executive who is Vice President of Basketball Operations with Oklahoma City Thunder. He is the former general manager of the Orlando Magic. Hired at age 30, he was the youngest GM in the NBA at the time of his hire.

Hennigan is a native of Worcester, Massachusetts. Hennigan graduated from St. John's High School in Shrewsbury, MA in 2000. He was a member of the state champion basketball team in 2000. He graduated from Emerson College in 2004 with a degree in broadcast journalism. At Emerson, he was a Division III All-American, Academic All-American, and the Great Northeast Athletic Conference Player of the Year for three seasons. He graduated Emerson as its all-time leading scorer. After college, he spent four years working for the San Antonio Spurs and another four years working for the Oklahoma City Thunder before taking the GM position at Orlando in 2012.

Rob has been married to his wife, Marissa, since 2005.

On April 30, 2015, the Orlando Magic extended the contract of Hennigan through the 2017–18 season. He was fired on April 13, 2017. In his five years as GM, the Magic posted a 132–278 record, the worst five-year stretch in team history. His interim replacement was assistant general manager Matt Lloyd for nearly a month before it was announced that Milwaukee Bucks general manager John Hammond would be his official replacement.

On October 2, 2017, Hennigan returned to Oklahoma City Thunder as Vice President of Insight & Foresight. He subsequently held the position of Assistant General Manager/Player Personnel. Following the departure of Troy Weaver as Vice President of Basketball Operations, Hennigan was promoted to that position on September 29, 2020 (sharing the title with Will Dawkins). Dawkins departed Thunder in 2023, as of 2026, Hennigan shares the title with Jesse Gould and Wynn Sullivan.

Preceded by Otis Smith	Orlando Magic general manager 2012–2017	Succeeded by John Hammond
