= Crimson Trace =

Crimson Trace Corporation
- Industry: Fire arms accessories
- Founded: 1994; 32 years ago
- Founder: Lewis Danielson
- Headquarters: 9780 SW Freeman Dr., Wilsonville, Oregon, United States
- Number of locations: 1 (2015)
- Key people: Lewis Danielson, founder and chairman Lane Tobiassen, president and CEO
- Products: Laser sights
- Brands: Lasergrips, Laserguard, Rail Master, Rail Master Pro, Defender Series, Master Series, Lightguard, MVF-515, CTC Defense
- Parent: American Outdoor Brands Corporation
- Website: crimsontrace.com

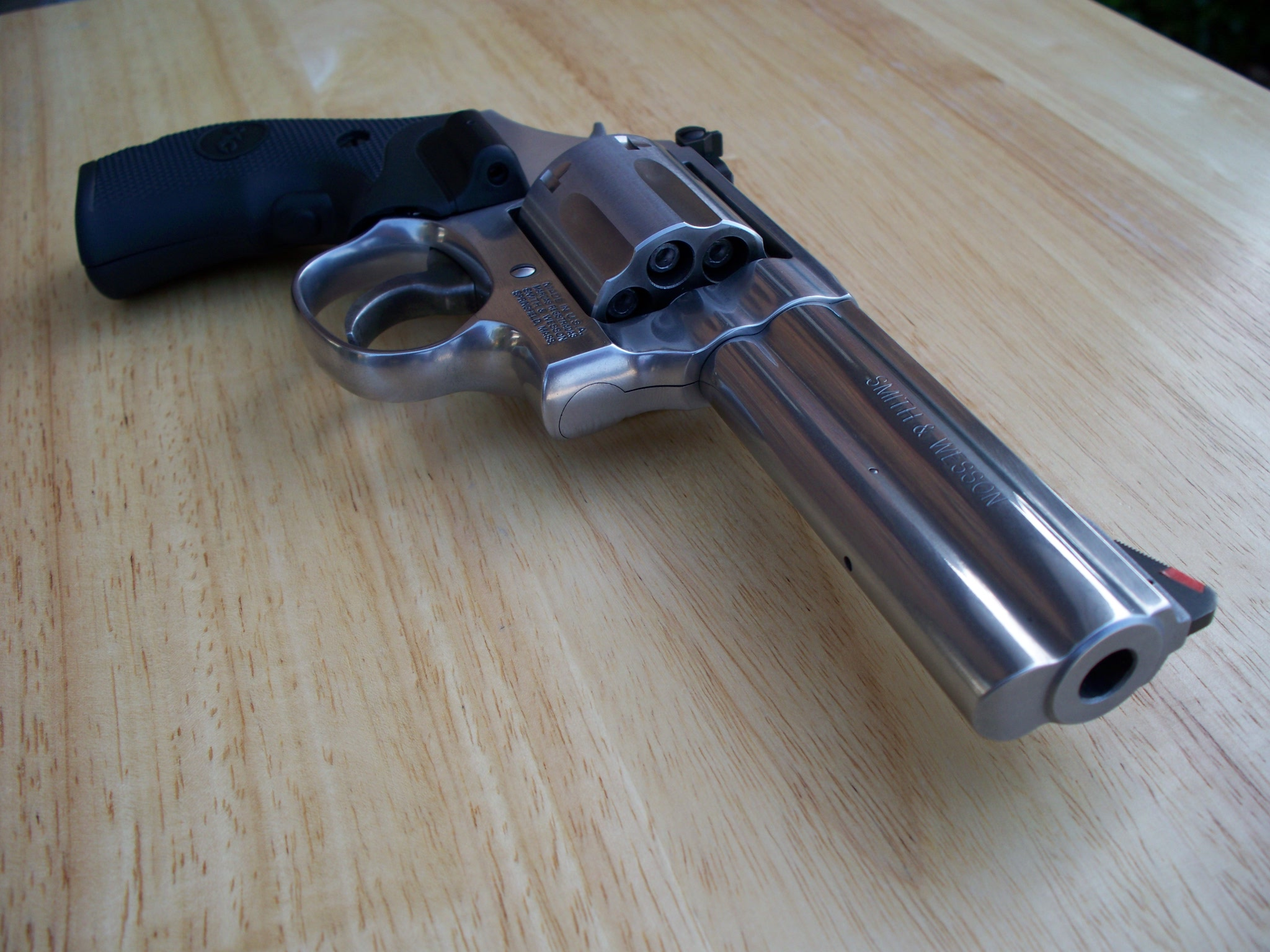
Smith & Wesson, Model 686 Plus equipped with Crimson Trace laser grip.

Crimson Trace is an American manufacturer of laser sight equipment, chiefly but not exclusively for pistols. The firm specializes in in-line upper-grip-mounted red and green laser units, trigger-guard mounted sights, and training units. Crimson Trace partners with manufacturers of firearms in product releases, with many models shipping with Crimson Trace lasers preinstalled.

In August 2016, Smith & Wesson purchased Crimson Trace for $95 million. The company was previously owned by Crimson Trace Holdings, backed by Peninsula Capital Partners and Lake Oswego-based VergePointe Capital.
