= Herbert Myrick =

Author, publisher, and political organizer in Massachusetts

Herbert Myrick (1860–1927) was an American editor, author, and publisher. He served as president and editor-in-chief of the Phelps Publishing Company. He wrote books on various agricultural and business subjects including the commercial cultivation of corn, hops, sugar, federal loans available for agriculture, turkeys, and tobacco. He served as secretary of the Farmers League. He founded the Farmers' Political League in 1901.

Phelps Publishing Company printed various publications. It burned in 1907. He died in Germany at a bath resort he traveled to for improved health. His estate was left to his wife.

His family's former home in Springfield, Massachusetts is part of the McKnight Historic District that is listed on the National Register of Historic Places.

== Writings ==
- "Creating New Industries" (1901)
- Cache La Poudre - The Romance of a Tenderfoot in the Days of Custer (1905) illustrated by Edward Deming (Edwin Deming?)
- "The Real Meaning of Prosperity" (1905)
- "The American Sugar Industry"
- Tobacco Leaf, Its Culture and Cure, Marketing and Manufacture: A Practical Handbook On the Most Approved Methods in Growing, Harvesting, Curing, ... Selling (1923)
- The Hop - Its Culture and Cure Marketing and Manufacture
- A Swim For Life, pseudonym Uncle Ted?
- Turkey and How to Grow Them
- "Rural Credits System for the United States"
- The Book of Corn
- A Revolution in Agriculture
- Sugar: a new and profitable industry in the United States for capital, agriculture and labor to supply the home market yearly with $100,000,000 of its product
- The American Sugar Industry (1915)
