= Miguelina Howell =

Episcopal bishop

Miguelina Howell is a Dominican Republic-born bishop in the Episcopal Church of America, currently serving as the 10th Bishop of Western Massachusetts, having previously been dean of Christ Church Cathedral in Hartford, Connecticut.

== Early life and education ==
Howell was born in the Dominican Republican and raised as a member of the Episcopal Church there. Her journey to ordained ministry began at a youth event she attended as a teenager, where she saw the Rev. Margarita Santana, the first female priest in the Dominican Republic, celebrating the Eucharist.

After obtaining a license in clinical psychology at the Universidad Nacional Pedro Henríquez Ureña in Santo Domingo, Howell studied for a degree in theology at the Centro de Estudios Teologicos, also in Santo Domingo, and became a youth ministry coordinator. In 1997 she attended a gathering in England ahead of the thirteenth Lambeth Conference, where she met the Archbishop of Canterbury, George Carey.

== Career ==
Howell was ordained as a deacon in 2002 and as a priest in 2003. She served as priest-in-charge of two rural parishes in the Dominican Republic, as well as executive assistance to the Bishop of the Dominican Republic.

In 2008 Howell was invited to serve as associate rector of St. Paul's Episcopal Church in Paterson, New Jersey, leading services in English for the first time, and later became the first female rector of the Church of the Epiphany in Orange, New Jersey. In 2013 she became vicar of Christ Church Cathedral in Hartford, Connecticut, and three years later was installed as the Cathedral's dean − the first Latina dean in the Episcopal Church of America.

On November 15, 2025, Howell was elected as the 10th Bishop of Western Massachusetts, succeeding Douglas John Fisher. Her consecration took place at Christ Church Cathedral in Springfield on April 25, 2026 in the presence of the Presiding Bishop of the Episcopal Church, Sean Rowe, as well as the former Presiding Bishop, Michael Curry. In the week before her consecration, she co-led an online Spanish language service with Rowe and other Latino church leaders as an "act of spiritual resistance" in solidarity with Latino communities in the United States.

Howell has also held roles at a diocesan, provincial and national level, including as a member of the Presiding Bishop's staff, chaplain to the House of Bishops, member of the Episcopal Church executive council, and board member of the Seminary of the Southwest.

== Personal life ==
She is married to Daniel Howell, with whom she has three sons.
