= Will Dawkins =

American basketball executive

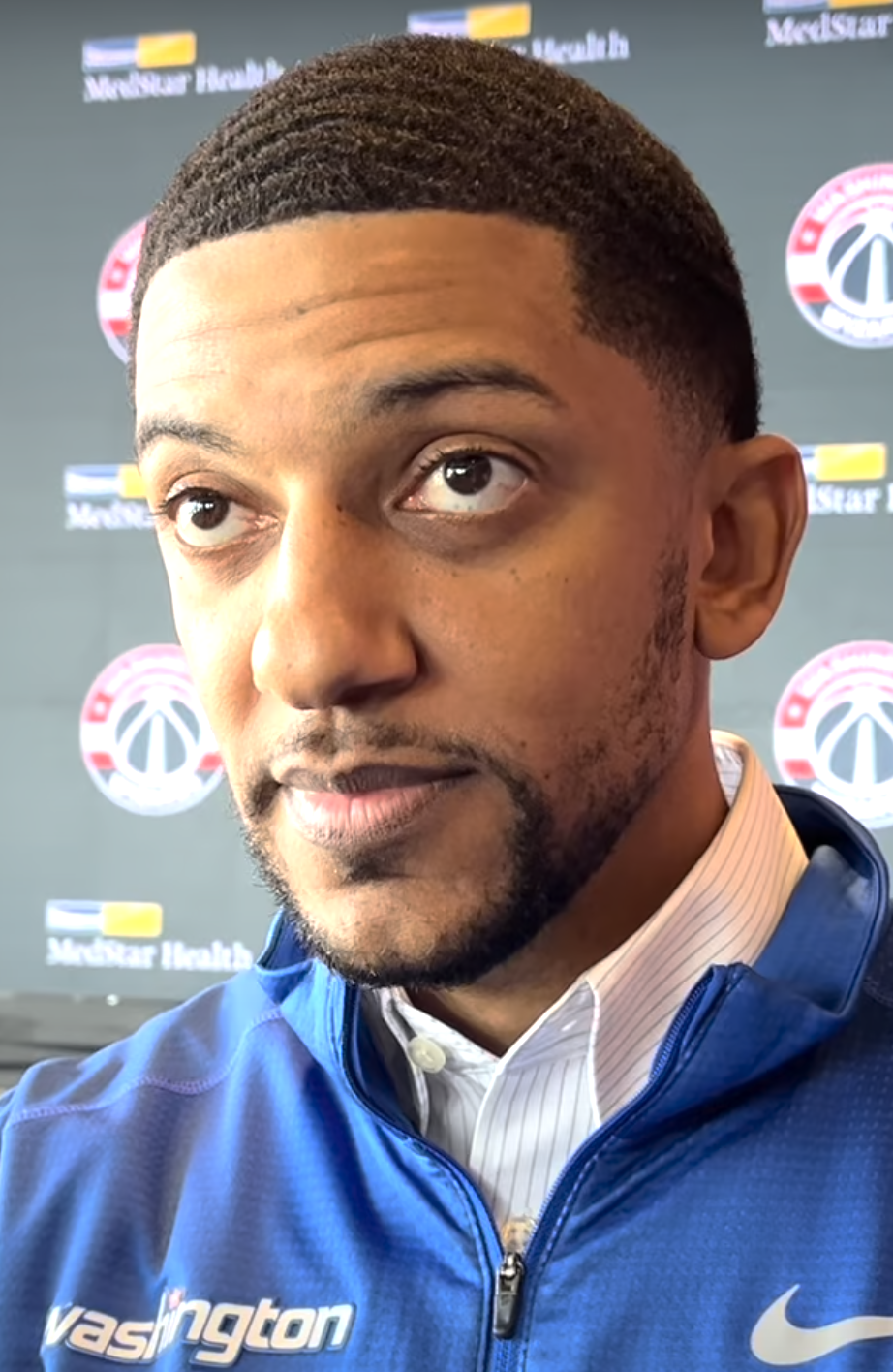
- Dawkins in 2023

Washington Wizards
- Position: General manager
- League: NBA

Personal information
- Born: Springfield, Massachusetts, U.S.

Career information
- High school: High School of Commerce (Springfield)
- College: Emerson (2004–2008)

Will Dawkins is an American basketball executive who is the general manager for the Washington Wizards of the National Basketball Association (NBA). He began his executive career with the Oklahoma City Thunder in 2008 before being hired by the Wizards as the team's general manager in 2023.

== Playing career ==
Dawkins played four years of basketball for Emerson College. At Emerson, Dawkins was named the Student Athlete of the Year in 2008 and joined the 1,000 point club in his career.

== Executive career ==
=== Oklahoma City Thunder (2008–2023) ===
Starting off as a front office intern, Dawkins held numerous roles with the Thunder as an assistant video coordinator, scouting coordinator, and as the director of college player personnel. After serving three seasons as the Vice President of Identification & Intelligence, Dawkins was promoted as the team's Vice President of Basketball Operations ahead of the 2020–21 season. He joined Rob Hennigan under general manager Sam Presti, both Emerson College graduates. In his role, Dawkins assisted in roster and staff development, strategic planning, and player evaluations and acquisitions.

=== Washington Wizards (2023–present) ===
On June 8, 2023, the Washington Wizards named Dawkins as the newest general manager following Michael Winger's hiring as the president of Monumental Basketball, which oversaw the Wizards. Dawkins and Winger previously worked together with the Thunder from 2010 until 2017 when Winger joined the Los Angeles Clippers.

Entering the 2023 NBA draft, the Wizards began transitioning into a rebuilding phase after missing the playoffs four times in five years. Following a report that the Wizards were exploring the possibility of trading Bradley Beal, Dawkins completed his first trade by trading Beal in a blockbuster deal to the Phoenix Suns in exchange for Chris Paul along with four first-round pick swaps and six second-round draft picks. Dawkins continued to revamp the roster, trading Kristaps Porziņģis to the Boston Celtics and re-routing Chris Paul to the Golden State Warriors in exchange for Jordan Poole. On draft night, Dawkins acquired the draft rights to Bilal Coulibaly, the 7th overall pick, in a trade with the Indiana Pacers. The Wizards ended the second-round drafting Tristan Vukčević with the 42nd overall pick and Trayce Jackson-Davis with the 57th overall pick. Before draft night ended, Dawkins traded Jackson-Davis to the Golden State Warriors in exchange for cash considerations. Dawkins ended his first draft night with Coulibaly and Vukčević. His final move he made prior to the season was off-loading veteran guard Monté Morris to the Detroit Pistons for a second-round pick.

On January 14, 2024, Dawkins traded Danilo Gallinari and Mike Muscala to the Detroit Pistons in exchange for Marvin Bagley III, Isaiah Livers, and two second-round draft picks. During the 2024 NBA Trade Deadline, Dawkins traded Daniel Gafford to the Dallas Mavericks in exchange for Richaun Holmes and a 2024 first-round draft pick via the Oklahoma City Thunder.

Heading into the 2024 NBA Draft, the Wizards held picks 2, 26, and 51. Just hours before the draft was scheduled to begin, Dawkins traded Deni Avdija to the Portland Trail Blazers in exchange for Malcolm Brogdon, a 2029 first-round pick, two future second-round picks, and the 14th overall pick in the 2024 draft which ended up becoming Bub Carrington. Just before the night ended, Dawkins traded the 26th and 51st pick to the New York Knicks in exchange for pick 24. In his second draft, Dawkins selected Alex Sarr with pick 2, Bub Carrington with pick 14, and Kyshawn George with pick 24.
