= Quadrangle–Mattoon Street Historic District =

Historic district in Massachusetts, United States

- U.S. National Register of Historic Places
- U.S. Historic district
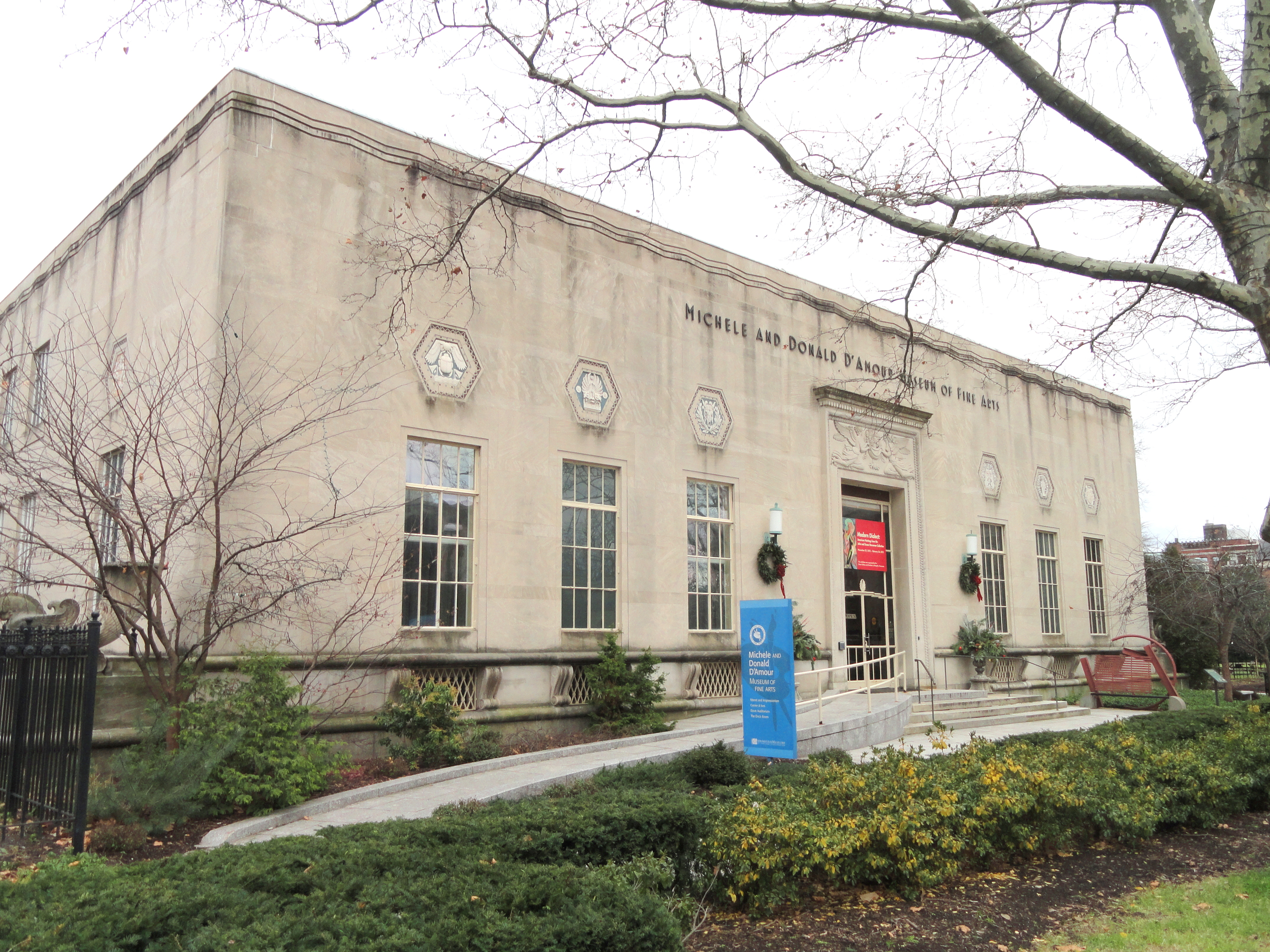
- Museum of Fine Arts

- Location within Massachusetts Location within the United States
- Location: Springfield, Massachusetts
- Coordinates: 42°6′16″N 72°35′10″W
- Built: 1811
- Architect: Richardson, H.H.; Et al.
- Architectural style: Mid 19th Century Revival, Late 19th And 20th Century Revivals, Late Victorian
- NRHP reference No.: 74000371 (original); 00001393 (increase)

Significant dates
- Added to NRHP: May 8, 1974
- Boundary increase: November 22, 2000

The Quadrangle–Mattoon Street Historic District is a historic district in Springfield, Massachusetts, bounded by Chestnut Street to the West; State Street to the South; and includes properties on Mattoon, Salem, Edwards and Elliot Streets. Located in the Metro Center, the Quadrangle–Mattoon Street Historic District is one of the few neighborhoods in the Knowledge Corridor lined with historic, restored red-brick Victorian row houses on both sides, covered by tree canopies.

The Quadrangle–Mattoon Street Historic District consists of housing stock of various architectural styles, from detached Victorian houses, to attached red-brick row-houses, to H.H. Richardson churches. The area contains Mid 19th Century Revivals and Late 19th And 20th Century Revivals.

Since 2006, Metro Center – and in particular, the Quadrangle–Mattoon Street Historic District – has seen a notable resurgence in residential living, with growing populations of people seeking an urban, cultural environment at reasonable prices, e.g. 20-somethings, LGBTs, bohemians, urban professionals, and empty-nesters. The Mattoon Street neighborhood features many of Springfield's most prestigious residential addresses, on Mattoon Street, Salem Street, Elliot Street, etc. It also features one of the famous architect H.H. Richardson's first works in the Richardsonian Romanesque style, the Hispanic Baptist Church. Early each Fall, the neighborhood hosts a large arts festival, "The Mattoon Street Arts Festival."

The historic district's namesake Quadrangle features a grouping of five museums around the Dr. Seuss Memorial Sculpture Garden. Recent developments include 2008's $57 million Moshe Safdie-designed, Federal Courthouse on State Street; and the TRO Jung|Brannen designed $101 million adaptive reuse of Springfield's original Technical High School for Massachusetts' Data Center.

== See also ==
- St. Michael's Cathedral (1861; contributing property)
- Christ Church Cathedral (1876; contributing property)
- Apremont Triangle Historic District
- National Register of Historic Places listings in Springfield, Massachusetts
- National Register of Historic Places listings in Hampden County, Massachusetts
