= Stearns Building =

- U.S. National Register of Historic Places
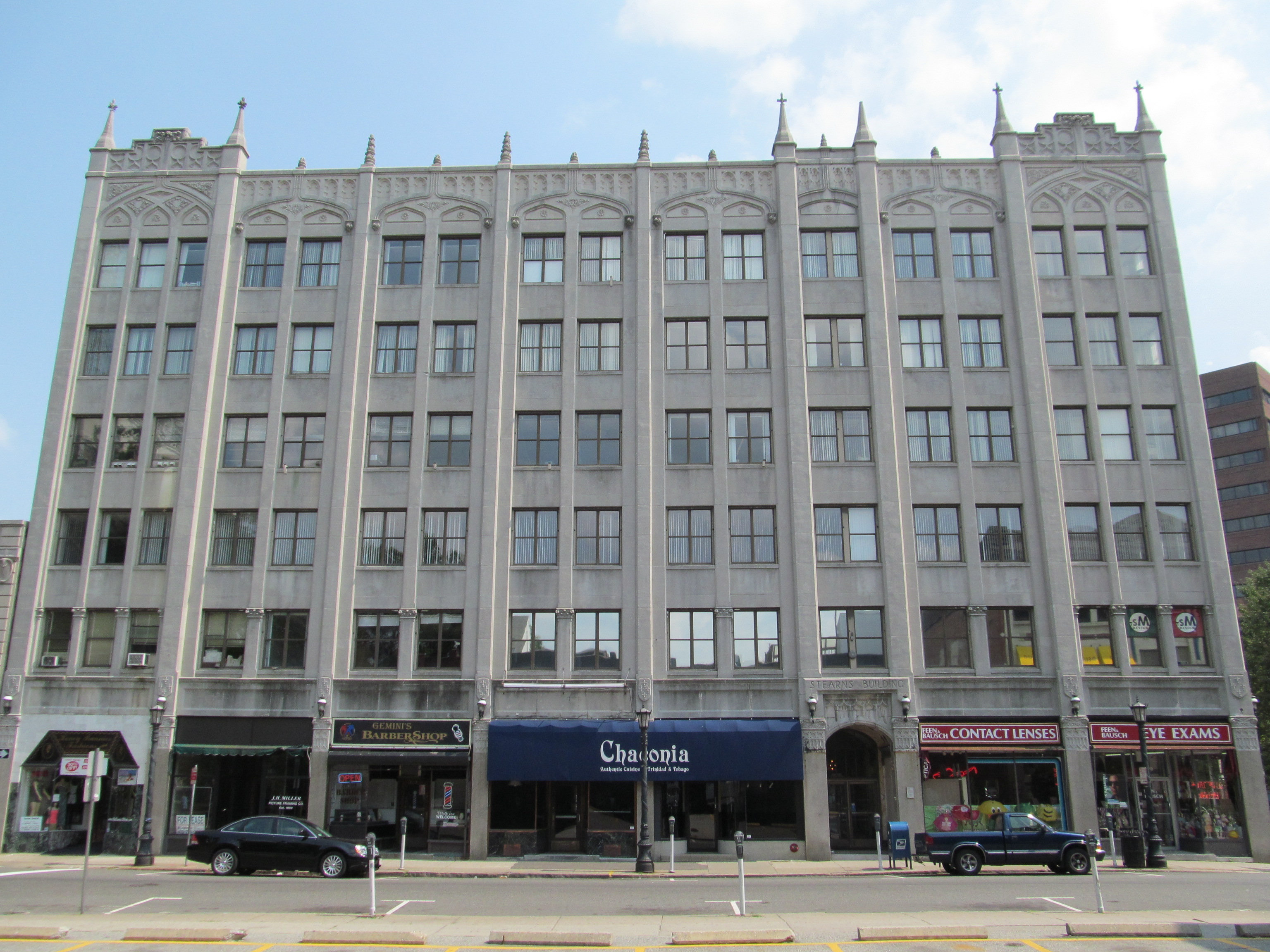
- Stearns Building

- Location within Massachusetts Location within the United States
- Location: 289–309 Bridge St., Springfield, Massachusetts
- Coordinates: 42°6′14″N 72°35′28″W
- Area: less than one acre
- Built: 1912
- Architect: Samuel M. Green Co.
- Architectural style: Gothic Revival
- MPS: Downtown Springfield MRA
- NRHP reference No.: 83000770
- Added to NRHP: February 24, 1983

The Stearns Building is a historic commercial building at 289–309 Bridge Street in downtown Springfield, Massachusetts. The six-story building was built in 1912 for the Dunlap Realty Group. It is an early example (and the best preserved) of Neo-Gothic design applied to large office buildings in Springfield. The building was listed on the National Register of Historic Places in 1983.

== Description and history ==
The Stearns Building is located in downtown Springfield, at the southeast corner of Bridge and Barnes Streets. It is a six-story structure, built out of steel and concrete with stone trim. Its facade is divided into nine sections, articulated by pilasters that rise to pinnacles at the very top. The outermost sections are each three bays wide, and have a stepped parapet between the pinnacles. All but one of the remaining sections are two bays wide; the last is a single bay wide, housing the main building entrance on the ground floor. Each of the other sections corresponds to a storefront on the ground floor. Adornment on the lower floors is minimal, with Gothic tracery between the top floor and roof edge.

The building was constructed in 1912 for the Dunlap Realty Group. It was designed by the local architectural firm of Samuel M. Green, one of the largest commercial architectural firms in New England, which located its offices on the top floor. It is a distinctive local example of the Gothic Revival as applied to commercial architecture.

== See also ==
- Fitzgerald's Stearns Square Block, 300–308 Bridge Street
- National Register of Historic Places listings in Springfield, Massachusetts
- National Register of Historic Places listings in Hampden County, Massachusetts
