= P. James Debney =

P. James Debney (born c. 1968) is the former CEO and president of American Outdoor Brands Corporation, the parent company of firearms manufacturer Smith & Wesson.

Debney was CEO of American Outdoor Brands (previously known as Smith & Wesson Holding Corporation) starting in 2011. In January 2020, Debney was replaced, with the board of directors stating that he had "engaged in conduct inconsistent with a nonfinancial company policy." In late February 2020, a separation agreement showed that Debney would receive a compensation package from American Outdoor Brands worth over $1 million. His total compensation for the fiscal year ending in April 2019 had been $3.8 million.
