= High School of Commerce (Massachusetts) =

School in Massachusetts, United States

Coordinates: 42.1065°N 72.5784°W

- Springfield, Massachusetts; United States

Information
- School type: Public
- School district: Springfield Public Schools
- Grades: 9–12
- Age range: 13–19
- Campus type: Urban
- Colors: Red and White
- Slogan: Home of Scholars and Champions
- Athletics: MIAA
- Accreditation: NEASC

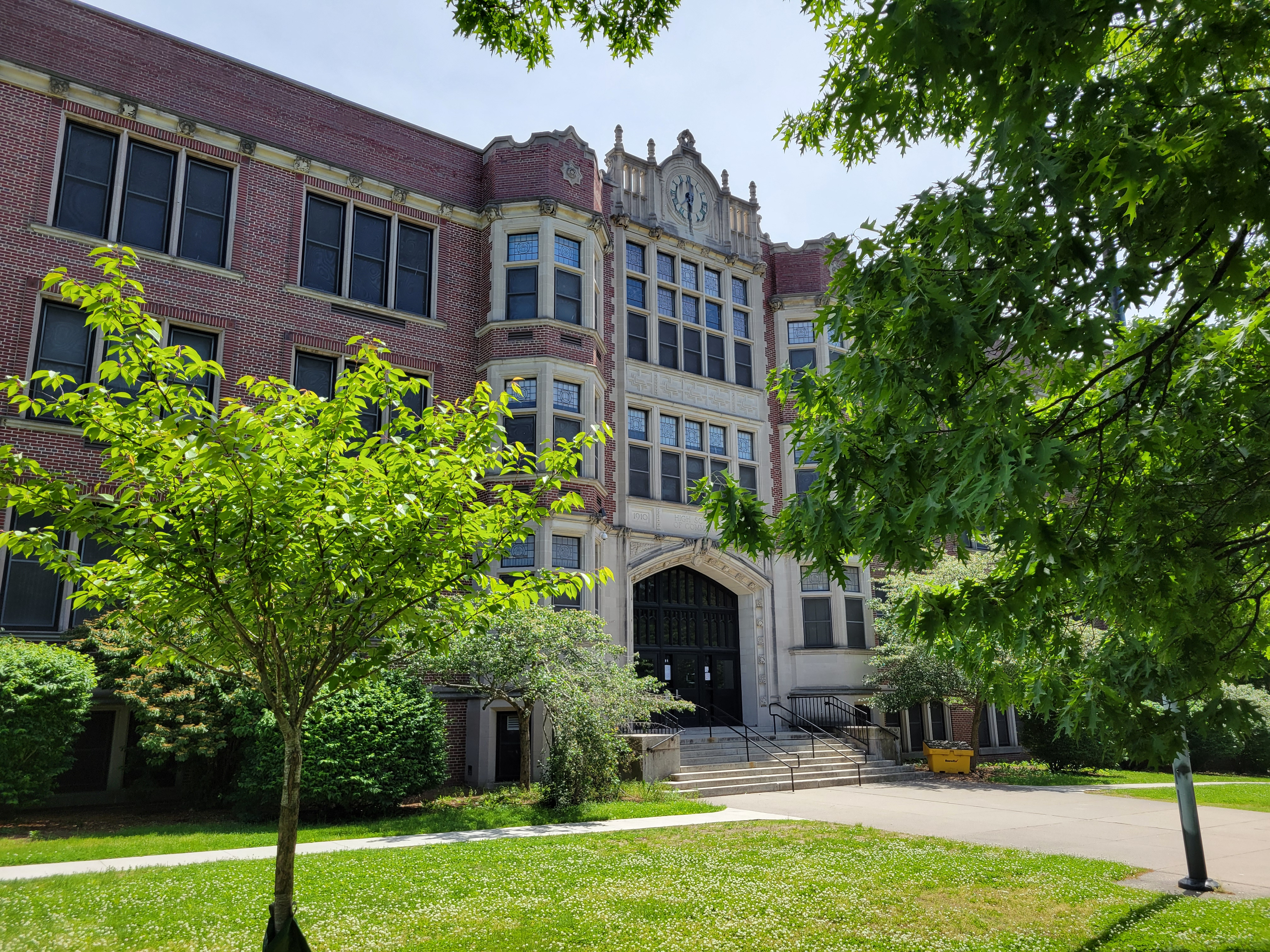
High School of Commerce

High School of Commerce, also known as Springfield High School of Commerce, is a public high school in Springfield, Massachusetts. Enrollment is about 1,400 students. The school is at 415 State Street. It offers an International Baccalaureate program that about 15 percent of students pursue. Minority enrollment is 91 percent. It is one of six high schools in Springfield.

== History ==
The school's graduation rate was 59 percent and it fell below the district and state averages in testing. Of the students who participated in the IB program, 81 percent passed their IB exams. A majority of the student body is Hispanic.

=== Extracurricular activities ===
The school offers an ROTC program.

=== Controversy ===
In 2019 a student was arrested at the school after having words with the officer at the school. Video of the incident contradicted the officer's report that the student walked toward the officer after the comments were made, instead showing the officer approach the student who was walking away.

Long-serving Agawam town clerk, Richard Theroux, became a teacher at the school after stepping down from office. Theroux was also fined $10,000 for violating Conflict of Interest law.

== Alumni ==
- Sijara Eubanks, former mixed martial artist for the UFC
- Will Dawkins, basketball executive and general manager of the Washington Wizards
