= Andrew F. Wissemann =

American bishop

The Right Reverend Andrew Frederick Wissemann D.D.
- Bishop of Western Massachusetts
- Church: Episcopal Church
- Diocese: Western Massachusetts
- Elected: December 1983
- In office: 1984–1992
- Predecessor: Alexander Doig Stewart
- Successor: Robert S. Denig

Orders
- Ordination: December 1953
- Consecration: April 7, 1984 by John Allin

Personal details
- Born: June 9, 1928 New York City, United States
- Died: August 20, 2014 (aged 86) Longmeadow, Massachusetts, United States
- Denomination: Anglican
- Spouse: Nancy Whittemore
- Children: 4

Andrew Frederick Wissemann (June 9, 1928 – August 20, 2014) was the sixth bishop of the Episcopal Diocese of Western Massachusetts 1984 to 1992. He was a graduate of Wesleyan University and Union Theological Seminary, New York.

== Early life and education ==
Wissemann was born on June 9, 1928, in New York City and raised in Hartsdale, New York. He was educated at White Plains High School and Wesleyan University before commencing theological studies at the Union Theological Seminary. He continued his studies at General Theological Seminary and graduated with a Bachelor of Sacred Theology in 1953. That same year he married Nancy Whittemore, daughter of the Bishop of Western Michigan Lewis Bliss Whittemore.

== Ordination ==
Wissemann was ordained deacon on May 31, 1953, and served as curate of Christ Church in Greenwich, Connecticut. He was ordained priest in December 1953. He was appointed rector of Christ Church in Unionville, Connecticut and later rector of St James’ in Greenfield, Massachusetts between 1960 and 1968, and lastly rector of St Stephen's Church in Pittsfield, Massachusetts between 1968 and 1983.

== Bishop ==
Wissemann was elected Bishop of Western Massachusetts in December 1983 and was consecrated on April 7, 1984, with Presiding Bishop John Allin as chief consecrator. He remained in that position until 1992 when he retired. He was well renowned for his pastoral style with which he led the diocese. Wissemann died on August 20, 2014, in Longmeadow, Massachusetts.
