= Christ Church Cathedral (Springfield, Massachusetts) =

Historic church in Massachusetts, United States

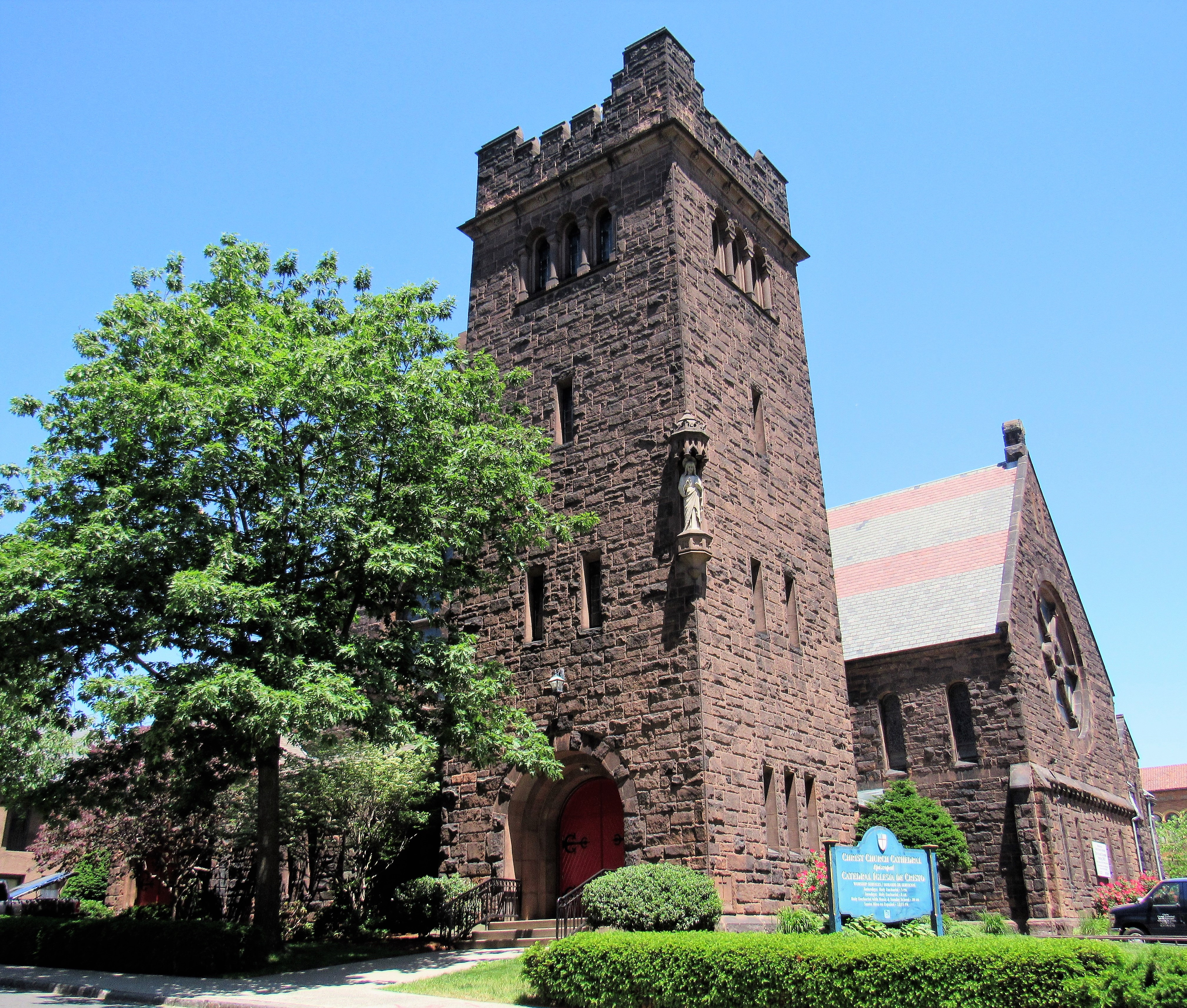

- Location within Massachusetts
- 42°06′12.13″N 72°35′8.95″W
- Location: 35 Chestnut St. Springfield, Massachusetts
- Country: United States
- Denomination: Episcopal Church in the United States of America
- Website: www.cccspfld.org

History
- Founded: May 13, 1817
- Consecrated: May 25, 1894

Architecture
- Architect(s): Lord, Fuller, and Wadlan
- Style: Romanesque Revival
- Groundbreaking: 1874
- Completed: 1876

Specifications
- Materials: Brownstone

Administration
- Diocese: Western Massachusetts

Clergy
- Bishop: Rt. Rev. Miguelina Howell
- Dean: The Very Reverend Jose Reyés
- Christ Church Cathedral
- U.S. Historic district – Contributing property
- Part of: Quadrangle–Mattoon Street Historic District (ID74000371)
- Added to NRHP: May 8, 1974

Christ Church Cathedral is an Episcopal cathedral located in Springfield, Massachusetts, United States. It is the seat of the Diocese of Western Massachusetts. In 1974 the cathedral was included as a contributing property in the Quadrangle–Mattoon Street Historic District, listed on the National Register of Historic Places.

The cathedral reported 585 members in 2023. Plate and pledge income for the congregation in 2025 was $267,751 with average Sunday attendance (ASA) of 111. This was a relative decrease from ASA of 193 persons reported in 2016.

== History ==
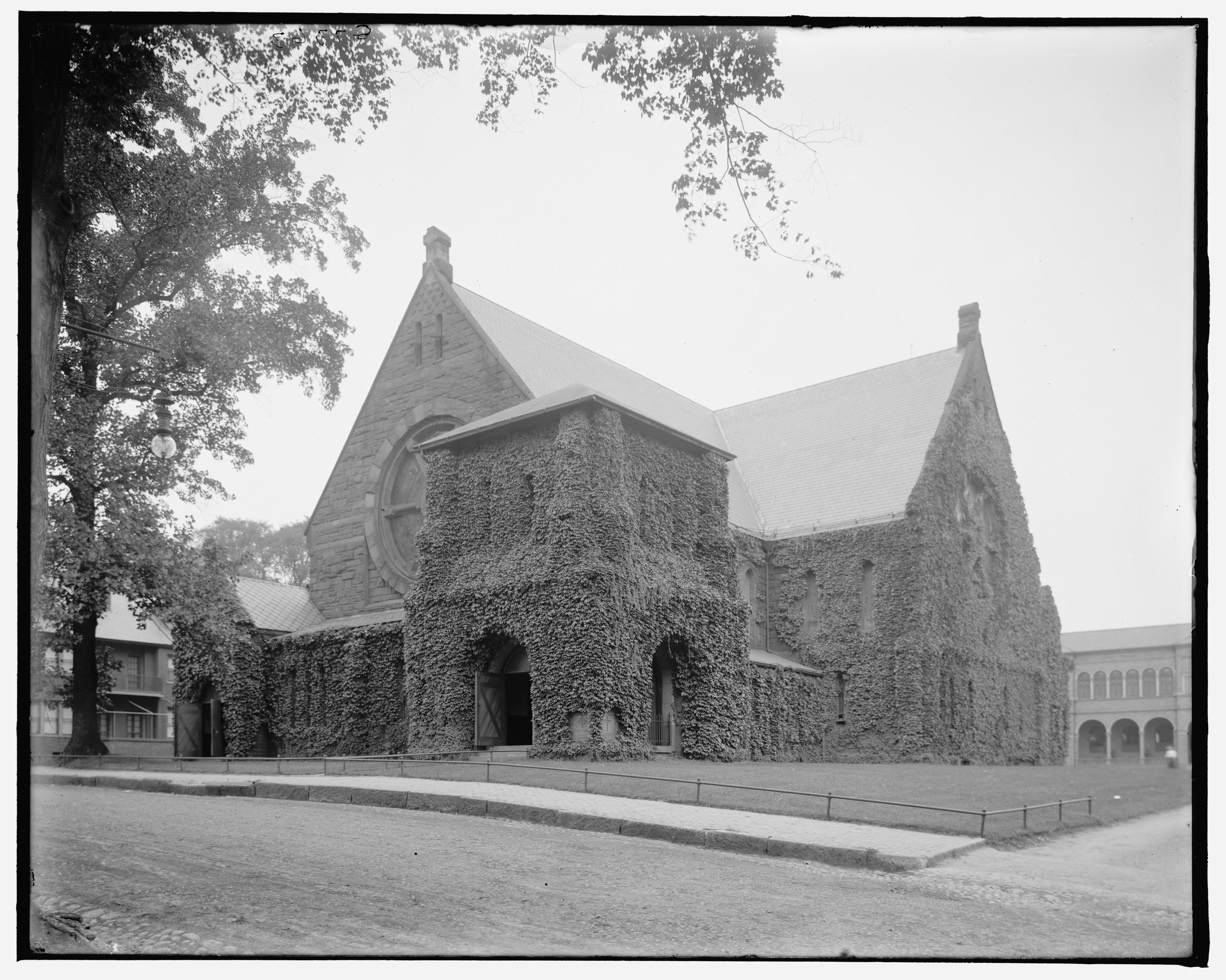
Christ Church Cathedral in the early 20th century

Christ Church began on May 13, 1817, in the chapel of the Springfield Armory under the guidance of the armory's superintendent Colonel Roswell Lee. A fire at the main armory buildings on March 2, 1824, forced the church out, as the space was needed by the armory for other purposes. Services were held at various Springfield locations, including the Methodist church, the parish house of the First Church (Congregationalist), and the old court house. The Rev'd Henry Washington Lee, the son of Col. Lee, took charge of the congregation on October 28, 1838 and it was reorganized. Henry Lee went on to become the first Episcopal Bishop of Iowa in 1854.

Property at the corner of State and Dwight Streets was acquired in 1839 and a new church was built there. Among the names of those parishioners contributing to the building of the new parish church were Anna McNeill Whistler, wife of George Washington Whistler and mother of James Abbott McNeill Whistler, the famous painter. The Whistler family rented Pew No. 9. The new church was a rectangular building with a square turreted cupola. The building was enlarged in 1851 after then rector, Abram Newkirk Littlejohn recognized the need to expand. In addition to more seating, the project added a chancel, vestry room and library. During the same time, a two-manual tracker-action organ (1833) by E and G.G. Hook was purchased from St. John's Church in Providence, RI, by the Ladies' Society for $687.50, with a promise for more. Littlejohn went on to become the first Bishop of Long Island, and in 1895, officiated at the wedding of Consuelo Vanderbilt and the 9th Duke of Marlborough at St. Thomas Church, New York City.

The parish continued to grow and by the 1870s when it was determined a larger church was needed, and the present church was built at a new site on Chestnut Street that was acquired in 1874. Construction began the same year and the first service was held on May 21, 1876. A new Processional Cross and Office Lights (all still in use today) were designed by the famous Henry Vaughan as early works by the now famous architect of the Washington National Cathedral in Washington, D.C., and produced by the famous Gorham company. The tower of the new church cracked early on and had to be removed. It was rebuilt in 1927.

The first convention of the Diocese of Western Massachusetts met at Christ Church on November 19, 1901. On February 7, 1929, Christ Church became the diocesan Cathedral. The Very Rev'd Dr. John M. McGann, who had been rector up to that point, became the first cathedral dean.

The Very Rev'd Jose Reyés, who grew up in Springfield was installed as the cathedral's eighth dean on May 3, 2025. He replaced Interim Dean Bernie Poppe who has served since the previous dean, Tom Callard accepted a call to serve in California.

== See also ==
Media related to Christ Church Cathedral (Springfield, Massachusetts) at Wikimedia Commons

- List of the Episcopal cathedrals of the United States
- List of cathedrals in the United States
