= McKnight Historic District =

Neighborhood in Springfield, Massachusetts, United States

- McKnight District
- U.S. National Register of Historic Places
- U.S. Historic district
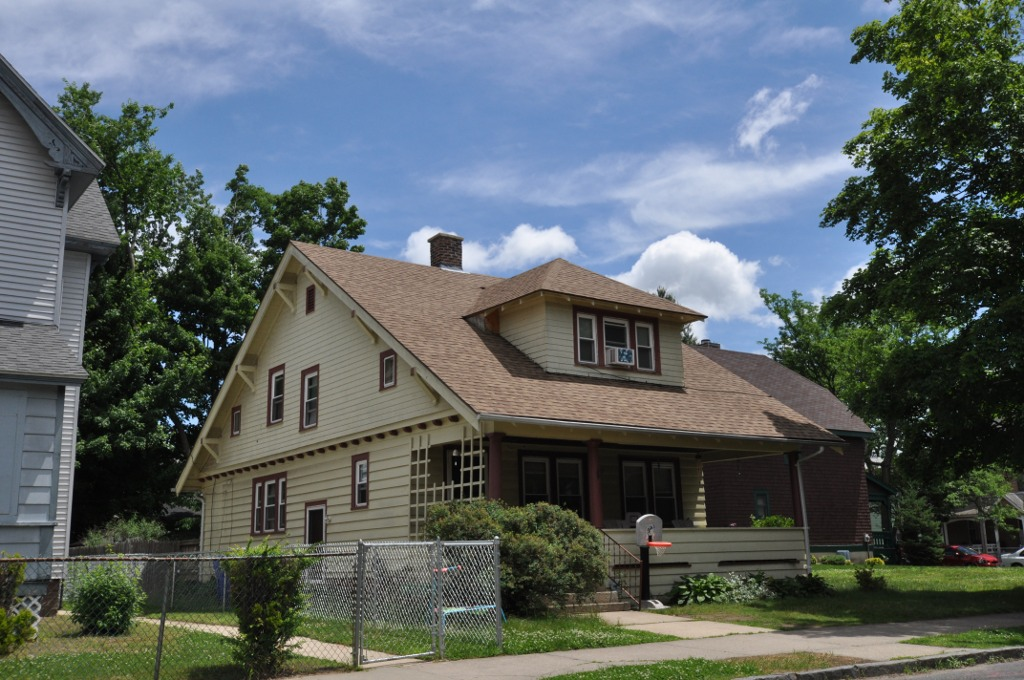
- A Craftsman style house on Amherst Street

- Location within Massachusetts Location within the United States
- Location: Springfield, Massachusetts
- Coordinates: 42°6′52″N 72°34′19″W
- Area: 130 acres (53 ha) (original); 250 acres (100 ha) (after increase)
- Built: 1870
- Architect: McKnight, William; Et al.
- Architectural style: Late 19th And 20th Century Revivals, Late Victorian, Queen Anne
- NRHP reference No.: 76000255 (original); 86002466 (increase)

Significant dates
- Added to NRHP: April 26, 1976
- Boundary increase: September 26, 1986

The McKnight Historic District is a neighborhood of Springfield, Massachusetts, that was one of the first planned residential neighborhoods in the United States. It is one of the city's smallest neighborhoods, at 306.5 acres. It is listed on the National Register of Historic Places.

The area represents a planned residential development covering several hundred acres, which was built in the mid to late 19th century. The architects of the development were John and William McKnight, who, in addition to developing and enforcing construction guidelines in the area, built and landscaped many of the properties. The area was largely built by 1910, and there has been little new construction in the area since. Most of the houses built in the area were constructed in most of the architectural styles that were popular between 1880 and 1990, although there is a predominance of the Queen Anne style. The McKnights began to develop the area, which had previously been mainly farmland, in 1870 with the purchase of a 22 acres (8.9 ha) parcel on which they and a partner built their own homes. They proceeded over the following years to acquire additional parcels of land in the area, plat out roads, and either build houses themselves, or sell plots to other builders. They enforced some uniformity in the area through the use of deed restrictions, which required uniform setback requirements, banned fencing, and required a minimum cost of construction (the latter to prevent the building of inexpensive tenement-style housing).

The neighborhood is roughly defined by the railroad tracks on the north and the Bay Street to the south. On the west it is roughly bounded by Armory and Magazine Streets, and on the east by Monmouth, Clifford, Bay, and Marion Streets. A portion of the neighborhood, encompassing some 130 acres (53 ha) and 350 homes, was designated a historic district and listed on the National Register of Historic Places in 1976. This was expanded in 1986 to 250 acres (100 ha) and 884 properties, encompassing virtually the entirety of the McKnight's development.

== History ==
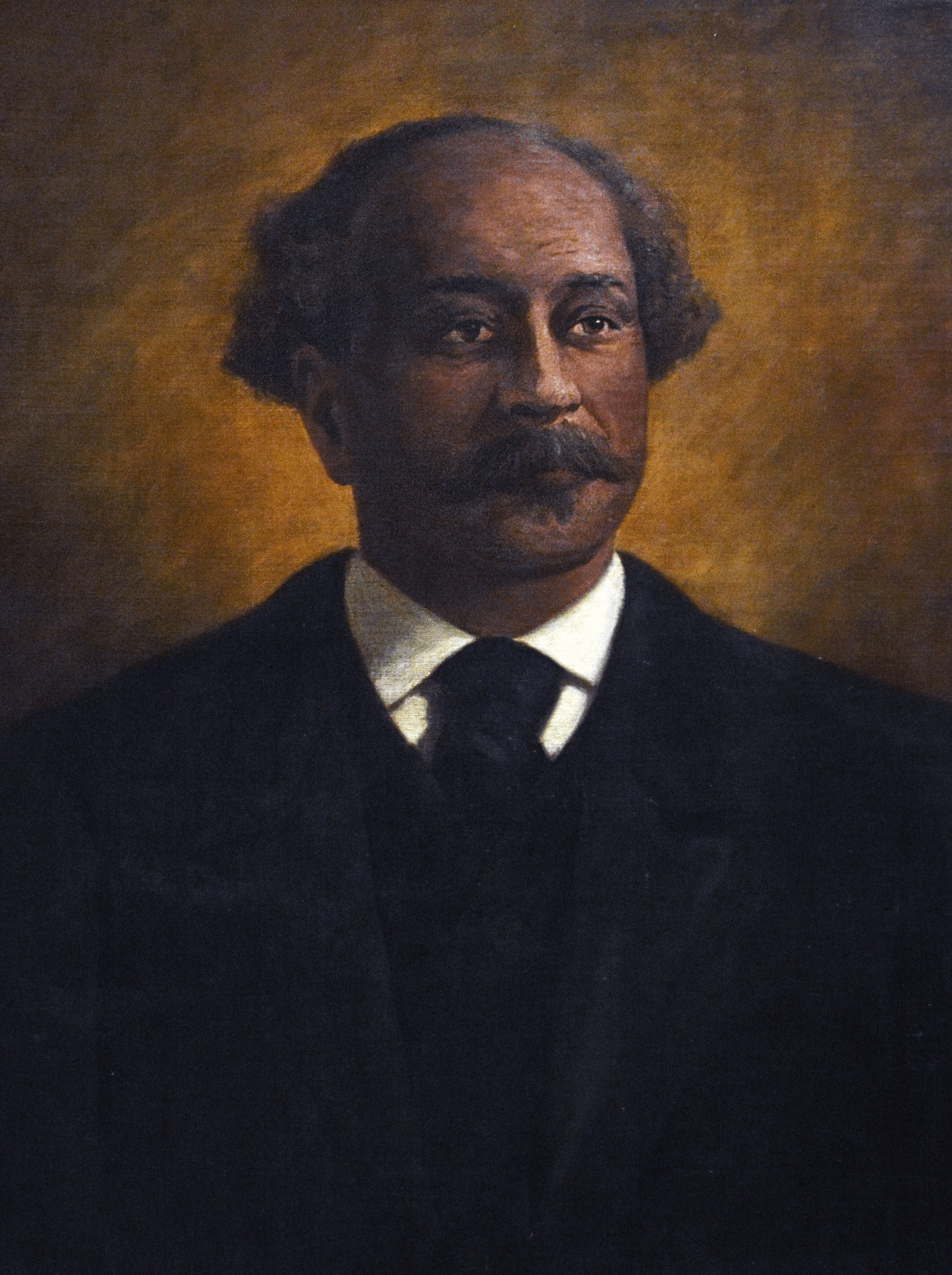
Primus P. Mason donated Mason Square to the city for public use and sold considerable land to the McKnight Brothers, which became their eponymous neighborhood

In 1870, a group of business people led by brothers William and John McKnight planned the McKnight District as a residential community; most of it was constructed between 1870 and 1900. McKnight was built on land originally considered to be "unimprovable pine barrens" when the Springfield Armory and the area around it was laid out in the 1780s.

Economic conditions had changed drastically by 1868 when the horse-drawn streetcars of the Springfield Street Railway first started to run on State Street, to the south of what became the McKnight District.

== Neighborhood ==
McKnight contains Massachusetts' largest array of Victorian houses outside of Greater Boston. The neighborhood's 900 ornate homes are part of a district listed on the National Register of Historic Places. Much of its western half is also a local historic district, the second largest of Springfield's six historic districts.

Several small decorative open spaces were built by the original developers of the community and still grace the neighborhood. These include the "Dingle", or McKnight Glen, the Thompson Triangle, three smaller triangles along Bay Street, and the decorative Dartmouth Terrace leading to the McKnight Glen from Thompson Triangle. To the west of the McKnight Section are the Springfield Armory, a portion of which has been preserved as the Springfield Armory National Historic Site, and the Springfield Technical Community College and Springfield's Downtown. I-291 skirts its northern edge, providing easy access to McKnight.

The district includes the home Herbert Myrick lived in with his family.

== Mason Square ==
Mason Square, named for philanthropist Primus P. Mason and formerly known as Winchester Square after Mayor Charles A. Winchester, is the commercial heart of the McKnight District. It features a branch library, the original Indian Motorcycle Company building, American International College, and a monument to the first-ever basketball game on the game's original site at Springfield College. The area acquired its name from the donation of its land specifically for public use by Mr. Mason, whose fortune stemmed not only from his time as a prospector in California but also from his sale of land to the McKnight Brothers for their developments.

== See also ==
- National Register of Historic Places listings in Springfield, Massachusetts
- National Register of Historic Places listings in Hampden County, Massachusetts
