= American Outdoor Brands =

American manufacturer of outdoor recreation equipment

American Outdoor Brands, Inc.
- Formerly: Smith & Wesson Holding Corporation (2002-2016); American Outdoor Brands Corporation (2016-2020)
- Company type: Public
- Traded as: Nasdaq: AOUT
- Industry: Outdoor Products & Accessories
- Founded: February 18, 1992; 34 years ago Battenfeld Technologies, Inc.
- Headquarters: Columbia, Missouri, United States
- Area served: Worldwide
- Key people: Brian D. Murphy (president & CEO)
- Products: Outdoor Products & Accessories
- Website: aob.com

American Outdoor Brands, Inc. is an American manufacturer of products for both outdoor sports and recreation. The company’s portfolio consists of 18 different brands. Previously among them was Smith & Wesson until the firearm manufacturer was spun off in 2020. A changing political climate influenced this decision. Until 2016 the company was known as Smith & Wesson Holding Corporation, where it was renamed to American Outdoor Brands Corporation. Its headquarters are located in Columbia, Missouri.

== History ==
On May 11, 2001, Saf-T-Hammer Corporation acquired Smith & Wesson Corporation from Tomkins plc for US$15 million. Saf-T-Hammer assumed US$30 million in debt, bringing the total purchase price to US$45 million. Saf-T-Hammer, a manufacturer of firearms locks and other safety products, purchased the company with the intention of incorporating its line of security products into all Smith & Wesson firearms in compliance with the 2000 agreement. On February 15, 2002, the name of the newly formed entity was changed to Smith & Wesson Holding Corporation.

Smith & Wesson Holding Corporation announced in December 2014 that it was paying $130.5 million for Battenfeld Technologies, a Columbia, Missouri-based designer and distributor of hunting and shooting accessories. The company made the acquisition with the eventual intent to merge all its existing Smith & Wesson, M&P and Thompson Center Arms accessories into a single division.

In August 2016, Smith & Wesson Holding Corporation bought Crimson Trace, a laser-sight manufacturer, for $95 million and Taylor Brands, a tool and knife maker, for $85 million. In November of that same year, the company bought UST Brands, a survival equipment maker, for $32.3 million.

The company had diversified from firearms into sporting goods and outdoor gear, the rugged outdoors business being a larger market than firearms, in hopes of insulating Smith & Wesson from the stock price volatility caused by the unpredictability of the gun business. This culminated in the decision to change the company's name, and on November 7, 2016, Smith & Wesson Holding Corporation announced that it would change its name to American Outdoor Brands Corporation. The name change took effect on the first business day of 2017. The change occurred at a time when the firearms industry was receiving backlash over gun violence in America, and so was also seen as an attempt to disassociate itself from the negative repercussions surrounding the issue.

In 2017, firearms accounted for 86% of American Outdoor Brands's revenues, and the company shipped 420,000 long guns. American Outdoor Brands also owns Battenfeld Technologies, Taylor Brands (a knife and tool maker bought in August 2016 for $95 million), and Crimson Trace (an electro-optics business which it bought in August 2016 for $85 million).

On November 13, 2019, American Outdoor Brands Corp. said it would split into two companies: Smith & Wesson Brands, Inc., which would retain gun sales, and American Outdoor Brands, Inc. The transaction was expected to be finalized in the second half of 2020. The company cited changes in political climate and economic, investing and insurance markets.

In January 2020, American Outdoor Brands replaced CEO P. James Debney following allegations of misconduct. The company named Mark Smith and Brian Murphy as joint CEOs.

On 24 August 2020, the company was spun-off from Smith & Wesson, with S&W retaining the original stock ticker SWBI and American Outdoor Brands becoming a new publicly traded company on the NASDAQ as American Outdoor Brands, Inc.

On March 11, 2022, American Outdoor Brands announced that it entered into an agreement to purchase grill brand Grilla Grills.
