= Alexander Doig Stewart =

American bishop

The Right Reverend Alexander Doig Stewart
- Bishop of Western Massachusetts
- Church: Episcopal Church
- Diocese: Western Massachusetts
- In office: 1970–1984
- Predecessor: Robert McConnell Hatch
- Successor: Andrew F. Wissemann

Orders
- Ordination: 1951
- Consecration: September 19, 1970 by John E. Hines

Personal details
- Born: January 27, 1926 Boston, Massachusetts, United States
- Died: August 12, 1999 (aged 73) Springfield, Massachusetts, United States
- Denomination: Anglican
- Parents: Alexander Doig Stewart, Catherine Muir Smith
- Spouse: Laurel Anne Gale (m. June 5, 1953)

Alexander Doig Stewart (January 27, 1926 - August 12, 1999) was bishop of the Episcopal Diocese of Western Massachusetts from 1970 to 1984.

== Education ==
Stewart was born in 1926 in Boston, Massachusetts, the son of Scottish parents, Alexander Doig Stewart and Catherine Muir Smith, who had emigrated from Aberdeen. He studied at the Cambridge Rindge and Latin School and worked for some time in the MIT Acoustics Lab for the Naval Ordnance Laboratory. He then studied at Harvard College and graduated with an honors degree in 1948. He choose to study theology at the Union Theological Seminary in New York City but later transferred his studies to the Episcopal Theological Seminary in Cambridge, Massachusetts.

== Ordination ==
Stewart was ordained deacon in February 1951 and served as assistant at Christ Church in Greenwich, Connecticut. He was ordained priest that same year. In 1952, he worked on an urban ministry at St. Margaret's Church in The Bronx. In 1953, he became rector of St. Mark's Church in Riverside, Rhode Island, where he spent most of his priesthood.

== Bishop ==
Stewart was elected Bishop of Western Massachusetts in 1970. He was consecrated on September 19, 1970. During his time in Western Massachusetts, he founded numerous parishes and established the 1979 Book of Common Prayer as the regular form of worship in the diocese. In 1983, Presiding Bishop John Allin asked him to become Executive for Administration at the Episcopal Church Center, which he accepted. He resigned as Bishop of Western Massachusetts in 1984. In 1987, he became executive vice-president for the Church Pension Group. Stewart retired in 1997 and died on August 12, 1999, in Springfield, Massachusetts, due to complications of pancreatic cancer.
