= Fitzgerald's Stearns Square Block =

- U.S. National Register of Historic Places
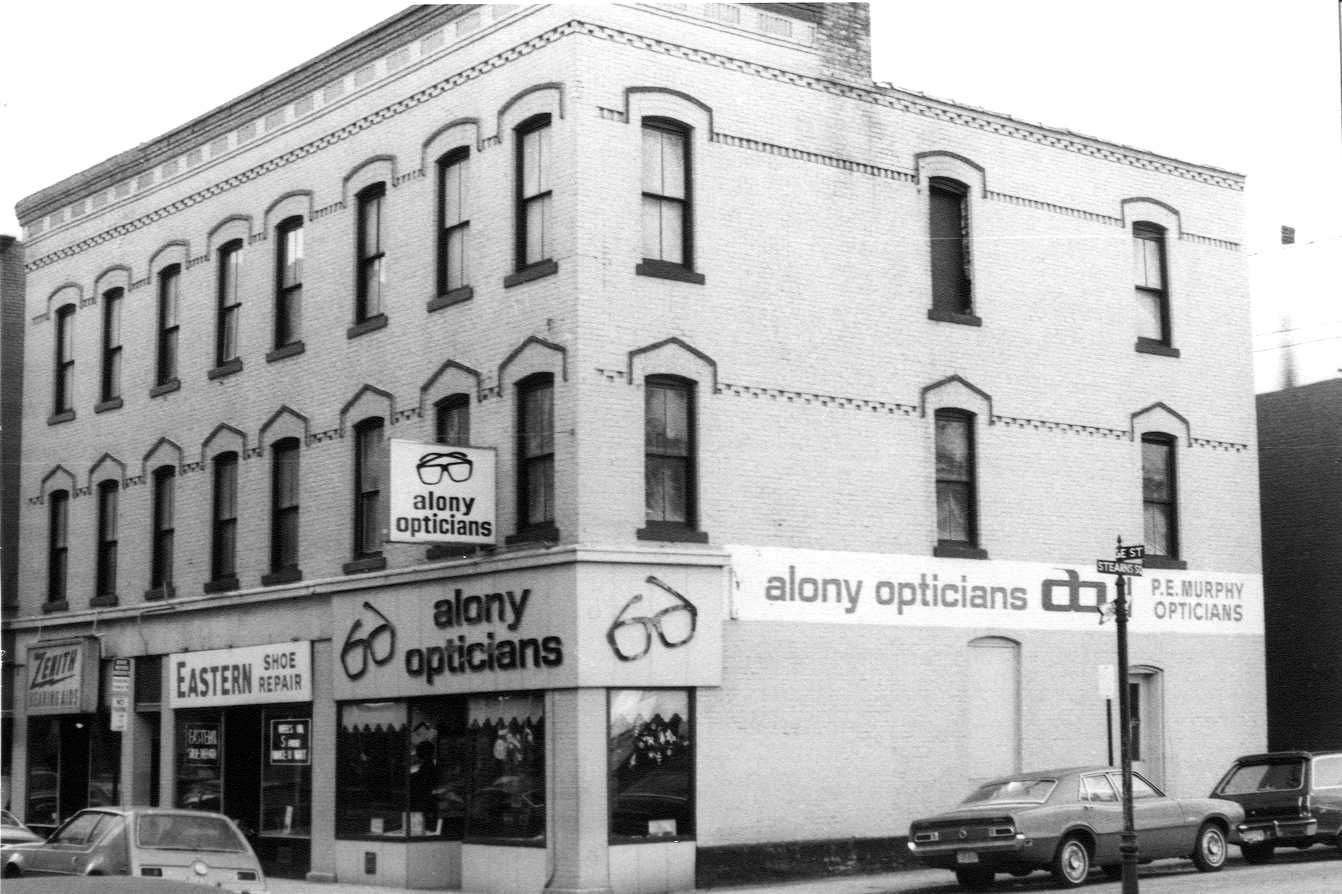
- photo c. 1981

- Location within Massachusetts Location within the United States
- Location: 300–308 Bridge St., Springfield, Massachusetts
- Coordinates: 42°6′15″N 72°35′30″W
- Area: less than one acre
- Built: 1871
- Architect: Perkins & Gardner
- Architectural style: Italianate
- MPS: Downtown Springfield MRA
- NRHP reference No.: 83000747
- Added to NRHP: February 24, 1983

Fitzgerald's Stearns Square Block was a historic commercial block at 300–308 Bridge Street in downtown Springfield, Massachusetts. It was built in 1871 for Patrick Fitzgerald, one of Springfield's leading real estate developers of the time, and is an important early design of Eugene C. Gardner, who later designed a number of prominent Springfield properties. The building was listed on the National Register of Historic Places in 1983. It was apparently demolished sometime afterward; the site is now a parking lot.

== Description and history ==
Fitzgerald's Stearns Square Block was located on at the corner of Stearns Square, a small public park, and Bridge Street, on the north side of Springfield's central business district. It was three stories in height, built out brick, with Italianate styling. The ground floor had two modernized storefronts, while the upper-floor windows were set in segmented-arch openings. The second-floor openings were topped by peaked brickwork surrounds, while those on the third floor had segmented-arch brickwork surrounds.

The block was built by Patrick Fitzgerald, one of Springfield's leading developers of the 1860s and 1870s. Of five commercial buildings he was known to have built, this was the last one to survive. It was typical of early commercial brick buildings constructed in the downtown area, and was one of the earliest known designs of Perkins & Gardner, a leading architectural firm in the city. Its upper floors originally housed residences. It was demolished some time after its listing on the National Register in 1983.

== See also ==
- National Register of Historic Places listings in Springfield, Massachusetts
- National Register of Historic Places listings in Hampden County, Massachusetts
