= Look Park =

Private park in Florence, Northampton, Massachusetts

Coordinates: 42°20′40″N 72°41′20″W

Frank Newhall Look Memorial Park
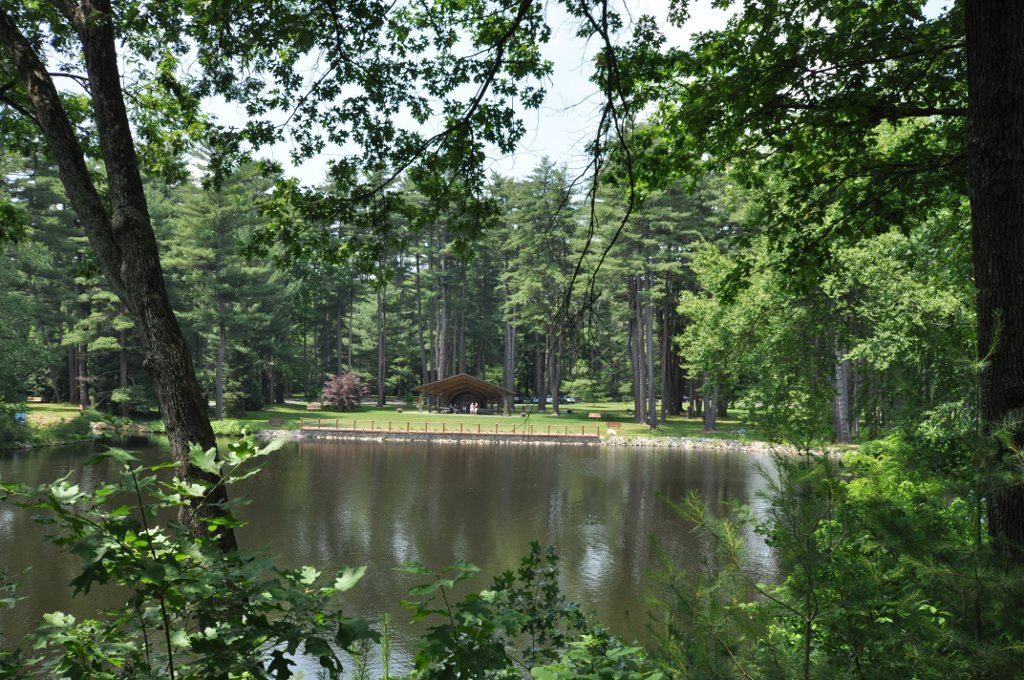
- Look Park in 2013
- Interactive map of Frank Newhall Look Memorial Park
- Type: Private municipal park and natural area
- Location: Northampton, Massachusetts
- Area: 150 acres (61 ha)
- Created: 1930
- Status: Open all year
- Website: lookpark.org

The Frank Newhall Look Memorial Park, commonly referred to as Look Park, is a privately run non-profit park in the village of Florence in Northampton, Massachusetts in Hampshire County. The park is open year-round.

== History ==
Look Park, consisting of about 150 acres (61 ha), was given to the City of Northampton from Mrs. Fannie Burr Look, wife of Frank Newhall Look. In 1928, she gave the city a farm valued at $60,000 and $450,000 for its development and trust fund for its upkeep. Before his death, Frank Newhall Look had been a resident of Northampton and served as the president of the Florence Manufacturing Company. The park was opened to the public in 1930. Operation and maintenance are dependent upon the trust fund, visitor fees, grants, and gifts. Owned by the city but operated as a non-profit organization, Look Park receives no funding from the city or state.

== Amenities ==
The park features walking paths around its perimeter. A section of the Northampton bike path extends into the park. The Mill River runs through the park and small tributaries to it serve as a duck pond. A 15 in (381 mm) gauge miniature railway operates on a 1 mile (1.6 km) track within the park, complete with a tunnel and boarding station. Attractions include a water park, tennis courts, several play structures, paddle boats, a miniature golf course, as well as covered picnic areas and pavilions. Historic covered bridges cross the small streams that run through the park. The center of the park contains a 15-acre (6 ha) playing field with several baseball and softball diamonds.

The Look Park Steamer Train is a miniature train that runs on a 1-mile loop through the park. Rides last approximately 10 minutes. Every Christmas, the Look Park Steamer Train is transformed into Santa's Train and offers rides around the park to view lighted holiday decorations.

The Northampton Recreation Department offers a camp for youth ages 5–12 during the summer, facilitated at Look Park. The Garden House, a banquet hall within the park allows for formal events, weddings, and the popular holiday event known as Santa's Trains at Look Park.

== Christenson Natural Wildlife Center ==
The Christenson Natural Wildlife Center is on the grounds of Look Park. Its animals include fallow deer, peacocks, chickens, pygmy goats, and barred owls.

== Pines Theater ==
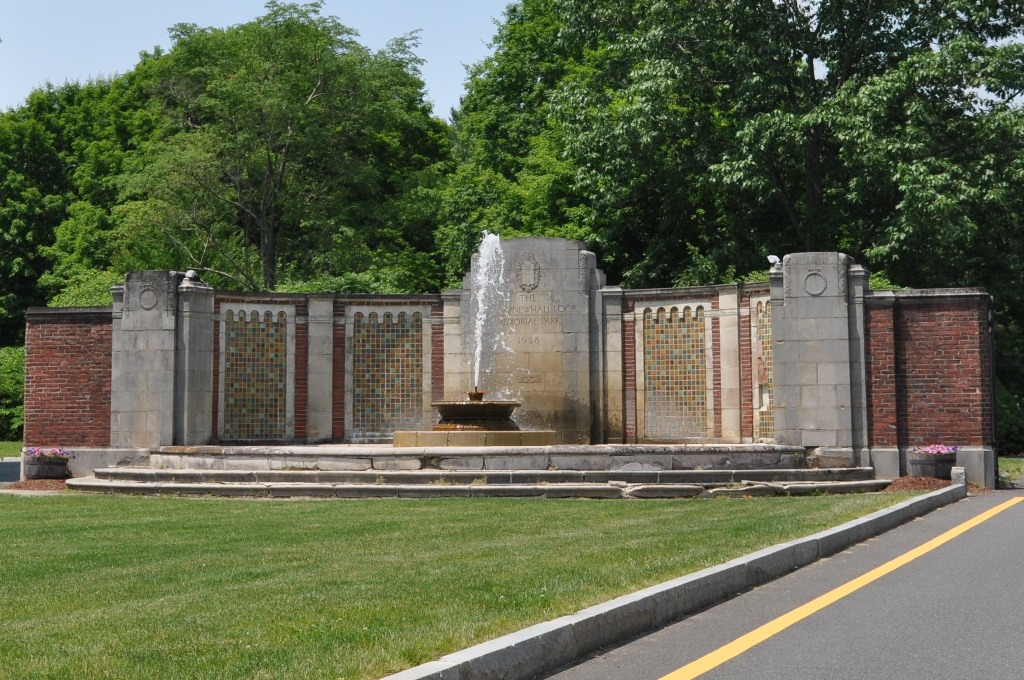
Entrance fountain

The Pines Theater is an outdoor amphitheater located within the park. The stage is built out of Goshen stone, along with the entryway and sound towers. The theater holds the annual "Transperformance" concert, a music festival hosted by The Northampton Arts Council and the Parent Teacher Organizations of the Northampton Public Schools. Famous artists who have performed at the venue include Bob Dylan and Crosby, Stills and Nash. Concerts at the theater were in past years managed by the Iron Horse Entertainment Group, prior to their opening of their own Mountain Park concert venue in 2009.
