= Grove Hill Mansion =

Historic house in Massachusetts, United States

- U.S. National Register of Historic Places
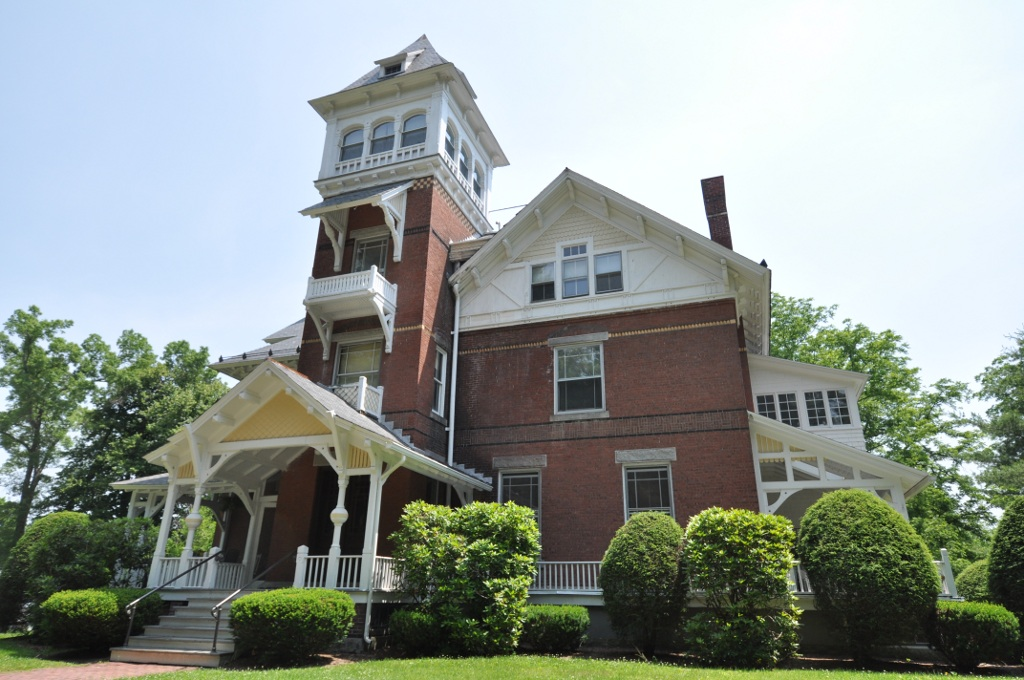
- Grove Hill Mansion in 2013

- Location within Massachusetts Location within the United States
- Location: Northampton, Massachusetts
- Coordinates: 42°21′11″N 72°41′58″W
- Built: 1880
- Architect: Eugene C. Gardner
- NRHP reference No.: 82001910
- Added to NRHP: August 11, 1982

Grove Hill Mansion is an historic mansion at Florence Street and Front Street in Northampton, Massachusetts. The mansion was built in 1880 and added to the National Register of Historic Places in 1982.

== History ==
The large brick residence at the top of Grove Hill in the village of Leeds, Massachusetts (part of Northampton) was built in 1880 for Lucius Dimock, the director of the Nonotuck Silk Company. Not coincidentally, it bears a striking resemblance to the company's factory (now Leeds Village apartments), designed in 1879 by architect Eugene C. Gardner. Gardner, a resident of Ashfield, began his architectural practice in Florence at the age of 22. It is assumed he was a student of the prolific Northampton architect W.F. Pratt. Following the Civil War, Gardner moved to Springfield and maintained a practice there until 1911.

The interior of the Dimock mansion reveals the influence of Charles Locke Eastlake, author of Hints on Household Taste published in 1872. Eastlake emphasized superb craftsmanship and the use of cherry and oak woods which remain unpainted to reveal their natural grain. "The Eastlake staircase, structural ceiling treatments, wainscots, parquet floors, doors with intricate inlays, and a chapel in the attic offer the most spectacular domestic interior to be seen in our area," wrote Karl S. Putnam in 1954. Mr. Putnam, who was the dean of Northampton architects for many years, described Grove Hill in glowing terms in the Northampton Tercentenary History Book.

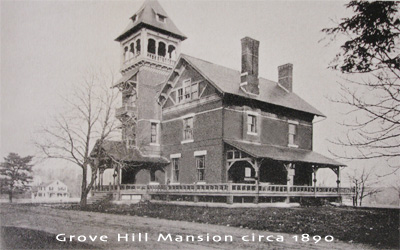
An 1890 photo of the mansion.

The Lucius Dimock home was built on the site of the Benjamin North homestead which was moved 100 yards to the north in 1879. The Grove Hill estate included a large fruit orchard, a greenhouse, and stables for several beautiful driving horses and carriages. A large barn housed Dimock's herd of cows. On the southern boundary was a high English-style stone wall.

Grove Hill was purchased in the 1970s by Samuel Goldman who lived there for several years. In the 1990s, the interior was subdivided into several condominiums. The tower, which is a prominent element on the exterior of the house, remains intact along with the wood bracketed shed roofs. The tower was renovated in 1999, turning the rooftop gazebo into an interior room. The mansion continues to reveal E.C. Gardner's original design.

== See also ==
- National Register of Historic Places listings in Hampshire County, Massachusetts
