= Nonotuck Silk Company =

Coordinates: 42.3696°N 72.7016°W

- Industry: silk
- Founded: 1832
- Founder: Samuel Whitmarsh
- Headquarters: Haydenville, Massachusetts, United States
- Products: silk thread

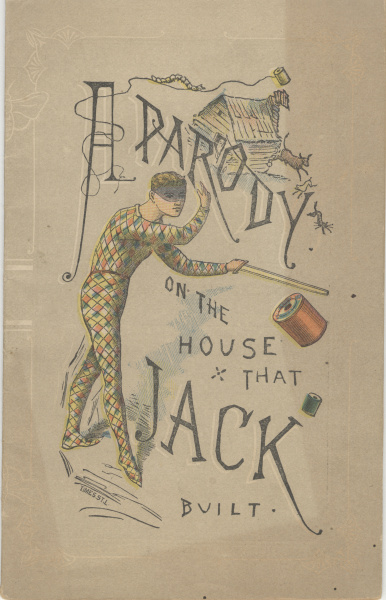
Victorian era trade card for Nonotock silk

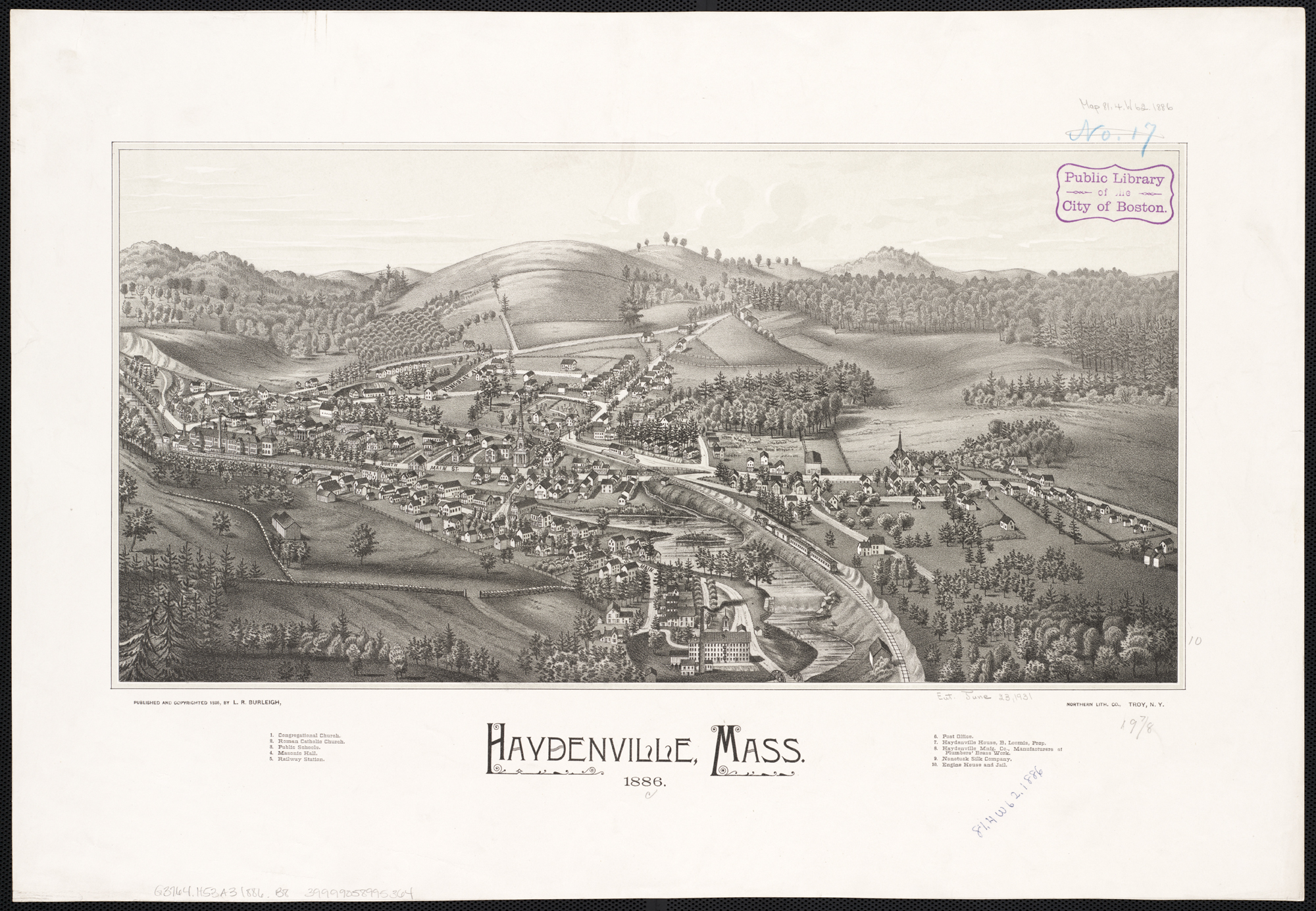
Print of Haydenville, Massachusetts with Nonotuck Silk Company listed as a landmark

Nonotuck Silk Company was a business producing silk thread at a mill in Haydenville, Massachusetts. It was established as the North Hampton Silk Company and operated by members of a utopian society active in abolitionism. The company acquired the Corticelli Silk Mills in Leeds, Massachusetts and became the Corticelli Silk Company. Advertisements included trading cards and a billboard ad campaign on Broadway in New York City. Its name was changed to the Corticelli Silk Company.

== History ==
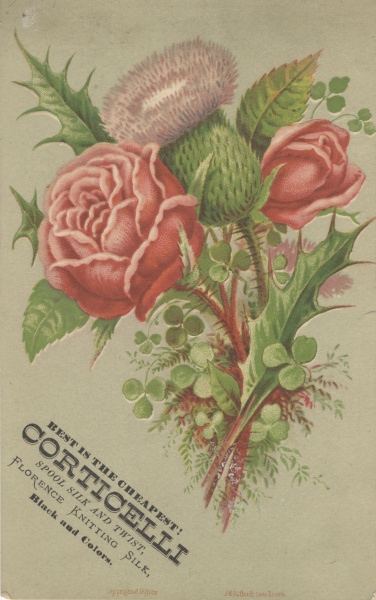
Advertisement for Corticelli silk

In 1832, Samuel Whitmarsh planted 25 acres (10 ha) of mulberry trees in Florence, Massachusetts in order to raise silkworms. Whitmarsh opened a silk mill in nearby Leeds, Massachusetts and it was briefly run as a communal project by the Northampton Association of Education and Industry, a utopian community of abolitionists who believed that the rights of all should be "equal without distinction of sex, color or condition, sect or religion".

Sojourner Truth, a former slave who became a nationally known advocate for equality and justice, was a member of this community (she had moved to Florence in 1843). After the community dissolved in 1846, she bought a house on Park Street, where she lived until 1857. A memorial statue was erected in her honor in Florence in 2002.

The business was Northampton's largest employer for decades.

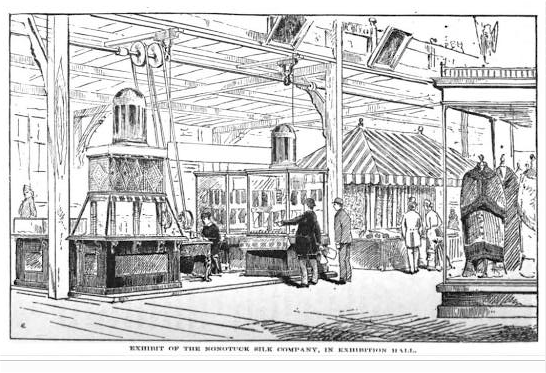
Print of the Nonotuck Silk Company exhibition at the 14th Exhibition of the Massachusetts Charitable Mechanic Association in Boston, Massachusetts September-October 1881

In 1855, Samuel L. Hill, the spiritual leader of the Northampton Association of Education and Industry, invented a machine that could spin silk smooth enough to be used in sewing machines. After the commune dissolved, Hill took over the factory and ran it as the Nonotuck Silk Company. Hill's home at 31-35 Maple Street in Florence served as a stop for the Underground Railway.

The company changed its name again and as the Corticelli Silk Company grew to be one of the world's largest producers of silk thread. The thread was made with raw silk imported from Japan. In New York City, the Corticelli logo—a kitten playing with a spool of thread—loomed over Broadway from a huge electrical sign at 42nd Street between 1910 and 1913. In 1922, the Nonotuck Silk Company and the Brainerd and Armstrong Company merged and ten years later the Corticelli Silk Company merged with the Belding-Hemingway Company. The company went out of business in 1930.

Grove Hill Mansion was built in 1880 for one of the company's directors.

The Smithsonian Museum of American History has a collection of their trade catalogs.

== Gallery ==
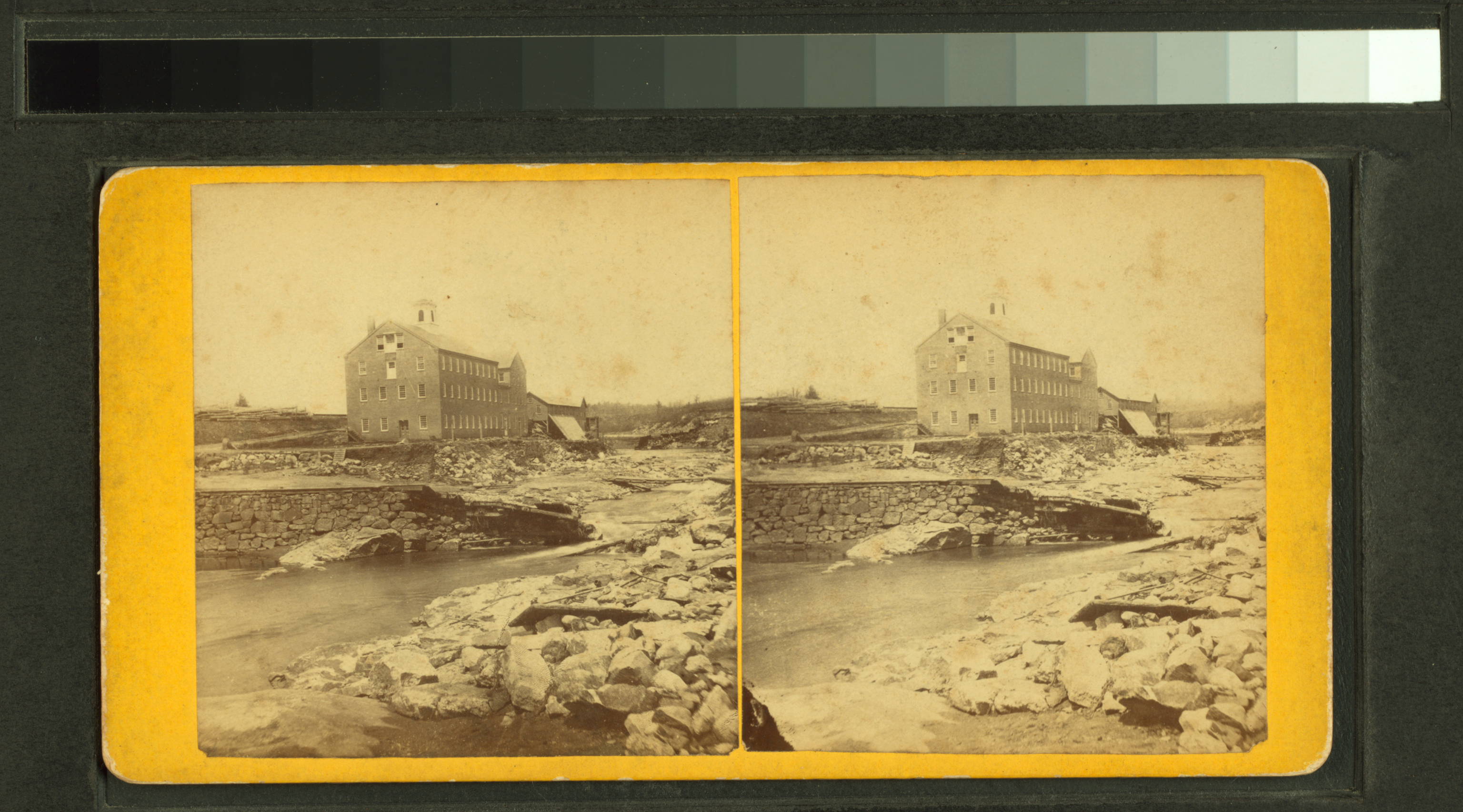
Stereoscopic image from a flipbook of the mill, dam.and ruins after an 1876 flood of the Mills River

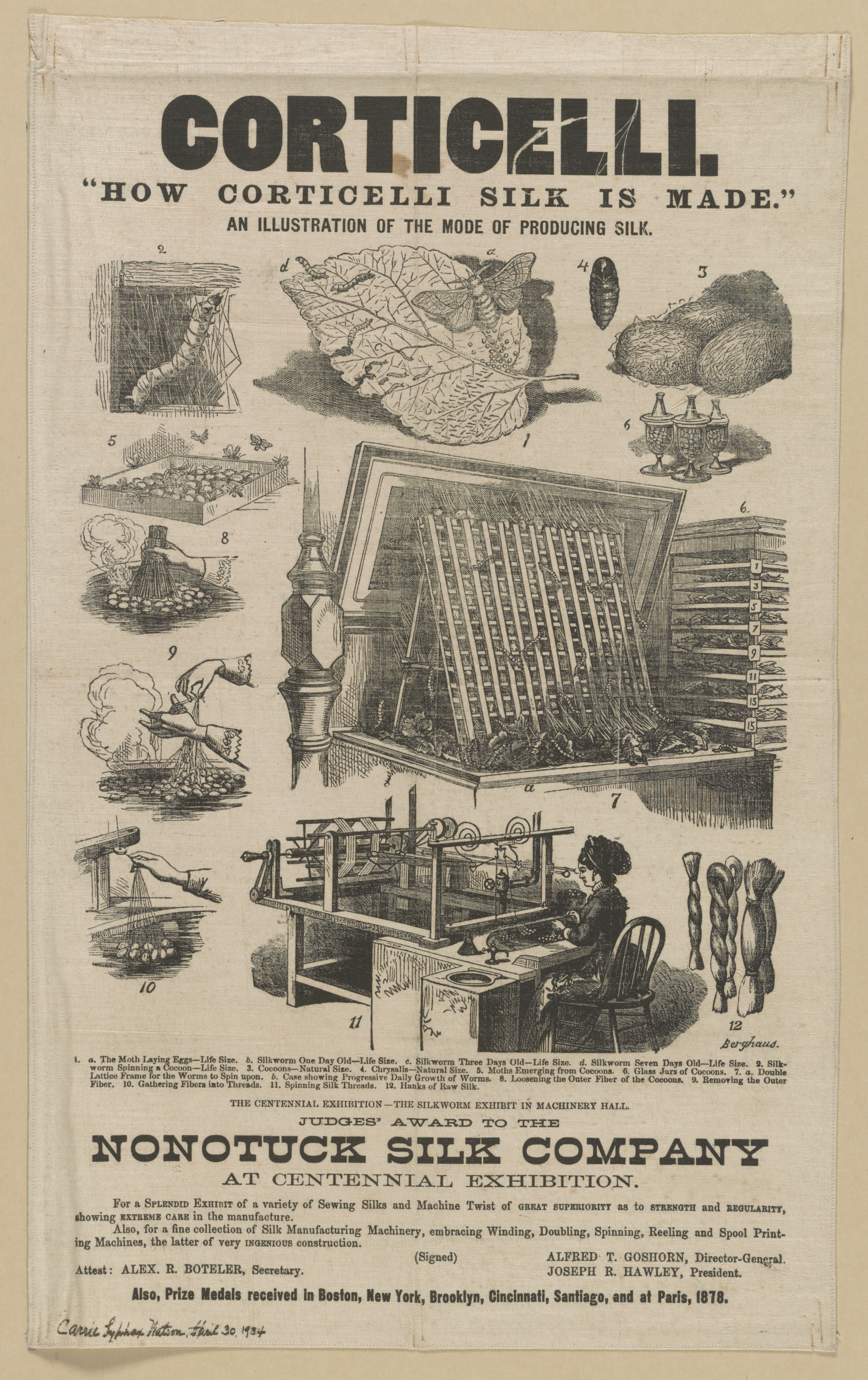
Nonotuck Silk Company advertisement for Corticelli silk showing the stages of silk production

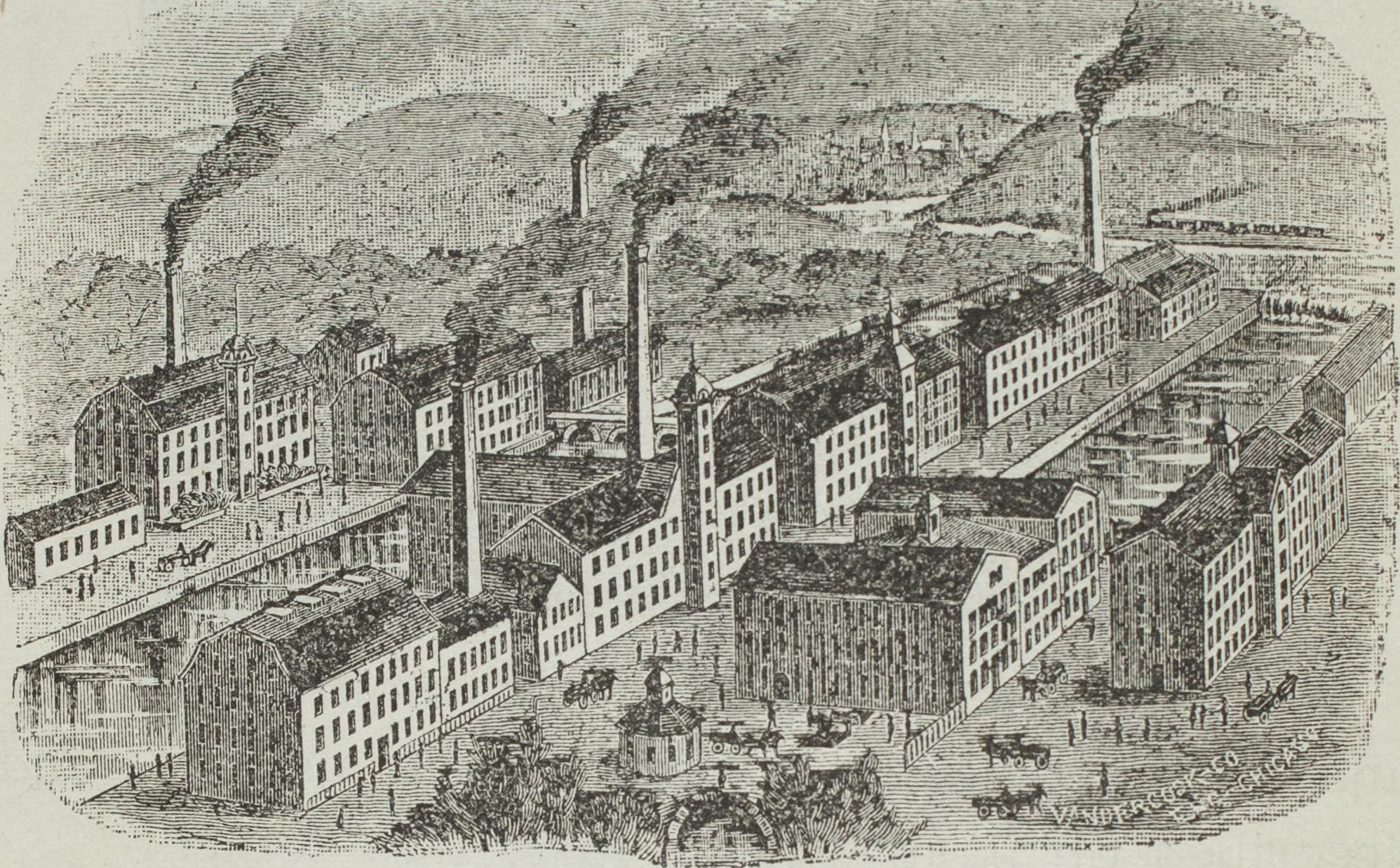
Print of the Nonotuck Silk Company Mills

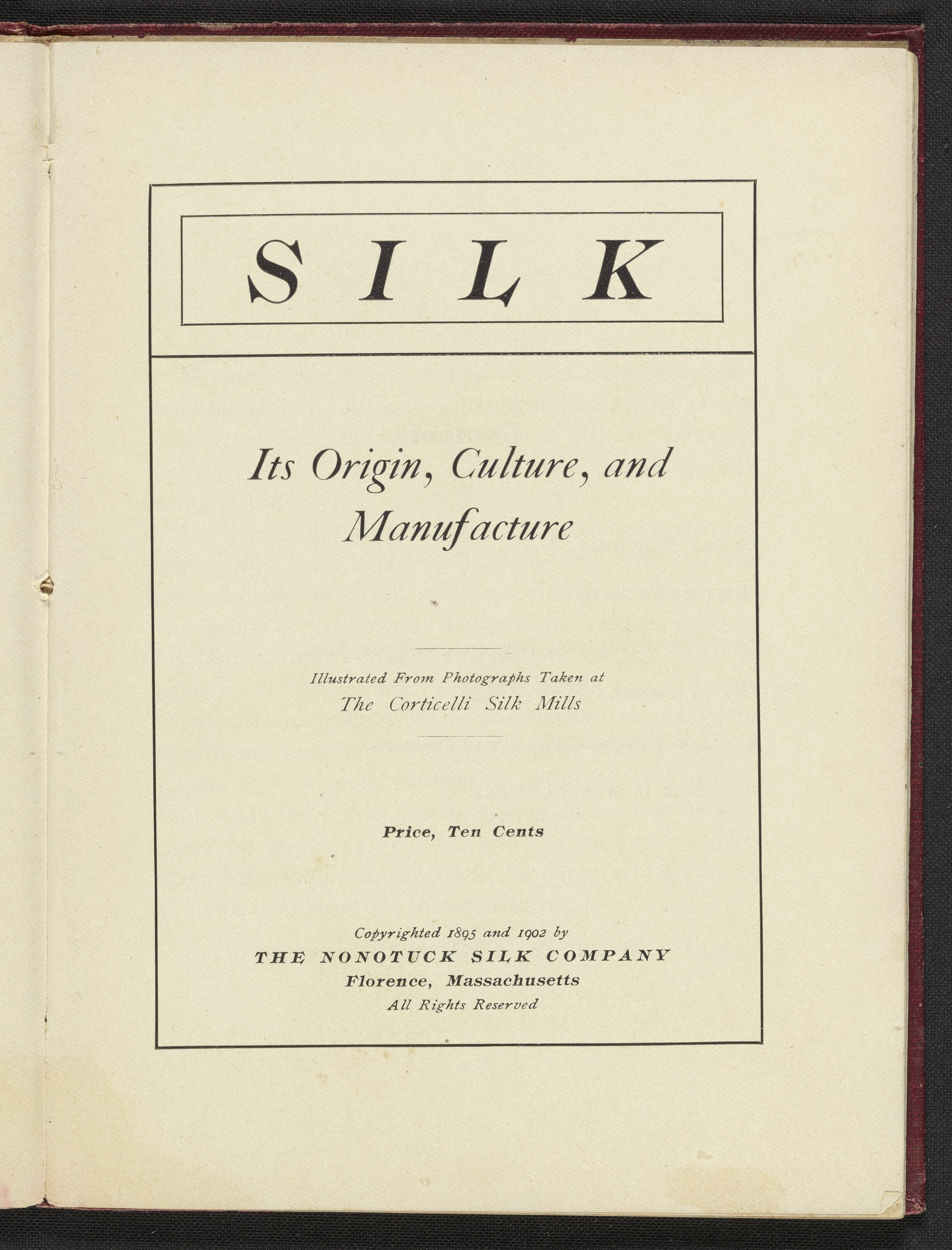
Silk; its Origin, Culture, and Manufacture; Illustrated from Photographs Taken at the Corticelli Silk Mills

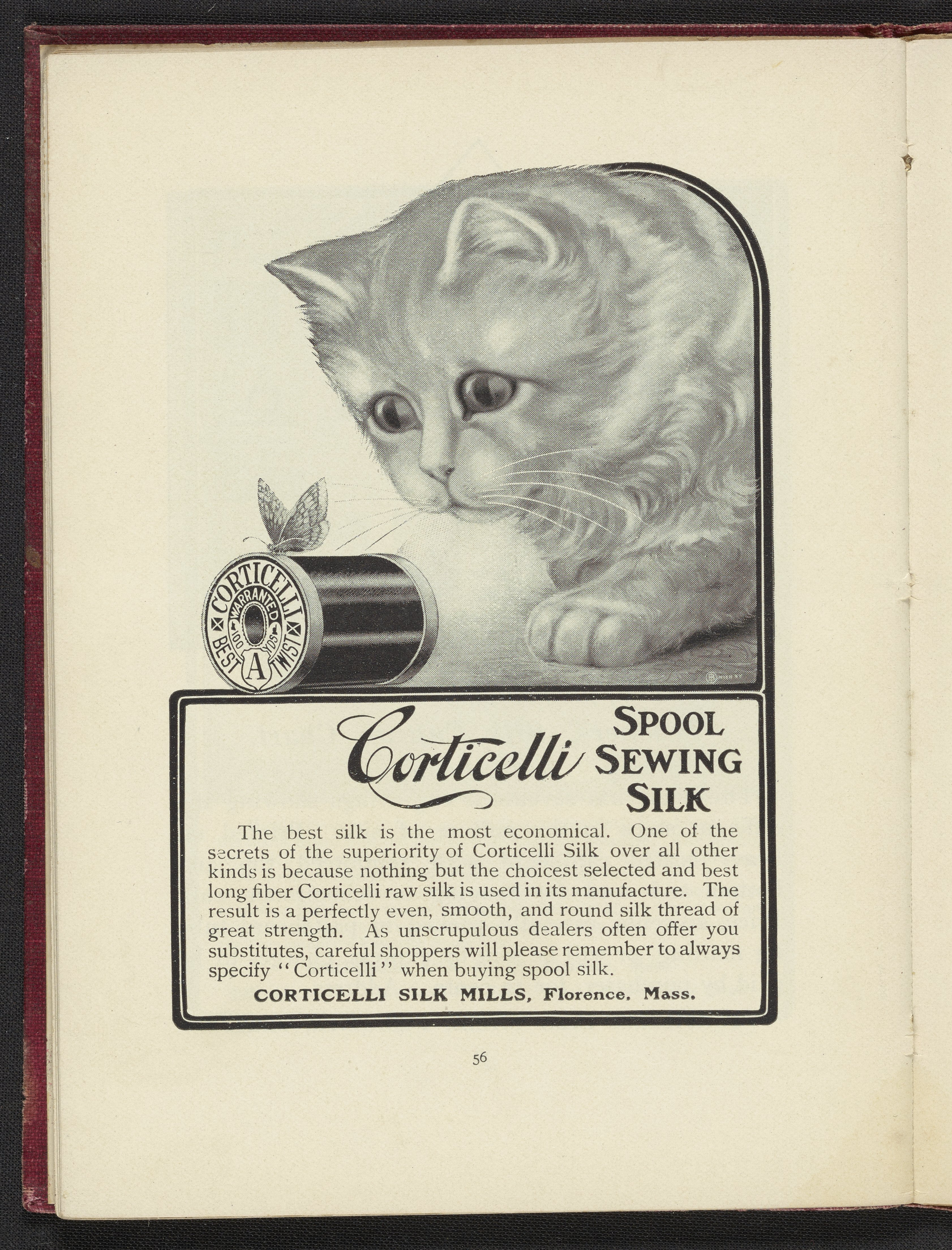
Silk; its Origin, Culture, and Manufacture; Illustrated from Photographs Taken at the Corticelli Silk Mills

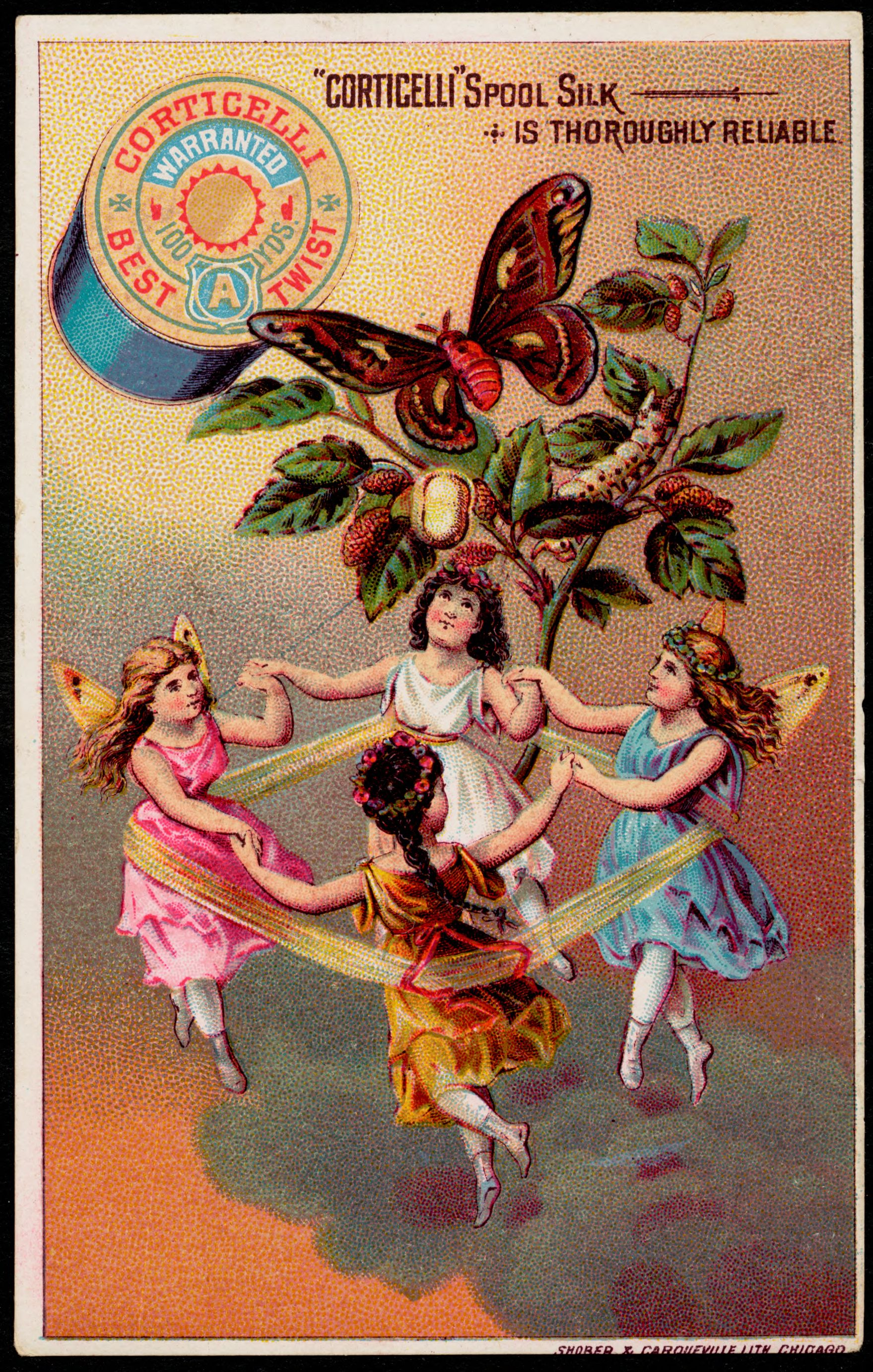
"Corticelli" spool silk is thoroughly reliable, ca. 1870-1900; from the 19th Century American Trade Cards collection of the Boston Public Library

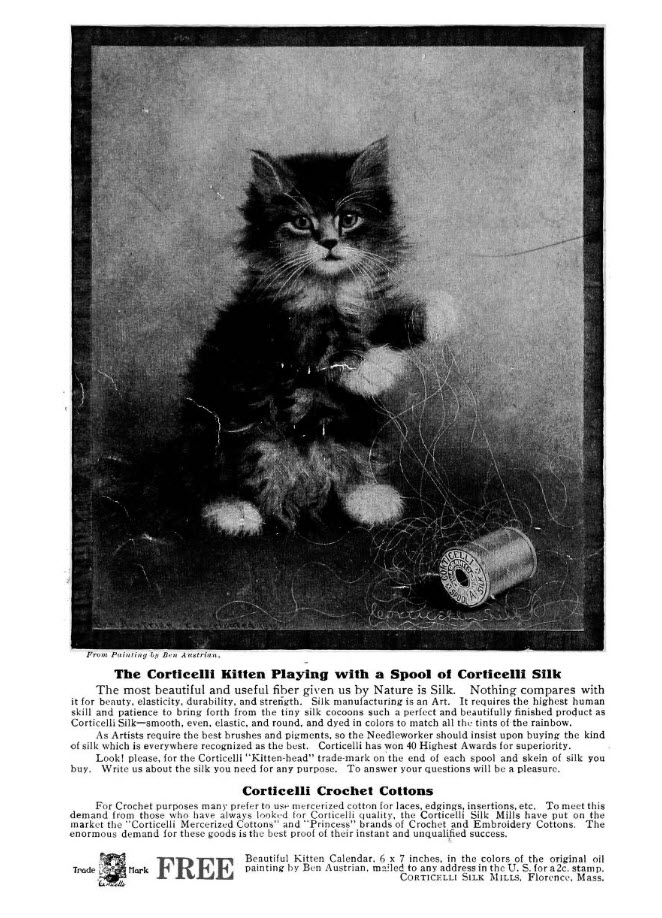
Corticelli Lessons in Tatting book ad for silk thread
