= Williamsburg Center Historic District =

Historic district in Massachusetts, United States

- U.S. National Register of Historic Places
- U.S. Historic district
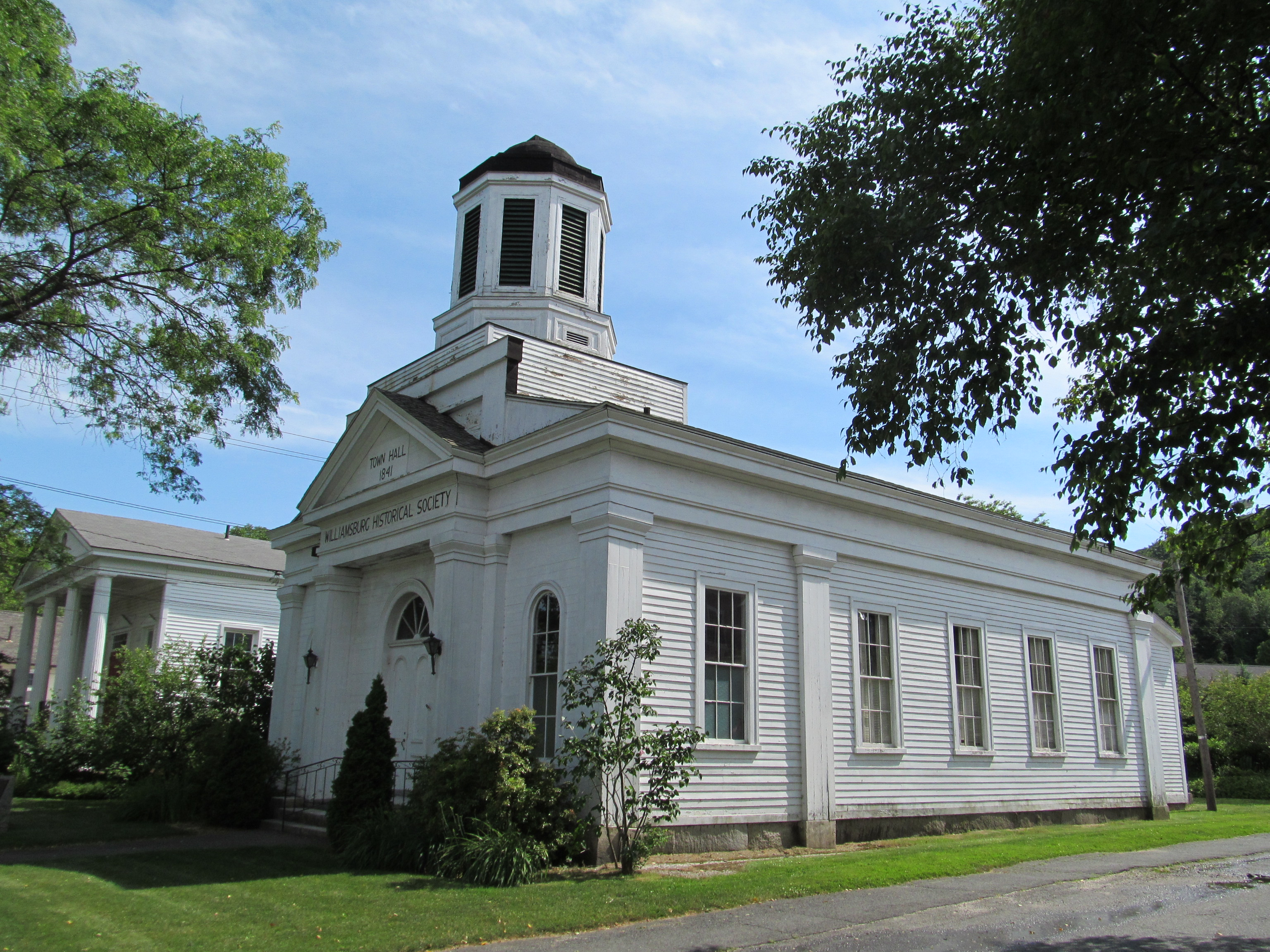
- Williamsburg Historical Society

- Location within Massachusetts Location within the United States
- Location: MA 9, Williamsburg, Massachusetts
- Coordinates: 42°23′32″N 72°43′49″W
- Area: 37 acres (15 ha)
- Built: 1771
- Architect: Multiple
- Architectural style: Greek Revival, Queen Anne, Shingle Style
- NRHP reference No.: 80000506
- Added to NRHP: June 22, 1980

The Williamsburg Center Historic District is a historic district on Massachusetts Route 9 in Williamsburg, Massachusetts. It encompasses the traditional center of the town, which was settled in the 18th century and grew to prosperity in the mid-19th century. It was listed on the National Register of Historic Places in 1980.

== Description and history ==
The Williamsburg Center Historic District is roughly centered where Main Street (MA 9) crosses the Mill River, with a number of local arterial roads radiating away on either side of the river. It extends from Village Hill Avenue in the north to Mill Street in the south, and includes portions of Mill Street, East Main Street, Williams Street, and Buttonshop Road. Buildings in the district include the Meekins Library, a Classical Revival building designed in 1897 by Putnam and Bayley, the former Hampshire Hotel building, built c. 1800 (which also was owned by the local chapter of the Women's Christian Temperance Union), the 1841 former town hall (now home to the local historical society museum), and the 1835 Greek Revival First Congregational Church.

The area now known as Williamsburg was originally partitioned as part of land grants from towns near the Connecticut River in the 17th century, and it was incorporated in 1771 after permanent settlement began in the 1730s. The Mill River was an early site of industrial activity, and the crossing of Main Street was an important local feature, with a stagecoach stop. Early industrial activity in the village included the manufacture of button molds (1826), furniture, and clocks (1830). Waterpowered mills drove the local economy into the 1920s, despite an 1874 flood which destroyed many of the village's buildings.

== See also ==
- Haydenville Historic District
- National Register of Historic Places listings in Hampshire County, Massachusetts
