= Northampton Public Schools, Massachusetts =

School district in Massachusetts, United States

Northampton Public Schools is a school district in Northampton, Massachusetts. As of 2023, the superintendent is Portia Bonner, with the vice superintendent position being held by Anthony Bergstorm.

== Schools ==
=== High school ===
- Northampton High School
  Principal: Benjamin Taglieri
  Associate Principal: Meghan Harrison Diane Zamer

=== Middle school ===
- John F. Kennedy Middle School, Florence
  Principal: Lauren Marien
  Associate Principals: Keddie Loughrey; Vincent Napoli, Jr.

=== Elementary schools ===
- Bridge Street School, Northampton
  Principal: Carol Ruyffelaert
- Jackson Street School, Northampton
  Principal: Lauren Brown
- Robert K. Finn Ryan Road Elementary School, Florence
  Principal: Karen Albano
- Leeds Elementary School, Leeds
  Principal: Christine Wenz

== See also ==
- List of school districts in Massachusetts
