= Mill River (Northampton, Massachusetts) =

Tributary of the Connecticut River in Hampshire County, Massachusetts, USA

Coordinates: 42°23′59″N 72°43′57″W

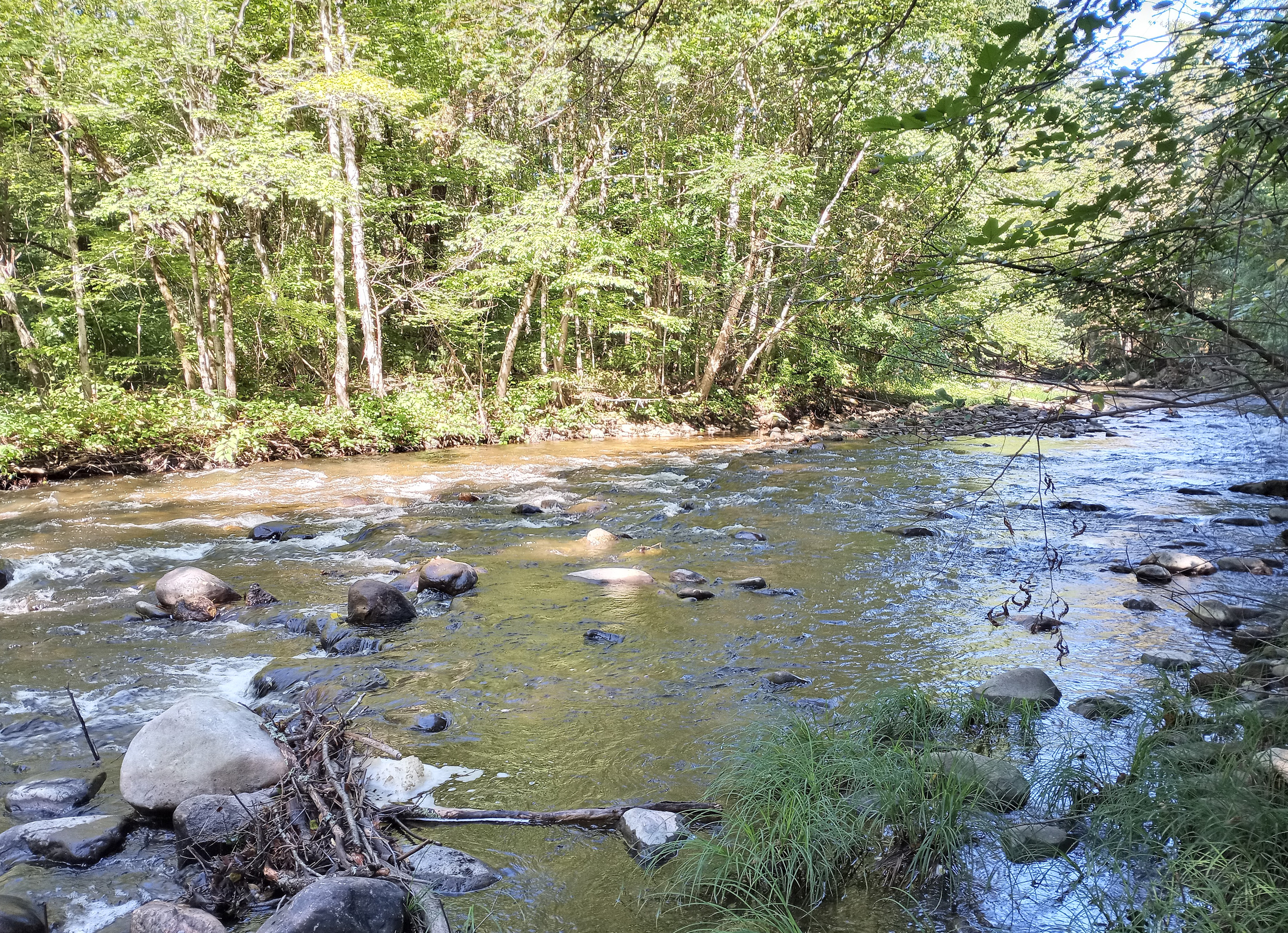
View of the Mill River, 2023

The Mill River is a 13.5-mile-long (21.7 km) tributary of the Connecticut River arising in the western hilltowns of Hampshire County, Massachusetts. It is notable for dropping in elevation, along with its West Branch, more than 700 feet (210 m) over 15 miles (24 km).

== History ==
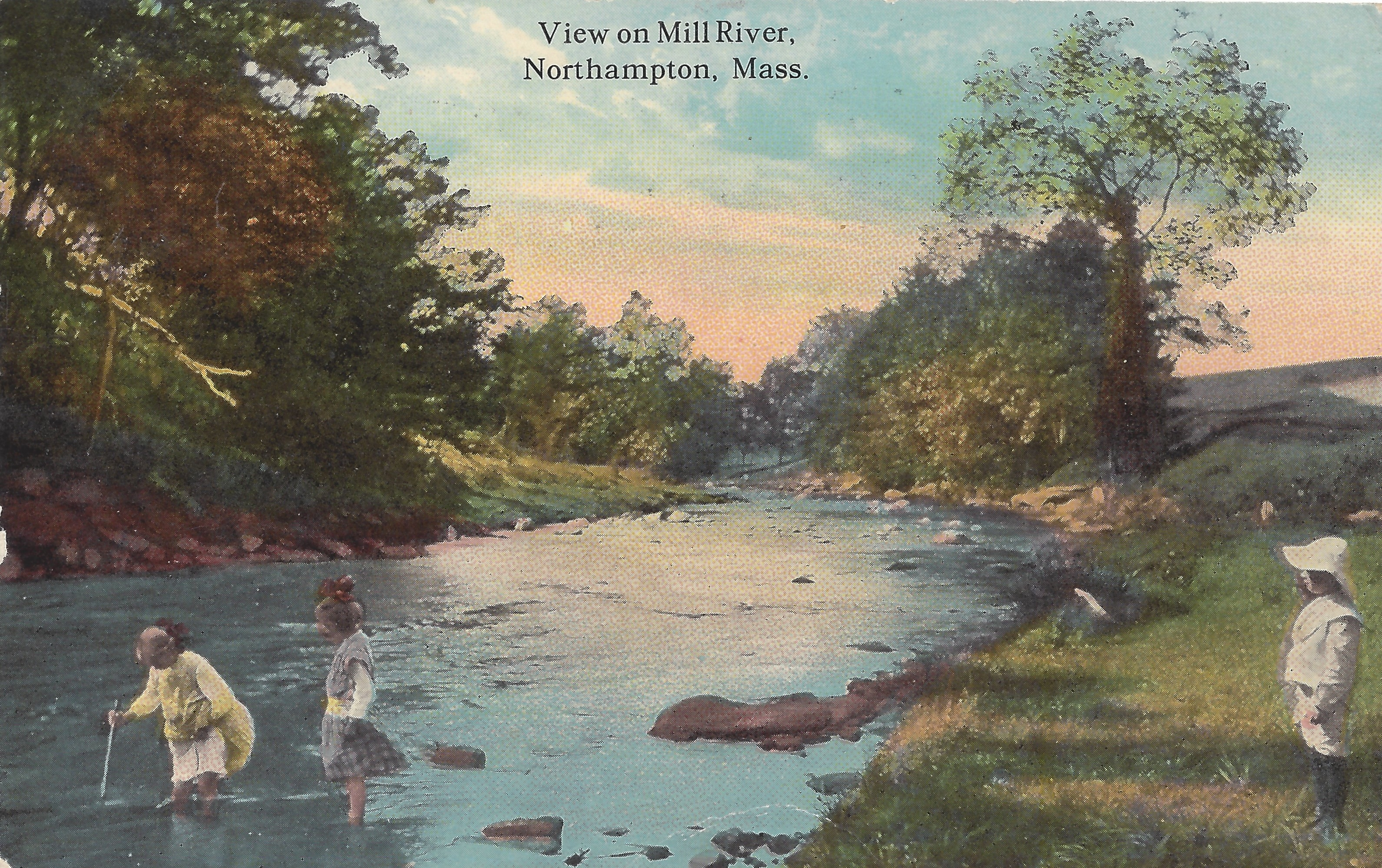
View of the Mill River, circa 1910

Before European settlement, the Mill River was called Cappawonganick by the Nonotuck people. Dozens of mills were built along the Mill River in the early to mid 19th-century to take advantage of the available waterpower. To maintain sufficient summer water flow four reservoirs were built in the higher tributaries of the river.

=== Mill River Flood of 1874 ===
In 1865, a group of mill owners from Williamsburg, Haydenville, Leeds, and Florence constructed a dam on the Mill River north of the town of Williamsburg, using a design drawn by one of the owners, a man with no engineering training. The dam was poorly constructed and leaked as soon as it was filled. On May 16, 1874, the dam failed catastrophically, killing 139 people in the towns to the south. The flood destroyed much of the villages of Williamsburg, Skinnerville, and Haydenville in the town of Williamsburg, and the village of Leeds in the town of Northampton. As high as the death toll was, it would have likely been much higher but for the actions of dam keeper George Cheney, who rode his horse at a gallop to Williamsburg to raise the alarm as the dam began to fail. Other riders took off from Williamsburg and were able to warn residents in towns to the south. Despite an inquest and the clear negligence of the mill owners, no one was punished in court for the disaster. Today, the former site of the Williamsburg Reservoir is accessible by a public hiking trail.

The flood was widely covered in newspapers across the United States, garnering front-page coverage as far away as San Francisco.

=== The Great Flood of 1936 ===
In the two weeks that elapsed between March 9 and March 22, 1936, two record-breaking storms showered the eastern United States in heavy rainfall. From Virginia to Maine, towns and cities in river basins all along the east coast experienced extensive flooding. A survey undertaken by the United States Geographical Survey the following year estimated that between 150 and 200 people were killed as a result of the floods. The same report tallied material damages in the hundreds of thousands. The monumental nature of the 1936 flood, along with another massive flood in 1938, led to the decision to re-divert the Mill River away from downtown Northampton.

==== Causes and regional impact ====
The quantity of rainfall from the storms was described as among the greatest in concentration ever recorded in the country. In New England, the ground was still blanketed from the previous snowfall, and the warmer weather and heavy downpours melted the snow, significantly increasing the volume of floodwaters. Along the Connecticut River, communities were hit by two waves of surges. The first occurred when the Vernon Dam in Vermont gave out, sending an "enormous wall of water" downstream, and prompting the evacuation of Sunderland, Massachusetts. A second occurred when ice jams along the river began to break apart. In Northampton, flooding of the Mill River was compounded by the flooding of the Connecticut River, whose waters allegedly backed up as far as the dam at Paradise Pond by Smith College.

==== Local impact ====
On March 19, 1936, the Daily Hampshire Gazette reported that "Northampton and environs faced the second serious flood within a week as heavy rains began today to swell the Connecticut river and its tributaries to menacing proportions." The Mill River was reported to be rising a foot every hour while the Connecticut River flooded "wide areas of the city and nearby towns." Later that evening, the Mill River had broken past Old South Street, flooding the area around Maple Street and prompting state police to order the evacuation of hundreds of families. On Pleasant Street, floodwaters reached as far as the Plaza Theater at Hampton Avenue, a mere two blocks south of Main Street.

Flooding and damage resulted in highway closures, the suspension of rail and bus service, and impacts to the sewer system, as well as gas and electric services. The Northampton-based Gazette, which reported extensively on the catastrophe, was forced to set up temporary offices at the neighboring Holyoke Transcript, publishing several editions on the Transcript's presses.

Impacts on public utilities and transportation raised concerns about water-borne diseases and other sanitation issues, as well as potential supply shortages. Commissioner of Public Safety Paul G. Kirk prepared for the possibility of food shortages and Mayor Charles L. Dunn issued a cautionary statement saying that persons engaged in "food profiteering" would be prosecuted. On March 21, the Gazette reported that food supplies were being transported by boat through flooded areas. Following the evacuation of local residents, looting of flooded homes quickly became a problem. In response, Mayor Dunn deputized 50 citizens to protect houses in the Maple and Pleasant Street sections of town. The patrol was assigned 20 boats to accomplish the task, and only residents and persons with official business were permitted to be in the area.

==== Response and relief efforts ====
At the national level, President Roosevelt mobilized federal agencies and the American Red Cross to provide immediate aid to impacted areas. He also issued a blanket authorization for the use of WPA workers in flood zones. By March 20, 38,000 families from 11 states had been forced to flee their homes, and the Red Cross was seeking to raise $3 million ($69.6 million in 2025) for the necessary relief fund. According to historian Joseph L. Arnold, "In Massachusetts, where scores of large cities and small towns were pounded by water and huge chunks of ice, 56,000 people sought Red Cross aid." The Hampshire County chapter of the American Red Cross was enlisted to raise $2,000 ($46,403 in 2025) toward the $3 million fund; however, it was soon after determined that the chapter would need "at least three or four thousand dollars over the $2000 quota stipulated by the national Red Cross… because of the acuteness of flood distress in this vicinity." The flood created 3,000 refugees from Hatfield and the lower parts of Northampton. Along with the Red Cross of Hampshire, the American Legion and numerous other organizations and private individuals extended aid to people left homeless by the flood.
