= Ruth V. Hemenway =

American Christian missionary to China

- Born: 1894
- Died: 9 July 1974 (aged 79–80)
- Known for: Medical missionary work, Gender barrier breaking, Social and Biomedical Pluralism

Dr. Ruth V. Hemenway (1894 – 9 July 1974) was an American Christian medical missionary known for her work in China from 1924 to 1941. Despite the limited opportunities available to women in this time period, Hemenway attended medical school and interned at Woman’s Medical College of Pennsylvania. Her own experiences and firm belief in Christianity inspired her to improve the health care for women in Fujian, China. In the midst of political unrest, Hemenway established several clinics and medical facilities in rural China, vastly improving the prenatal care in the area. As Hemenway spent more time in China, observing traditional village life in the decisive years before the Communist Revolution, she began to feel more isolated from her Christian faith. She spent the remainder of her time advocating the implementation of modern knowledge in order to improve Chinese society.

== Early life ==
Hemenway was born in 1894 in Williamsburg, Massachusetts, and was the third of five children to Elijah and Ella Hemenway. Her father owned a farm in the Berkshire Hills. Hemenway’s mother, a teacher, introduced her to many books as a child, which ultimately sparked her intellectual curiosity. By a young age, Hemenway recognized her dream of becoming a physician.

=== Education ===
She graduated from Northampton High School in 1910 and, by teaching at the Williamsburg-Searsville School, was able to save enough money to attend Tufts Medical School. Although Hemenway was raised on New England values and Christian fundamentalism, she became curious about other cultures and religions. By the time she graduated from medical school in 1921, Hemenway had become increasingly interested in the medical needs and practices in China. Once during her junior year, Hemenway visited a church and listened to a Chinese woman’s sermon. Hemenway wrote on the experience, “I learned of whole villages wiped out by pestilence, and whole provinces decimated by flood and famine...I knew I would give my strength and knowledge to medical work in China.” She interned at the Woman’s Medical College of Pennsylvania in Philadelphia and later accepted an appointment form the Methodist Women’s Board of Foreign Missions in 1924 to travel to Minqing, Fujian, China as a Christian missionary.

== Missionary journey ==
Hemenway arrived in Fujian province, China, in the midst of political unrest and turmoil. In 1911, the Manchu Qing dynasty in China collapsed due to the republican revolution, which was led by Sun Yat-sen and the Nationalist party, or the Kuomintang. Years later, Hemenway noted that various political parties, bandits, and emerging leaders were still fighting to take control of the disunified state of China. Although Hemenway spent most of her time in the rural areas of China, she still felt the effects of the changing over of regimes.

=== Northern Expedition ===
After Sun’s alliance with the Communist Party and Chiang Kai-shek’s control over the Nationalists, armies led the “Northern Expedition”, which was a march to Canton that passed over Fukien in the process. Hemenway described this event when she wrote, “We awoke one morning late in June 1929, to the sound of rapid gunfire all around us, screaming in the street, and the quick slamming together of shop fronts. Nurses came running, breathless and frightened,” (113).

Hemenway spent thirteen years in Min Valley, a rural area within Fukien nearby the city of Fuzhou, and lived in Nanjing for a year working as a surgeon in the Methodist hospital. Her time in the countryside significantly altered her religious beliefs and opinions on the medical and political problems in China during this period. After Imperial Japan invaded China in 1937, Hemenway worked in Chongqing until 1941 and then went to Shanghai before leaving for the United States. She studied at the Hague Maternity Center in Jersey City, New Jersey before practicing medicine in Sharon, Pennsylvania. Eventually, Hemenway moved back to Northampton, Massachusetts and adopted four Chinese children. She died on July 9, 1974, at 80 years old.

=== Politics in China ===
Before Hemenway arrived in Fukien, she did not have extensive knowledge of the political happenings in China. However, through her time in the country, she formed strong opinions on the matter. In 1928, Chiang Kai-shek and the Kuomintang unified China with a new central government out of Nanking. Kai-shek introduced China to a series of reforms that sought to protect the country from internal and external forces.

==== New Life Movement ====
Created in 1934, the New Life Movement was a campaign to revive Confucianism in China and implement several educational and financial reforms. Hemenway was a strong supporter of the movement, though she did not realize at the time that it was inspired as opposition to the nation’s growing Communist Party. Her dedication to the policy programs showed when she wrote, “After Christmas 1936, I became interested in the New Life Movement, which the Nationalist government now sponsored. Occasionally I met with Dora Wong, the new chairman of the Woman’s Department of the New Life Movement...it was very exciting to see that people were beginning to sense the need for real reform.” Much of the Nationalist agenda revolved around improving the nation’s cities and promoting modernization. Although she believed that these policies would help with China’s regeneration, she firmly believed that the future of the nation lay in the area’s rural areas, where 80% of the Chinese people lived at the time.

== Missionary work ==
Upon arriving in Minqing in 1924, Hemenway commenced her role as the coordinator of the area’s 100-bed women’s hospital, a position she retained for a total of thirteen years. Under her tutelage, the hospital grew with the addition of new clinics, medical staff, and hospital wings. Additionally, Hemenway created new science initiatives aimed at improving the health outcomes of women, developing aid for expecting mothers, and increasing childcare. The period that Dr. Hemenway spent in China was marked by widespread political instability and various power struggles. Unlike other medical missionaries of her time, Hemenway did not attempt to force her Christian beliefs onto the Chinese people through her work. Conversely, she maintained a perspective that only a strong reliance on traditional Chinese beliefs and values would allow the people to overcome the challenges of such a tumultuous time, an early form of medical or scientific pluralism. She believed that China’s future was in the rural farmers who constituted 80 percent of the population, and her health initiatives were largely aimed at benefitting this segment of the population. She was particularly critical of those missionaries who had attempted to bring change by enforcing an American system of beliefs on the people, remarking, “One mistake of too many Western missionaries to China was the conviction that they bore to the East all the tidings and all the knowledge of a better way of life. Now many of us realize that abilities and defects are equally shared in the midst of our diversities. What is desperately needed between our two nations are bridges of good will. But these must be two-way bridges, with traffic flowing both ways.”

In 1937, following a series of Japanese invasions, Hemenway took a position as the director of obstetrics at a hospital affiliated with Syracuse University in Chongqing, then the Chinese capital. She remained there until her return to the United States on furlough in 1941.

== Return to the United States ==
After Hemenway’s return to the United States in 1941, she experienced a great degree of culture shock stemming from the differences between Eastern and Western ways of life. In her medical journals, she comments on the struggle for a better quality of life among those in China versus the fixation on self-indulgence and complacency found in most Americans. Moreover, Hemenway was troubled by a perceived lack of American concern for those who were struggling in Asia, as she feared that superciliousness had replaced human compassion in the minds of many Americans. She maintained that hardship and destruction, though painful, must be faced by major nations in order to restore equality on an international level, saying “Physical deprivation, hardship, bereavement—these may not be evils but blessings if they initiate constructive change.”

Hemenway spent her first year back in the United States working and studying at the Hague Maternity Center in Jersey City, New Jersey. Despite her desire to resume her missionary work in China, she delayed doing so due to her mother’s deteriorating health, and ultimately received a post at the Christian Hospital in Sharon, Pennsylvania. Hemenway’s watercolor paintings of China achieve local recognition, and she adopted four children from China. Ruth V. Hemenway died at the age of 80 in Northampton, Massachusetts on July 9, 1974.

== Legacy ==
Hemenway was known for breaking gender barriers as well as her medical service. Hemenway’s missionary work was marked by her unique reliance not on American social constructs and religious fervor to affect change, but by a renewal of Chinese traditions to support the people during a time of political upheaval and social unrest. Unlike many other lavish American medical missions to Asia, Hemenway’s efforts lacked significant funding and government sponsorship. Alternatively, she believed that success could be achieved with minimal funding and an emphasis on the communication of new ideas in a way that could be understood by the average citizen, which was particularly advantageous for a smaller-scale effort. Later in life she became known for her watercolors in Pennsylvania and Massachusetts.

Her efforts were also notable in the sense that she was able to overcome the struggles associated with being a woman in medicine during the turn of the twentieth century. Hemenway’s missionary work is marked by an emphasis on improving the quality of life for especially females. Many of her programs in China were aimed at neonatal health or improving the prognoses of women. From her decision to attend Tufts for medical school to her extensive work at the women’s hospital in China, it is evident that her awareness of gender roles in medicine and her efforts to improve women’s leadership and positions within healthcare transcended her time.
