= Haydenville Historic District =

Historic district in Massachusetts, United States

- U.S. National Register of Historic Places
- U.S. Historic district
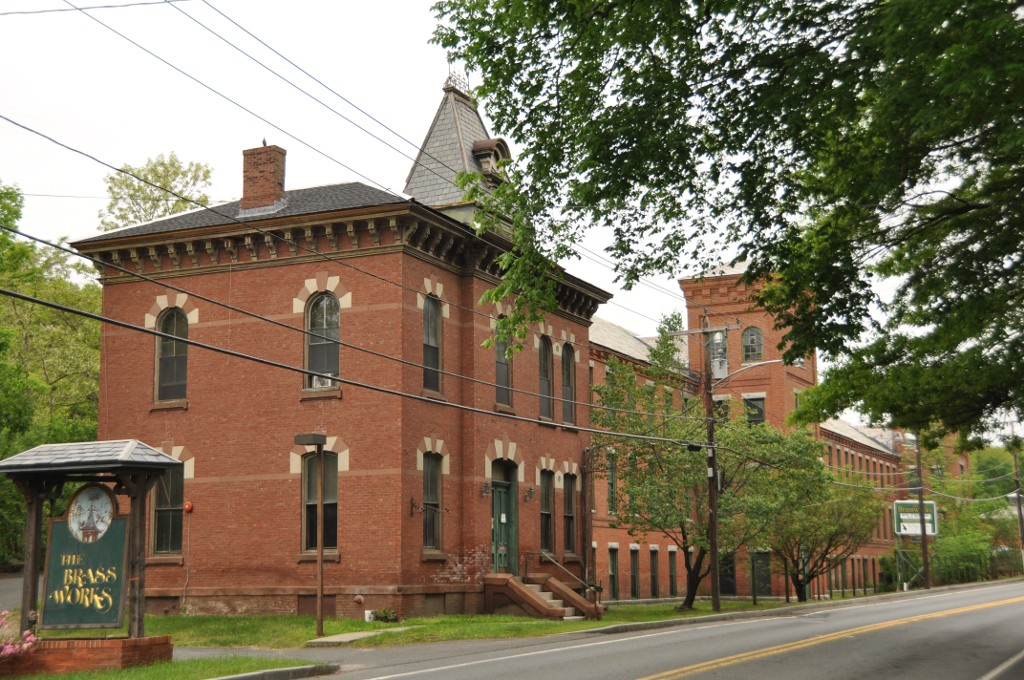
- The old mill building in Haydenville

- Location within Massachusetts Location within the United States
- Location: Main and High Sts., and Kingsley Ave., Williamsburg, Massachusetts
- Coordinates: 42°22′31″N 72°42′9″W
- Area: 35 acres (14 ha)
- Built: 1828
- Architect: Pratt, W.F.
- Architectural style: Greek Revival, Italianate, Gothic Revival
- NRHP reference No.: 76000273
- Added to NRHP: March 26, 1976

The Haydenville Historic District is a historic district encompassing the traditional village of Haydenville in Williamsburg, Massachusetts. It includes properties on Main and High Streets, and Kingsley Avenue. Its most prominent feature is the former Haydenville Manufacturing Company premises, built in 1875 after a flood washed away the previous factory in 1874. This building located on Main Street (Massachusetts Route 9), is now known as the Brass Works, and features elaborate Italianate and Victorian styling. Overlooking the factory across Main Street are two high-style Greek Revival houses, each with four-column Greek temple porticos, built for the brothers Joel and Josiah Hayden, for whose family the village is named.

The Haydens were the primary civic and economic force in the village. David and Daniel Hayden, uncles to Joel and Josiah, first entered into business here in 1808, manufacturing power looms and a variety of small metal objects. The latter came to dominate their business under Joel and Josiah, who established a business that survived until 1950. The Hayden family's influence in the village is visible in the 1852 Haydenville Congregational Church, and the 1900 library, both built with family funds, and in the row of high-quality worker housing lining High Street. The Haydenville Cemetery, also located on High Street, was established by the brothers in 1847 after their father died, and is where the family plot is located.

The district was listed on the National Register of Historic Places in 1976.

== See also ==
- Williamsburg Center Historic District
- National Register of Historic Places listings in Hampshire County, Massachusetts
