= Leeds, Massachusetts =

Village in Massachusetts, United States

Coordinates: 42°21′05″N 72°41′58″W

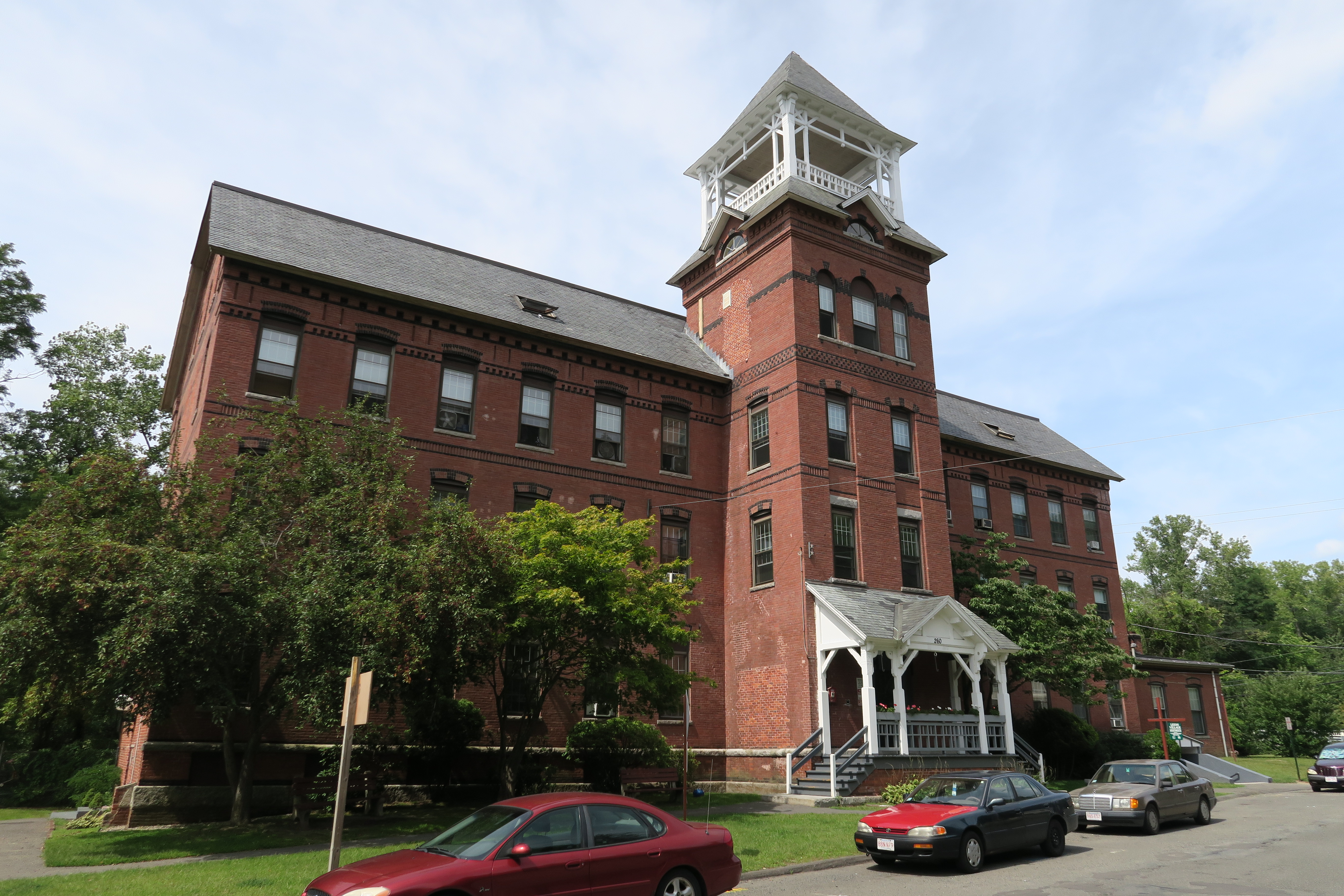
Leeds Village Apartments

Leeds is a village in the western portion of the city of Northampton, Massachusetts, United States, bordering Williamsburg—along the Mill River—and Florence. The ZIP Code for Leeds is 01053.

== History ==
The village was named after the city of Leeds, in England. In the 19th century, Leeds was known for its textile manufacturing, including broadcloth, silk, and vegetable ivory buttons, as well as extensive manufacturing of farm implements and household goods.

In 1874, a dam on the Mill River broke, flooding Leeds and Williamsburg and killing 139 people.

== Geography ==
The major producer of silk in Leeds was the Corticelli Silk Mills, which were owned by the Nonotuck Silk Company. They had several buildings along sections of the Mill River. The major factory was located at the corner of Main Street and Mulberry Street, another factory building was located across the bridge and to the right of Chartpak. Another building was located near the opposite end of Main Street, where the cocoons were steamed to loosen the fibers and made the raw silk usable for production in Corticelli's various products. The company also created items that could be used in the classroom as teaching aids, including a poster showing the various steps in the production of silk.

Today, Leeds is home to the Northampton Veterans Affairs Medical Center, and Chartpak, manufacturer of art and graphics supplies, which includes Koh-i-Noor Hardtmuth.

Leeds is also home to Leeds Elementary School.
