= Williamsburg, Massachusetts =

- Town
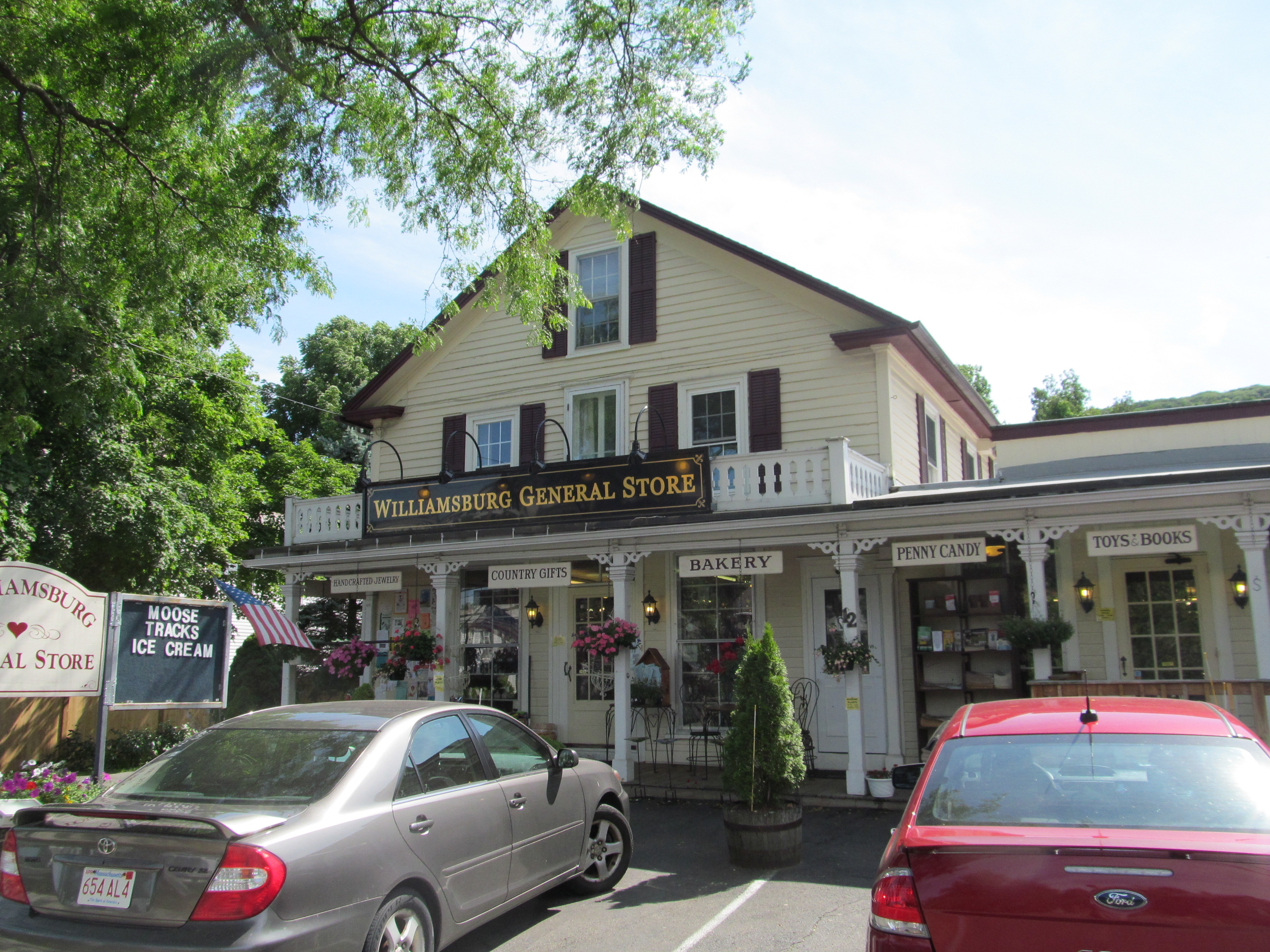
- Williamsburg General Store

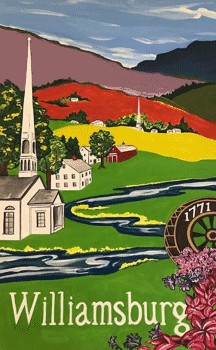
- Flag Seal
- Nickname: Burgy
- Location in Hampshire County in Massachusetts
- Coordinates: 42°23′35″N 72°43′50″W
- Country: United States
- State: Massachusetts
- County: Hampshire
- Settled: 1735
- Incorporated: 1771

Government
  - Type: Open town meeting

Area
  - Total: 25.7 sq mi (66.6 km^{2})
  - Land: 25.6 sq mi (66.2 km^{2})
  - Water: 0.15 sq mi (0.4 km^{2})
- Elevation: 531 ft (162 m)

Population (2020)
  - Total: 2,504
  - Density: 98.0/sq mi (37.8/km^{2})
- Time zone: UTC-5 (Eastern)
  - Summer (DST): UTC-4 (Eastern)
- ZIP Codes: 01039 (Haydenville); 01096 (Williamsburg)
- Area code: 413
- FIPS code: 25-79915
- GNIS feature ID: 0618211
- Website: www.burgy.org

Williamsburg is a town in Hampshire County, Massachusetts, United States. The population was 2,504 at the 2020 census. It is part of the Springfield, Massachusetts Metropolitan Statistical Area.

== History ==
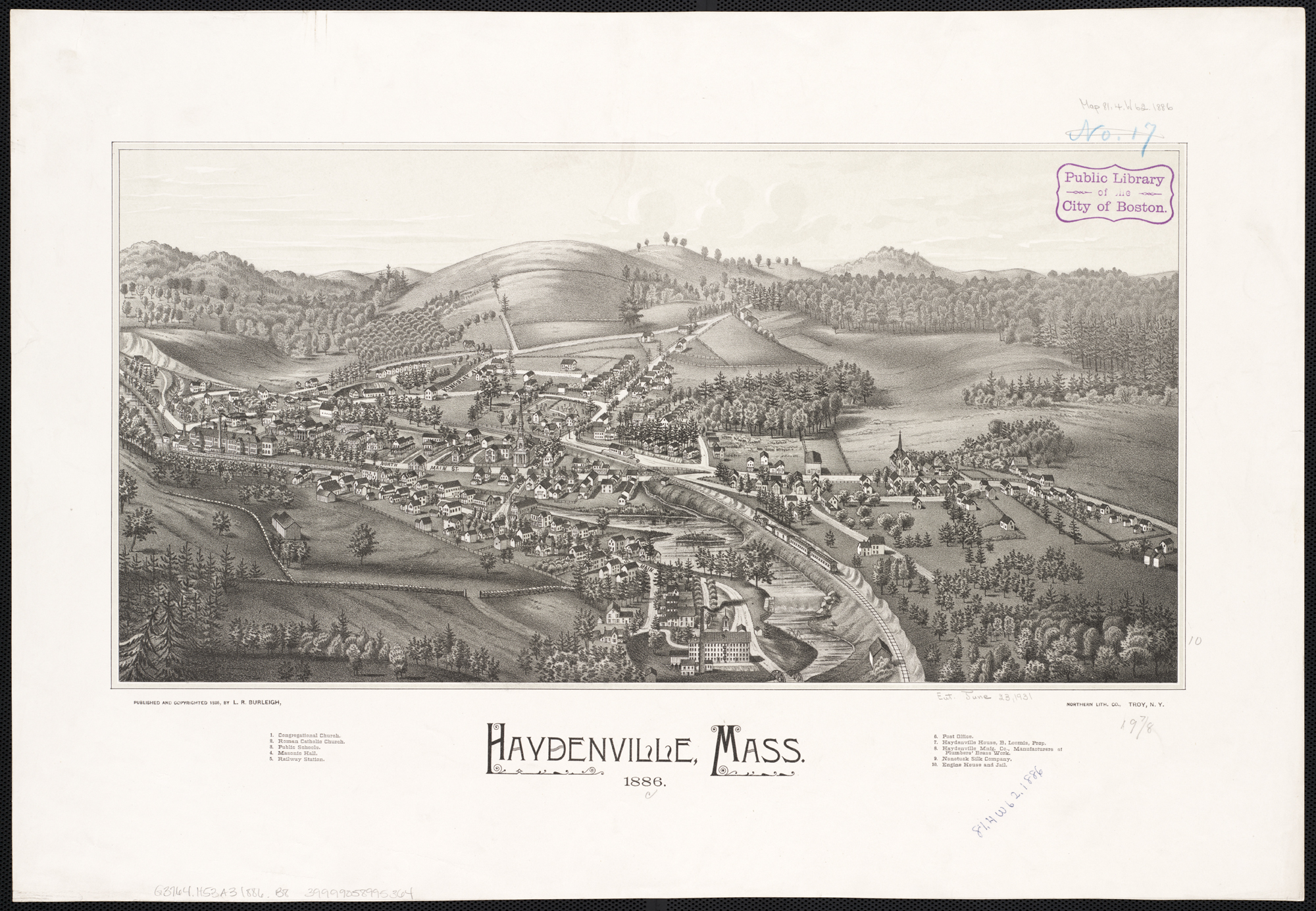
Print of Haydenville from 1886 by L. R. Burleigh with listing of landmarks depicted

The area was first settled in 1735 and was officially incorporated in 1771. In addition to the main village of Williamsburg near the center of town, the town includes the villages of Haydenville and Searsville. Haydenville is now recognized by the Haydenville Historic District. The Mill River flows southeast from Williamsburg village, where the East and West branches join, through Haydenville and into Northampton, on its way to the Connecticut River.

Searsville (+42° 24' 00.00", −72° 43' 58.00) is referenced three times in the 1904 book Hampshire County History on the highway between Williamsburg and Goshen approximately one mile above the center of the village, is the settlement of Searsville. In 1795, Rufus Hyde moved his blacksmith shop down from Meetinghouse Hill to the banks of the stream in what was soon to become the industrial community of Searsville. Shortly after the turn of the 18th century, three or four small shops were established in Williamsburg and Searsville to specialize in the final processing of these [woolen] goods. the fulling, dying [sic] and dressing operations. It was not until 1813 that spinning and weaving moved from household to factory. In 1819 Nathaniel Sears (1796–1886) son of Rufus Sears and Priscilla Sears built a small shop for the dressing of woolen cloth in this community which became known as Searsville.

Massachusetts Route 9 is the main highway through the town, leading southeast 7 miles (11 km) to the center of Northampton and west 33 miles (53 km) to Pittsfield. Massachusetts Route 143 leads west from Williamsburg village to Chesterfield and Worthington.

=== The Mill River flood ===
On the morning of May 16, 1874, a flood along Williamsburg's Mill River claimed 139 lives and left nearly 800 victims homeless throughout Hampshire County. The deluge occurred when the Williamsburg Reservoir Dam unexpectedly burst, sending a twenty-foot wall of water surging into the valley below. Every town and village along the river's normally placid flow was soon devastated by the great rush of water. Much of the flood's force was abated in Northampton, at the Mill River's confluence with the Connecticut River. Located over twelve miles from the breached dam in Williamsburg, Northampton was the last town to experience the flood's fury, with four additional victims swept away in the swell.

== Geography ==
According to the United States Census Bureau, the town has a total area of 25.7 square miles (66.6 km^{2}), of which 25.6 square miles (66.2 km^{2}) are land and 0.2 square miles (0.4 km^{2}), or 0.53%, are water.

== Demographics ==
Historical population
Year	Pop.	±%
1790	1,049	—
1850	1,537	+46.5%
1860	2,095	+36.3%
1870	2,159	+3.1%
1880	2,234	+3.5%
1890	2,057	−7.9%
1900	1,926	−6.4%
1910	2,132	+10.7%
1920	1,866	−12.5%
1930	1,801	−3.5%
1940	1,684	−6.5%
1950	2,056	+22.1%
1960	2,186	+6.3%
1970	2,342	+7.1%
1980	2,237	−4.5%
1990	2,515	+12.4%
2000	2,427	−3.5%
2010	2,482	+2.3%
2020	2,504	+0.9%
2022*	2,469	−1.4%
* = population estimate. Source: United States census records and Population Estimates Program data.

As of the census of 2000, there were 2,427 people, 1,027 households, and 658 families residing in the town. The population density was 94.7 inhabitants per square mile (36.6/km^{2}). There were 1,073 housing units at an average density of 41.9 per square mile (16.2/km^{2}). The racial makeup of the town was 97.94% White, 0.25% African American, 0.08% Native American, 0.49% Asian, 0.16% from other races, and 1.07% from two or more races. Hispanic or Latino people of any race were 0.66% of the population.

There were 1,027 households, out of which 29.4% had children under the age of 18 living with them, 51.7% were married couples living together, 8.8% had a female householder with no husband present, and 35.9% were non-families. 25.1% of all households were made up of individuals, and 9.1% had someone living alone who was 65 years of age or older. The average household size was 2.36 and the average family size was 2.88.

In the town, the population was spread out, with 21.3% under the age of 18, 5.0% from 18 to 24, 29.4% from 25 to 44, 31.4% from 45 to 64, and 12.9% who were 65 years of age or older. The median age was 42 years. For every 100 females, there were 89.3 males. For every 100 females age 18 and over, there were 89.2 males.

The median income for a household in the town was $47,250, and the median income for a family was $55,833. Males had a median income of $36,977 versus $28,906 for females. The per capita income for the town was $25,813. About 1.2% of families and 5.5% of the population were below the poverty line, including 2.9% of those under age 18 and 10.7% of those age 65 or over.

Williamsburg is known in the region for its quaint town center which includes the Williamsburg General Store, the Williamsburg Market, the Meekins Library and the town Post Office.

== Notable people ==
- Chris Collingwood, lead singer of pop-punk band Fountains of Wayne
- Alice Hall Farnsworth, astronomer
- Ruth V. Hemenway, Christian medical missionary
- Fay Jones, artist
- Tracy Kidder, author and Pulitzer Prize winner
- Frederick A. Lyon, soldier in the Union Army and a Medal of Honor recipient for his actions in the American Civil War
- Patricia MacLachlan, author of best-selling books such as Sarah, Plain and Tall
- Argalus Starks, Wisconsin state legislator
- Sarah Thomas, vice president for libraries, Harvard University
- Edward Thorndike, prominent educational psychologist and eugenicist
- Bob Toski, golfer and teaching professional, winner of 11 professional golf tournaments
