= Florence, Massachusetts =

Village in Northampton, Massachusetts

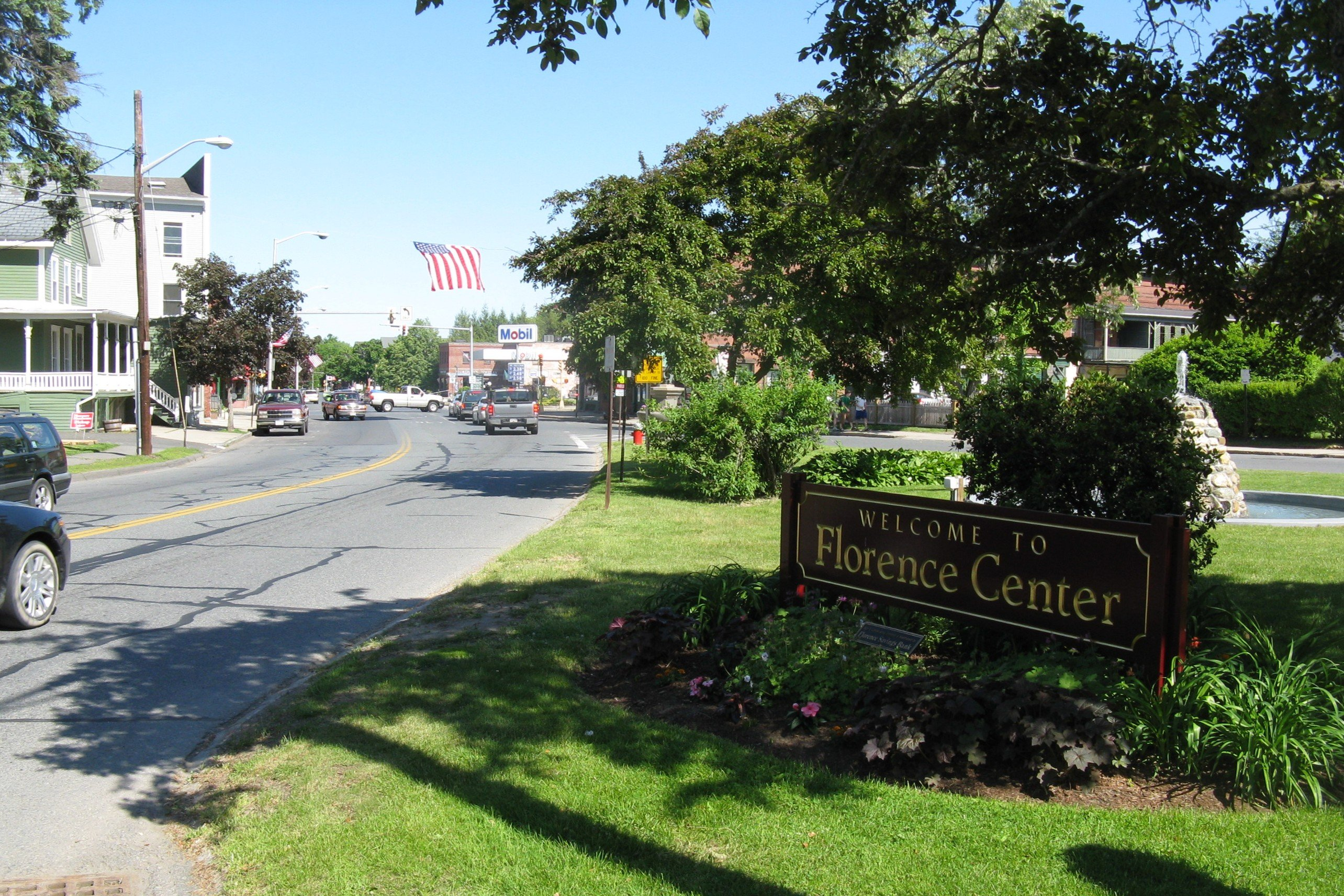
- Entering Florence
- Interactive map of Florence, Massachusetts
- Coordinates: 42°20′08″N 72°40′18″W
- Country: United States
- State: Massachusetts
- County: Hampshire
- City: Northampton
- ZIP code: 01062
- Area code: 413

Florence is a village in the northwestern portion of the city of Northampton, Hampshire County, Massachusetts, United States. During the 19th century, Florence was a thriving manufacturing village shaped by progressive ideas on religion, abolitionism, and education.

== History ==
=== Early history ===
Before the arrival of European settlers, the area of Florence and Northampton was called Nonotuck, meaning either "middle of the river" or "far away land." Nonotuck was a settlement in the Pocumtuc confederacy.

=== Name ===
The Florence area was known as "Broughton's Meadow" referring to John Broughton, an English settler who purchased land in 1657 that included what is now Northampton and Florence. Broughton's Meadow was used to describe the area until 1846. Other names included "Warner School District" after three brothers who had lived in the area during the early 19th century, and "The Community" referring to the Northampton Association of Education and Industry from 1842 through 1846. In 1848, the village took on the name Bensonville after George W. Benson and the Bensonville Manufacturing Company. After Benson's company went bankrupt in 1849, the village adopted the name Greenville after Greenville Manufacturing Company.

In preparation for creating a post office, the village came together in the fall of 1852 to select a new name. The name "Florence" was suggested by Dr. Charles Munde, and this name was approved by residents.

=== 19th century ===
==== Early industry ====
Factory villages along the Mill River were producing cotton goods, silk, wool, thread, buttons, wood items for domestic use, furniture, and leather by 1840.

Samuel Whitmarsh moved to Northampton in 1829 and was convinced that silk production would be a promising business venture. He planted 25 acres (10 ha) of mulberry trees in Florence in order to raise silkworms. Whitmarsh's company, the Northampton Silk Company, began manufacturing silk thread in 1837. Due to economic recession and losing critical investors, Whitmarsh sold this business which was later purchased by the Northampton Association of Education and Industry. Silk production would go on to be an important product in the Florence economy.

==== Northampton Association of Education and Industry (NAEI) ====
Northampton Association of Education and Industry (NAEI) was founded in 1842. This utopian community drew upon the principles of Fourierism and mixed it with interests in radical abolitionism, temperance, manufacturing, and education. Members of NAEI believed that the rights of all should be "equal without distinction of sex, color or condition, sect or religion." The association was 1 of 3 utopian groups founded in Massachusetts before the Civil War.

==== Notable residents ====
Sojourner Truth, a former slave from the Hudson Valley in New York, moved to Florence in 1843 to become a member of the NAEI community. After the community dissolved in 1846, she bought a house on Park Street where she lived until 1857. In Florence, Truth gave her first public lecture and developed her craft as a public speaker. She met Olive Gilbert within the NAEI community who would transcribe Narrative of Sojourner Truth: A Northern Slave. NAEI introduced Truth to William Lloyd Garrison who connected her to the printer of The Liberator and Frederick Douglass's slave narrative. Truth published her narrative in 1850 on credit with the same publisher. A memorial statue was erected in her honor in Florence in 2002.

David Ruggles was an African American abolitionist, journalist, business owner, and a practitioner of hydropathy. He was one of the founders of the New York Committee of Vigilance, an organization dedicated to protecting the rights and safety of African Americans in the 1830s. By the early 1840s, Ruggles was struggling due to falling out with the New York Committee of Vigilance, the death of his father, protests in New England over segregated seating on trains, and his overall declining health rendered him almost blind. On learning of his health and financial struggles, Lydia Maria Child and others arranged for him to join the NAEI community. As a member of the community, he sought out hydropathic treatments for his ailments under Dr. Robert Wesselhoeft in Cambridge. Ruggles began practicing hydropathy himself, and in 1845 he established a water cure hospital on the Mill River. Ruggles died in Florence in 1849 at the age of 39.

==== Underground Railroad ====
Florence residents Samuel L. Hill, David Ruggles, Seth Hunt, Austin Ross, A.P. Critchlow, and Elisha Hammond have been identified as part of the Underground Railroad network working to free the enslaved.

==== Manufacturing and industry ====
The Nonotuck Silk Company later changed its name to the Corticelli Silk Company. It grew to be one of the world's largest producers of silk thread, made with raw silk imported from Japan. The company went out of business in 1930.

=== 20th century ===
Mirage Studios, the creative force behind the Teenage Mutant Ninja Turtles comic books, was based out of a renovated factory space in Florence.

Florence was the filming location for the 1999 movie, In Dreams.

The Miss Florence Diner opened in 1941 and is a popular landmark on the National Register of Historic Places. Coopers Corner opened in 1938.

=== 21st century ===
Many former factories in Florence now host art studios and small retail stores, such as the Brushworks Arts and Industry Building.

== Places of interest ==
=== Historical ===
- The former Ross Farm on Meadow Street was a site on the Underground Railroad in the 19th century under the ownership of abolitionist Austin Ross.

=== Current ===
- The Hill Institute is a private school founded by Samuel L. Hill which now offers youth, teen, and adult handicraft classes.
- Look Park is a 150-acre municipal park that is open year-round. Look Park is the largest park in Florence and greater Northampton, with a small water park, tennis courts, several play structures, paddle boats, a miniature golf course, a 1-mile loop miniature train, as well as covered picnic areas and pavilions.
- The Northampton Bikeway is a 2.5 mile multi-use trail from downtown Northampton to Florence, Look Park, and further west into the village of Leeds, Massachusetts.
- The Sojourner Truth Memorial Statue designed by Thomas Jay Warren at 121 Pine Street was completed in 2002.
- The David Ruggles Center for History and Education works to document anti-slavery and abolitionist history in the Connecticut River Valley.
- Lilly Library was built in 1889 with funding from A.T. Lilly.
- The Florence Pie Bar opened in 2014 and serves sweet and savory pies and pastries that are seasonally inspired using locally sourced ingredients.
- BOMBYX Center for Arts and Equity is a non-profit organization that serves as a community gathering space, performance venue, and art exhibition space.
