= Springfield, Massachusetts =

Springfield
- City
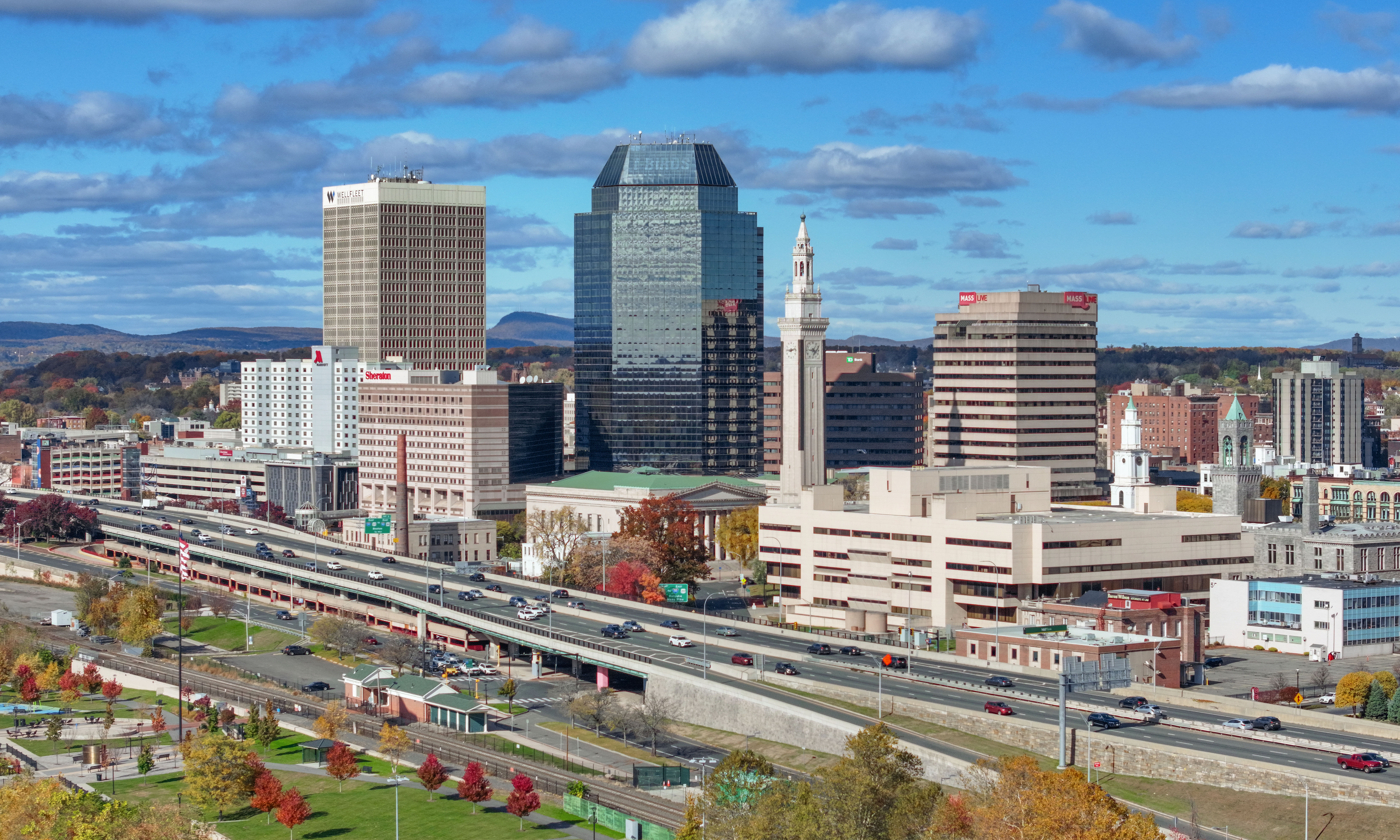
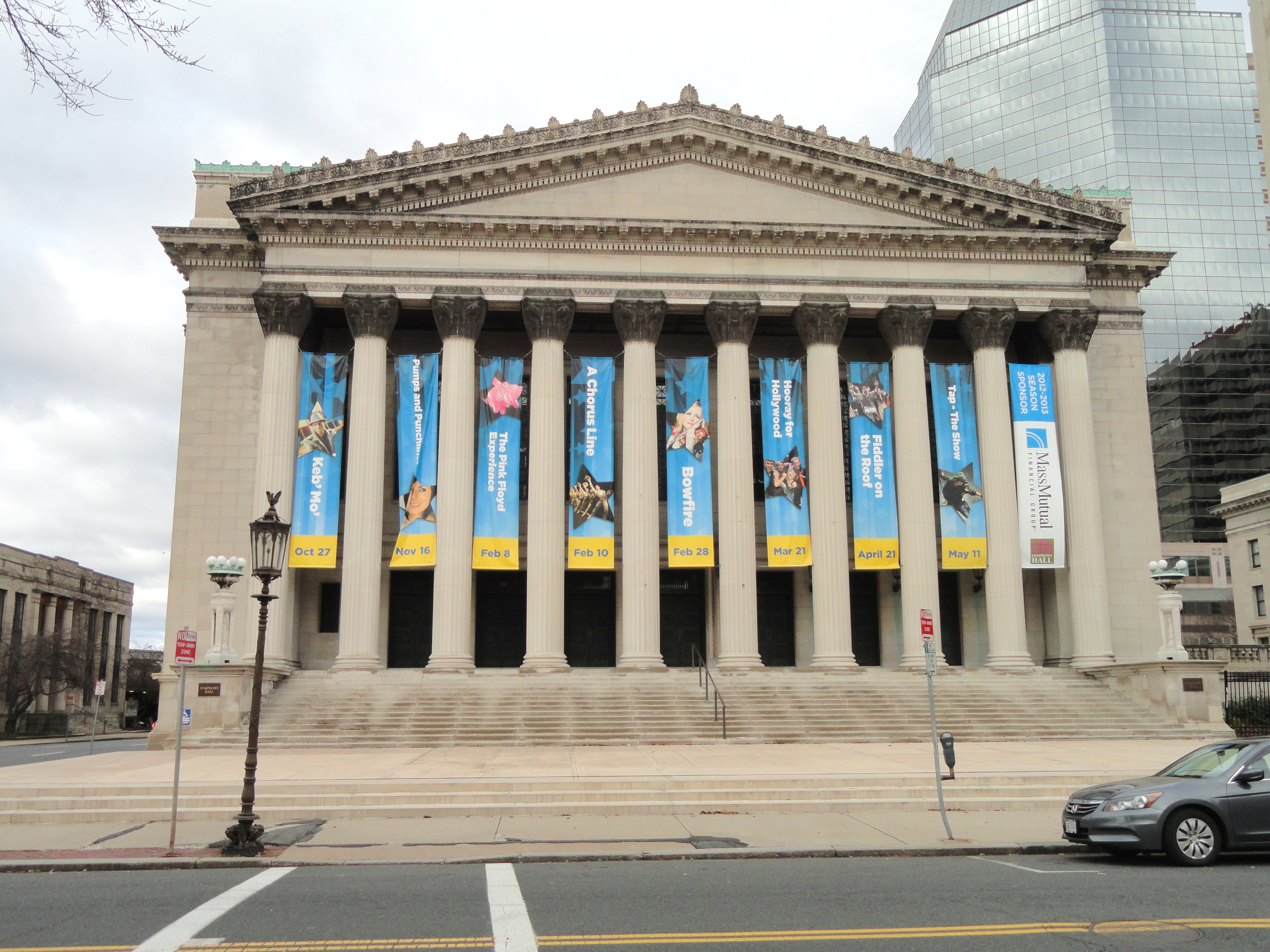
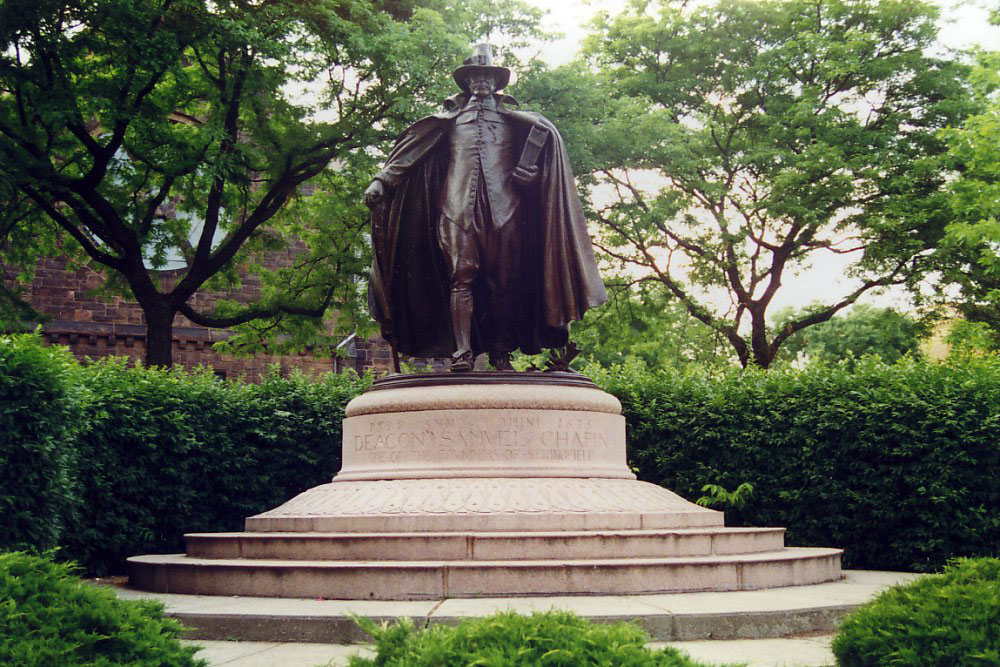
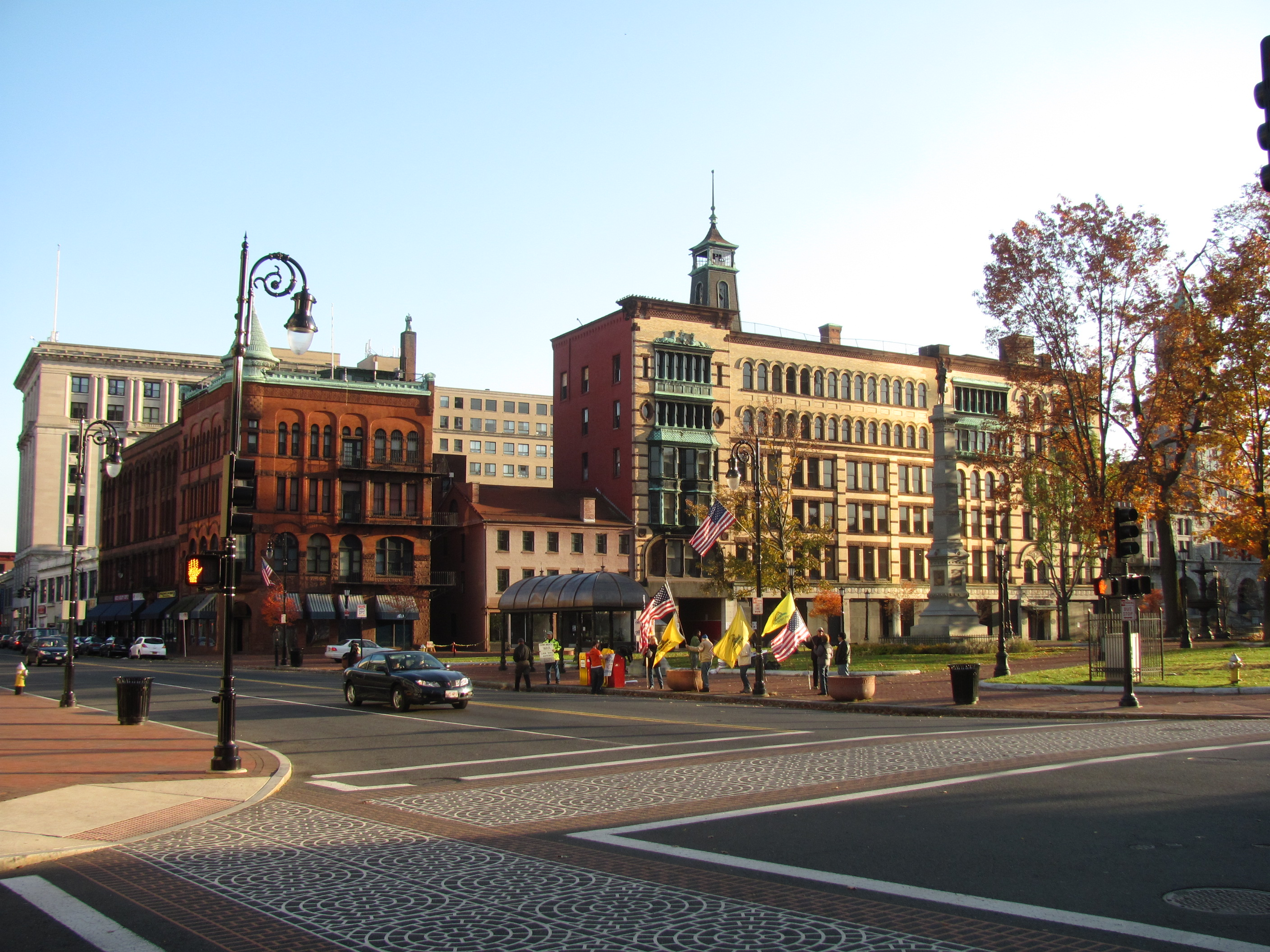
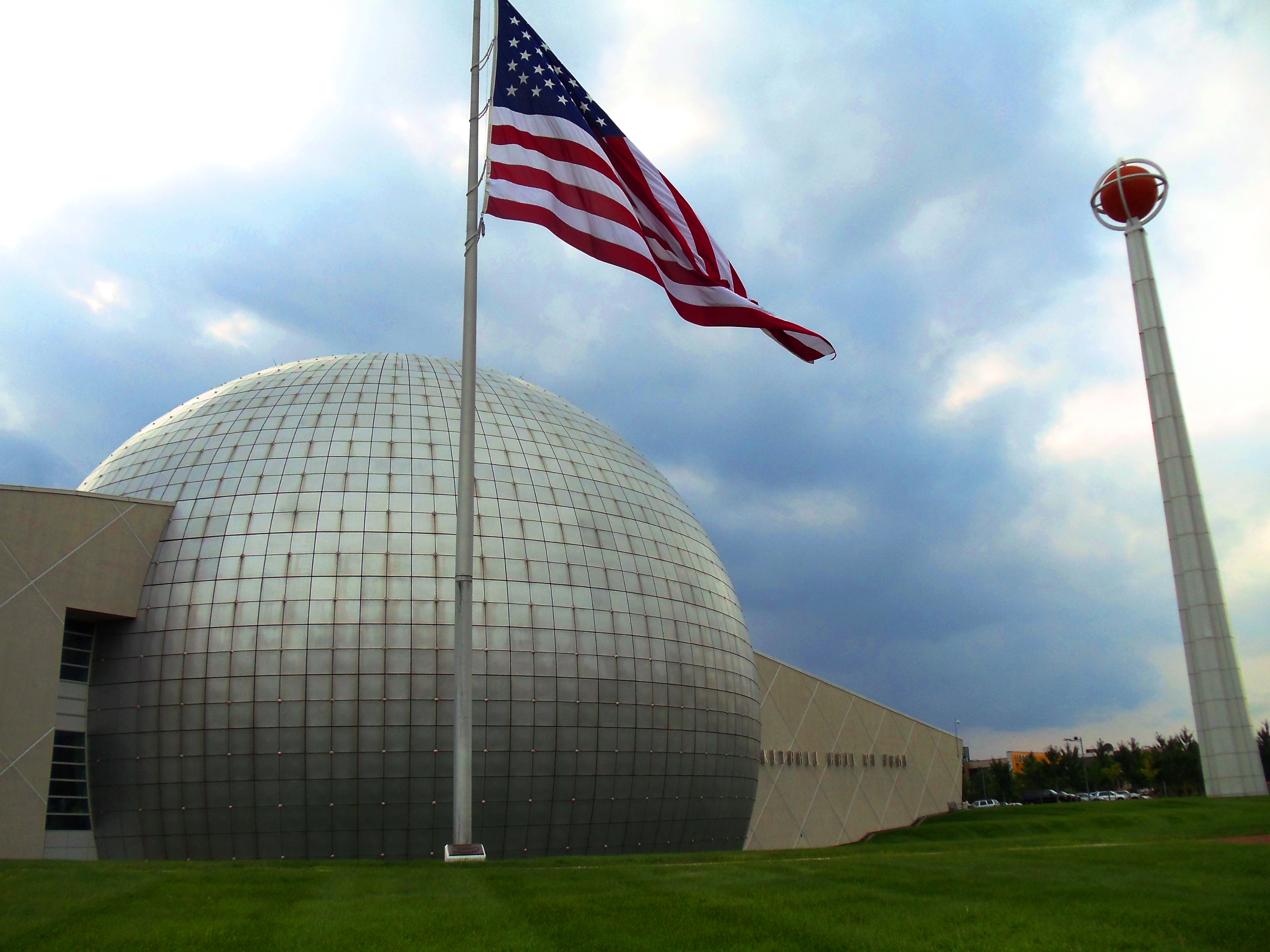
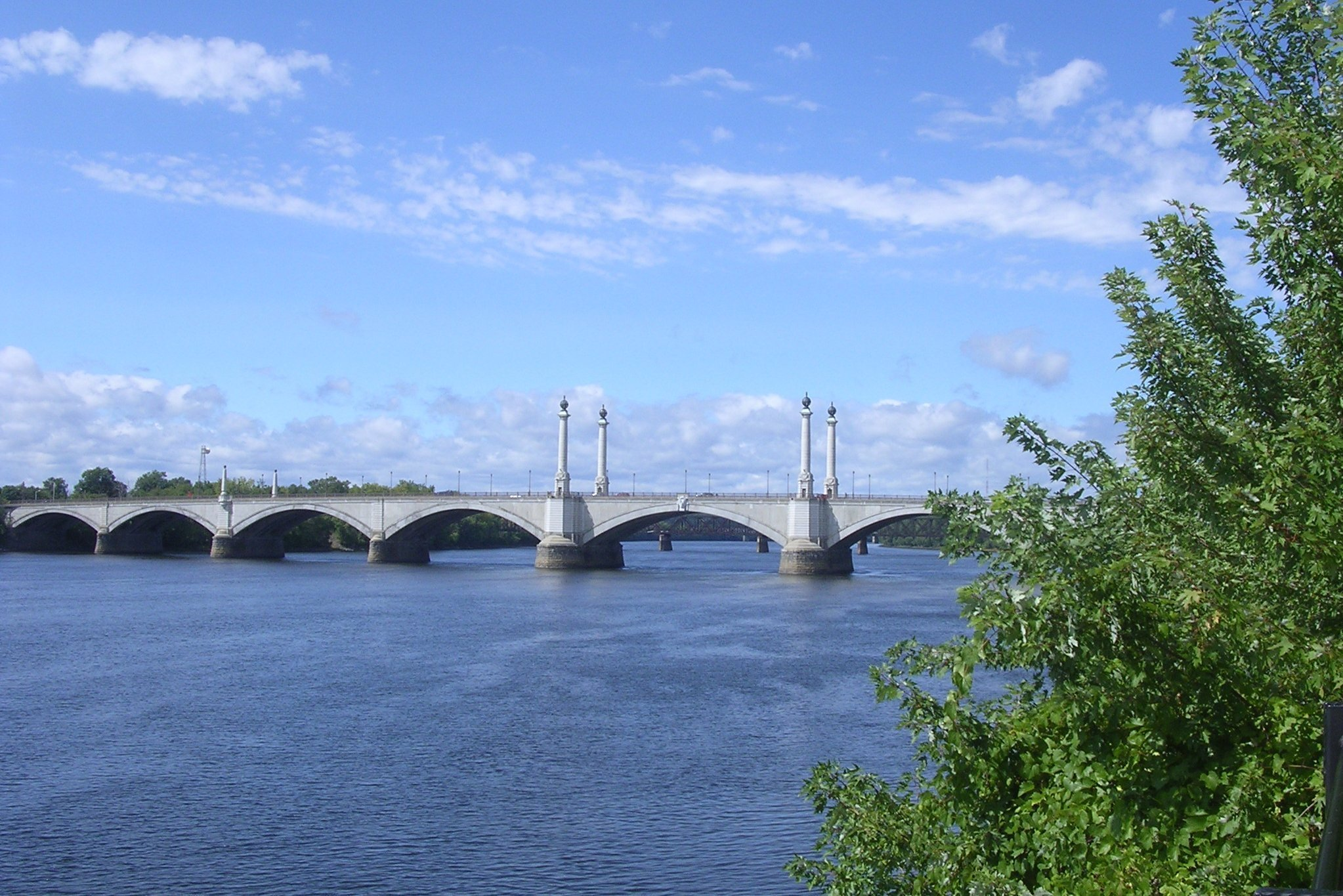
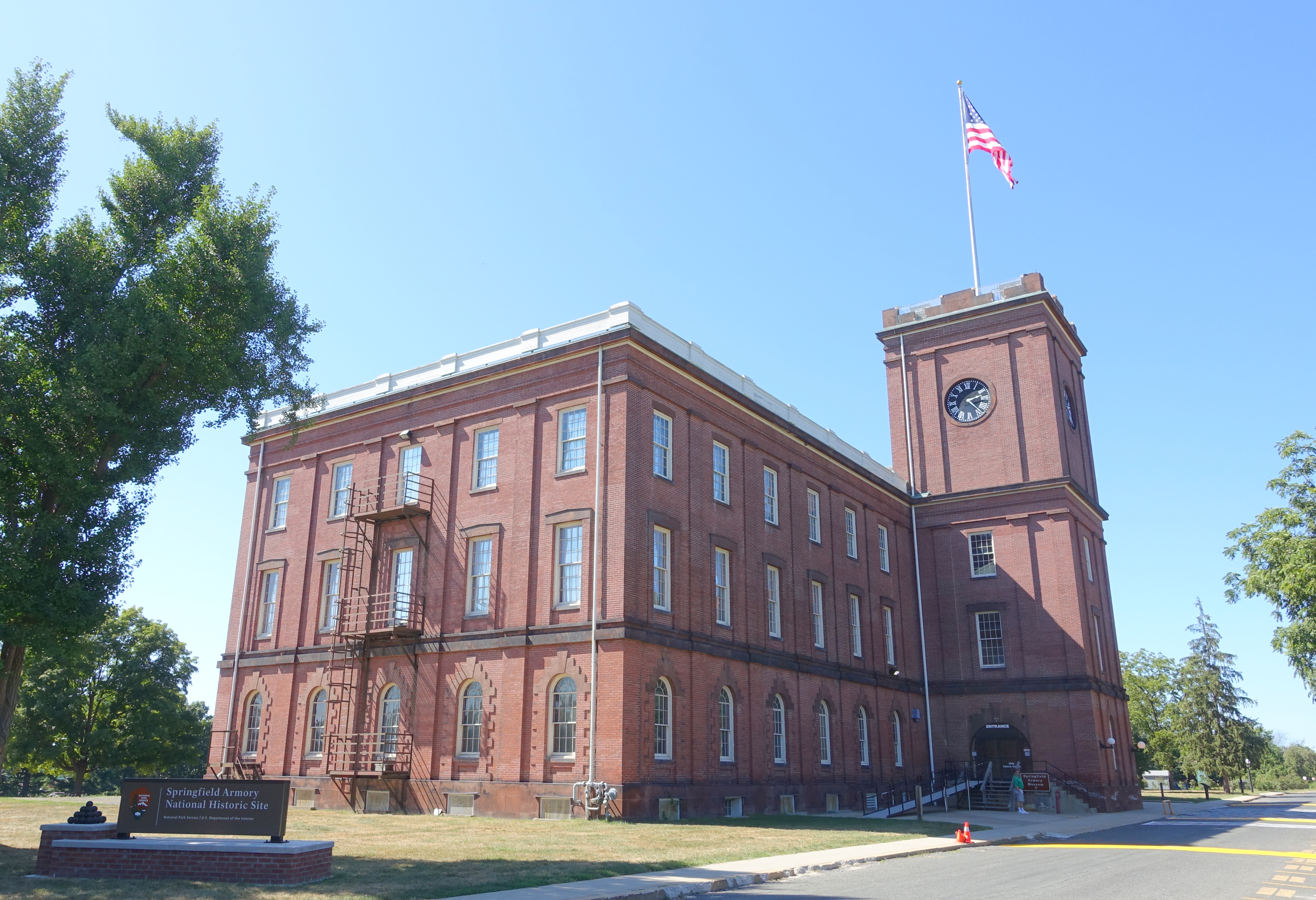
- Springfield skyline Symphony Hall The Puritan Court Square Basketball Hall of Fame Hampden County Memorial Bridge Springfield Armory

- Flag Seal Coat of arms
- Nicknames: The City of Firsts; The City of Progress; The City of Homes; A City in the Forest; Hoop City; The Western Gateway to New England
- Interactive map of Springfield
- Location within Massachusetts Location within the United States
- Coordinates: 42°06′05″N 72°35′25″W
- Country: United States
- State: Massachusetts
- County: Hampden
- Region: New England
- Historic countries: Kingdom of England; Kingdom of Great Britain
- Historic colonies: Connecticut Colony (1636–1641); Massachusetts Bay Colony (1641–1686, 1689–1691); Dominion of New England (1686–1689); Province of Massachusetts Bay (1691–1780)
- Settled (town): May 14, 1636; 390 years ago
- Incorporated (city): May 25, 1852; 174 years ago
- Founder: William Pynchon
- Named for: Springfield, Essex

Government
  - Type: Mayor-council city
  - Mayor: Domenic Sarno (D)

Area
  - City: 33.08 sq mi (85.68 km^{2})
  - Land: 31.87 sq mi (82.54 km^{2})
  - Water: 1.21 sq mi (3.14 km^{2})
- Elevation: 69 ft (21 m)

Population (2020)
  - City: 155,929
  - Rank: 168th, U.S. as of 2020 incorporated places estimate
  - Density: 4,892.7/sq mi (1,889.08/km^{2})
  - Urban: 442,145 (US: 92nd)
  - Urban density: 2,191/sq mi (846.1/km^{2})
  - Metro: 699,162 (US: 87th)
- Demonym(s): Springfieldian (Note: While both demonyms are listed in the Merriam-Webster Dictionary, there is some indication that Springfieldian is given some propriety: "In at least two cases, the name of the resident depends on which state the town is in: Richmonder in Virginia but Richmondite in Indiana; Springfieldian in Massachusetts but Springfielder in Ohio."); Springfielder
- Time zone: UTC−5 (Eastern)
  - Summer (DST): UTC−4 (Eastern)
- ZIP Codes: 01101–01105, 01107–01109, 01118–01119, 01128–01129, 01144, 01151
- Area code: 413
- FIPS code: 25-67000
- GNIS feature ID: 0609092
- GDP: US$30 billion
- Website: www.springfield-ma.gov

Springfield is the most populous city in Hampden County, Massachusetts, United States, and its county seat. Springfield sits on the eastern bank of the Connecticut River near its confluence with three rivers: the western Westfield River, the eastern Chicopee River, and the eastern Mill River. At the 2020 census, the city's population was 155,929, making it the third most populous city in Massachusetts and the fourth most populous city in New England, after Boston, Worcester, and Providence. The Springfield metropolitan area, one of two metropolitan areas in Massachusetts (the other being Greater Boston), (Note: Combined statistical areas (CSAs) as defined by the US Census.) had a population of 699,162 in 2020.

Springfield was founded in 1636, the first Springfield in the New World. In the late 1700s, during the American Revolution, Springfield was designated by George Washington as the site of the Springfield Armory because of its central location. Subsequently it was the site of Shays' Rebellion. The city would also play a pivotal role in the Civil War, as a stop on the Underground Railroad and home of abolitionist John Brown, widely known for his raid on Harpers Ferry, and for the Armory's manufacture of the famed "Springfield rifles" used ubiquitously by Union troops. Closing during the Lyndon B. Johnson administration, today the national park site features the largest collection of historic American firearms in the world.

Today the city is the largest in western New England, and the urban, economic, and media capital of Massachusetts' section of the Connecticut River Valley, colloquially known as the Pioneer Valley. Springfield has several nicknames—"The City of Firsts", due to the many innovations developed there, such as the first American dictionary, the first American gas-powered automobile, and the first machining lathe for interchangeable parts; "The City of Homes", due to its Victorian residential architecture; and "Hoop City", as basketball was invented in Springfield in 1891 by Canadian James Naismith.

Hartford, the capital of Connecticut, lies 24 miles (39 km) south of Springfield on the western bank of the Connecticut River. The Hartford–Springfield region is known as the Knowledge Corridor because it hosts over 160,000 university students and over 32 universities and liberal arts colleges—the second-highest concentration of higher-learning institutions in the United States. The city of Springfield itself is home to Springfield College, Western New England University, American International College, and Springfield Technical Community College, among other higher educational institutions.

== History ==
=== Prehistory ===
The area that would become Springfield was historically inhabited by indigenous people, with documented middle archaic period sites, a ceramic workshop site from the Woodland period in south Springfield, and the contact period Long Hill site, excavated in 1895.

At the time of European contact at settlement, the Springfield area was inhabited by the Agawam tribe, who sold land to English settlers.

=== Colonial period ===
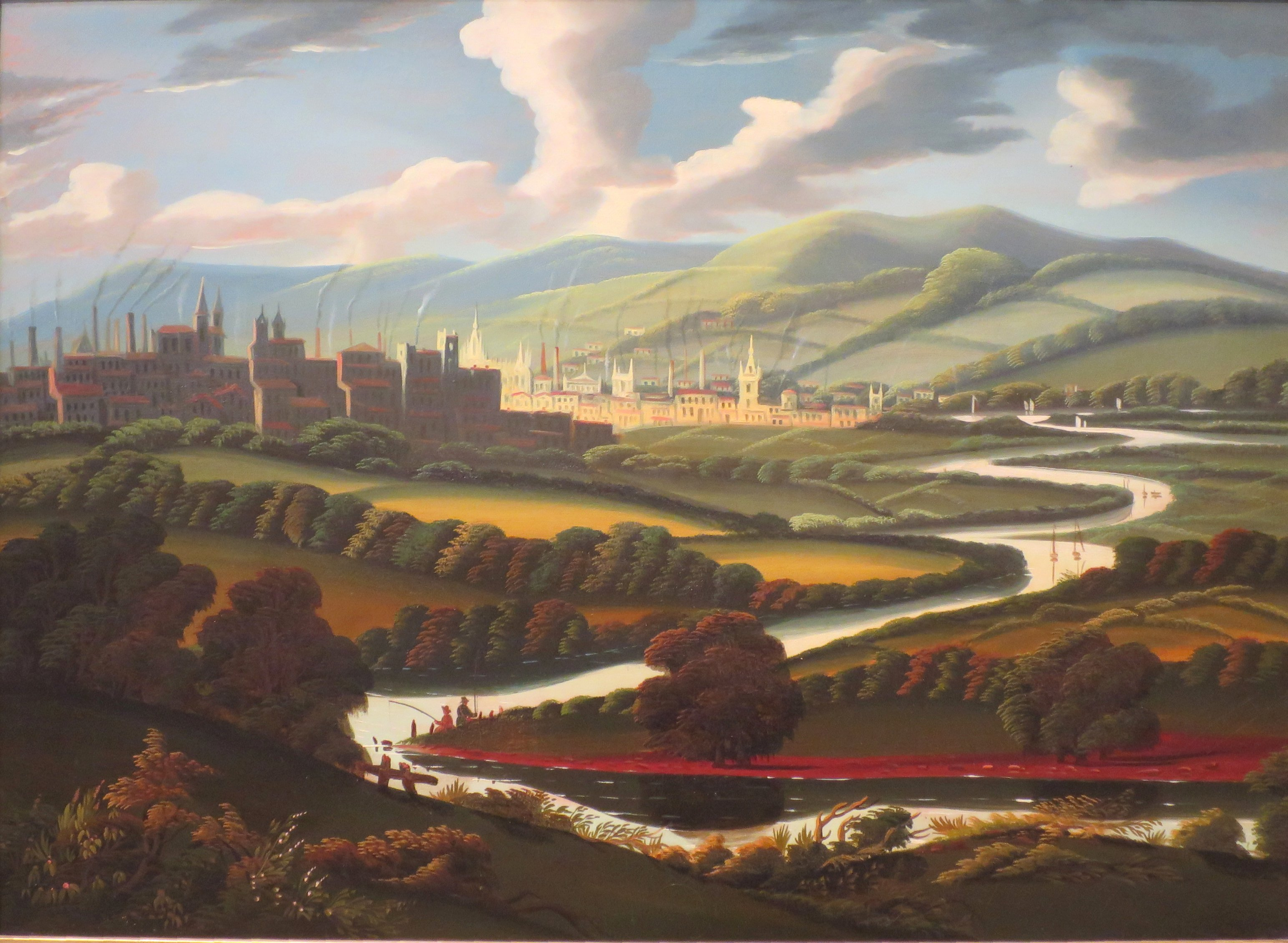
View of Springfield, Massachusetts, on the Connecticut River c. 1840–1845, by Thomas Chambers

Springfield was founded in 1636 by English Puritan William Pynchon as "Agawam Plantation" under the administration of the Connecticut Colony. In 1641 it was renamed after Pynchon's hometown of Springfield, Essex, England, following incidents, including trade disputes as well as Captain John Mason's hostilities toward native tribes, which precipitated the settlement's joining the Massachusetts Bay Colony. During its early existence, Springfield flourished both as an agricultural settlement and as a trading post, although its prosperity waned dramatically during (and after) King Philip's War in 1675, when natives laid siege to it and burned it to the ground. During that attack, three-quarters of the original settlement was burned to the ground, with many of Springfield's residents surviving by taking refuge in John Pynchon's brick house, the "Old Fort", the first such house to be built in the Connecticut River Valley. Out of the siege, Miles Morgan and his sons were lauded as heroes; as one of the few homesteads to survive the attack, alerting troops in Hadley, as well as Toto, often referred to as the "Windsor Indian" who, running 20 miles from Windsor, Connecticut, to the settlement, was able to give advance warning of the attack.

The original settlement—today's downtown Springfield—was located atop bluffs at the confluence of four rivers, at the nexus of trade routes to Boston, Albany, New York City, and Montreal, and with some of the northeastern United States' most fertile soil.

=== Post-colonial period ===
In 1777, Springfield's location at numerous crossroads led George Washington and Henry Knox to establish the United States' National Armory at Springfield, which produced the first American musket in 1794, and later the famous Springfield rifle. From 1777 until its closing during the Vietnam War, the Springfield Armory attracted skilled laborers to Springfield, making it the United States' longtime center for precision manufacturing. The near-capture of the armory during Shays' Rebellion of 1787 led directly to the formation of the U.S. Constitutional Convention.

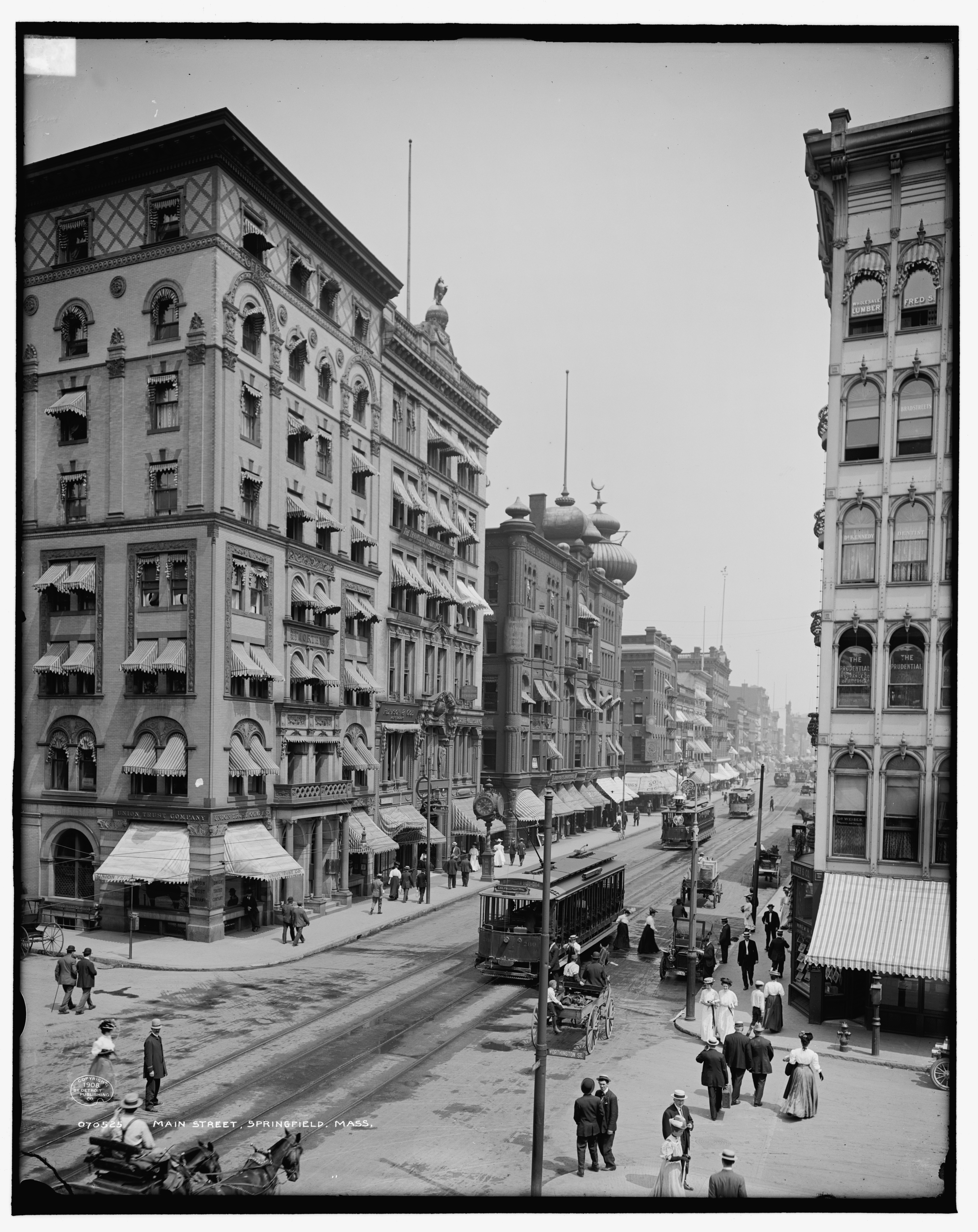
Main Street, 1908

During the 19th and 20th centuries, Springfielders produced many innovations, including the first American-English dictionary (1805, Merriam-Webster); the first use of interchangeable parts and the assembly line in manufacturing (1819, Thomas Blanchard); the first American horseless car (1825, Thomas Blanchard); the mass production of vulcanized rubber (1844, Charles Goodyear); the first American gasoline-powered car (1893, Duryea Brothers); the first successful motorcycle company (1901, "Indian"); one of America's first commercial radio stations (1921, WBZ, broadcast from the Hotel Kimball); and most famously, the world's second-most-popular sport, basketball (1891, Dr. James Naismith). Springfield would play major roles in machine production, initially driven by the arms industry of the Armory, as well as from private companies such as Smith & Wesson, established by Horace Smith and Daniel B. Wesson. Similarly, the industrial economy led Thomas and Charles Wason to establish the Wason Manufacturing Company, which produced the first manufactured sleeping car. The largest railcar works in New England, Wason produced 100 cars a day at its peak; the company was eventually purchased by Brill in 1907 and closed during the Depression in 1937. Among numerous other industries, during the first half of the 20th century Springfield also produced brass goods, chemicals, clothing and knit goods, paper goods, watches, boilers, engines, manufacturing machinery, silverware, jewelry, skates, carriages, buttons, needles, toys, and printed books and magazines.

Springfield underwent a protracted decline during the second half of the 20th century, due largely to the decommissioning of the Springfield Armory in 1969; poor city planning decisions, such as the location of the elevated I-91 along the city's Connecticut River front; and overall decline of industry throughout the northeastern United States. During the 1980s and 1990s, Springfield developed a national reputation for crime, political corruption, and cronyism. During the early 21st century, Springfield saw long-term revitalization projects and several large projects, including the $1 billion New Haven–Hartford–Springfield intercity rail; a $1 billion MGM casino., and the $95 million redevelopment of Springfield Union Station. In December 2022, Springfield was designated by the National Park Service as an American World War II Heritage City, the first in the Commonwealth of Massachusetts and one of only 18 communities in the country.

== Geography ==
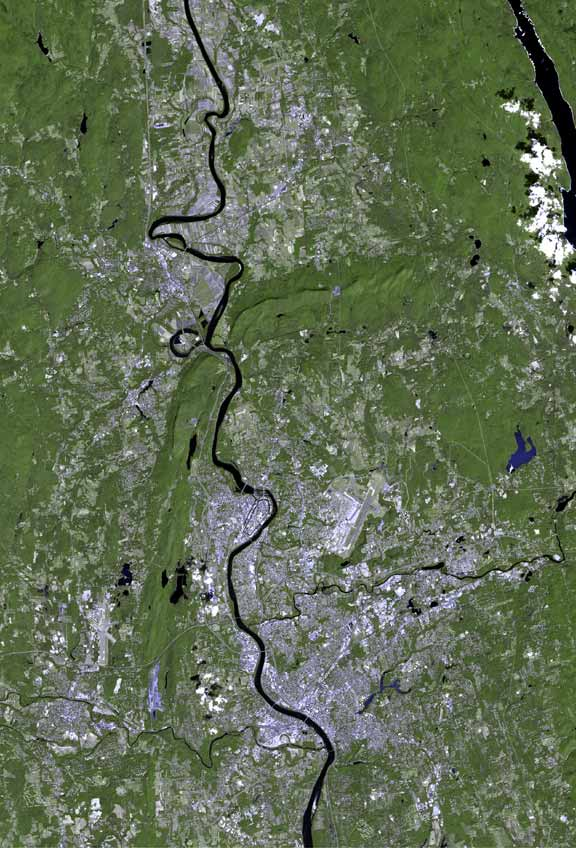
Springfield satellite image

According to the United States Census Bureau, the city has a total area of 33.1 square miles (85.7 km^{2}), of which 31.9 square miles (82.5 km^{2}) are land and 1.2 square miles (3.1 km^{2}), or 3.65%, are water. Once nicknamed "The City in a Forest", Springfield features over 4.0 square miles (10.4 km^{2}) of urban parkland, 12% of its total land area.

Located in the fertile Connecticut River Valley, surrounded by mountains, bluffs, and rolling hills in all cardinal directions, Springfield sits on the eastern bank of the Connecticut River, near its confluence with two major tributary rivers—the western Westfield River, which flows into the Connecticut opposite Springfield's South End Bridge; and the eastern Chicopee River, which flows into the Connecticut less than 0.5 mi (0.8 km) north of Springfield, in the city of Chicopee (which constituted one of Springfield's most populous neighborhoods until it separated and became an independent municipality in 1852). The Connecticut state line is only 4 miles (6 km) south of Springfield, beside the wealthy suburb of Longmeadow, which itself separated from Springfield in 1783.

Springfield's densely urban Metro Center district surrounding Main Street is relatively flat, and follows the north–south trajectory of the Connecticut River; however, as one moves eastward, the city becomes increasingly hilly.

Aside from its rivers, Springfield's second most prominent topographical feature is the city's 735-acre (297 ha) Forest Park. Forest Park lies in the southwestern corner of the city, surrounded by Springfield's attractive garden districts, Forest Park and Forest Park Heights, which feature over 600 Victorian Painted Lady mansions. Forest Park also borders Longmeadow. Springfield shares borders with other suburbs such as East Longmeadow, Wilbraham, Ludlow and the city of Chicopee. The small cities of Agawam and West Springfield lie less than a mile (1.6 km) from Springfield's Metro Center, across the Connecticut River.

The City of Springfield also owns the Springfield Country Club, located in the autonomous city of West Springfield, which separated from Springfield in 1774.

=== Climate ===
Springfield, MA

Climate chart (precipitation, max. and min. temperature)
J	F	M	A	M	J	J	A	S	O	N	D
3.2 35 18	2.9 39 21	3.6 48 28	3.7 61 38	4.4 71 48	4.4 80 57	4.2 85 63	3.9 83 61	3.9 75 53	4.4 63 41	3.9 52 33	3.4 40 23
- █ Average max. and min. temperatures in °F
- █ Precipitation totals in inches
Metric conversion
J	F	M	A	M	J	J	A	S	O	N	D
82 1 −8	73 4 −6	92 9 −2	94 16 4	110 22 9	110 26 14	106 29 17	100 28 16	99 24 12	111 17 5	99 11 1	87 4 −5
- █ Average max. and min. temperatures in °C
- █ Precipitation totals in mm

Springfield, like other cities in southern New England, has a hot-summer humid continental climate (Köppen: Dfa) with four distinct seasons and precipitation evenly distributed throughout the year, but the intensity (and sometimes the duration) of warmer periods is greater than in northern areas. Winters are cold with a daily average in January of around 26 °F (−3 °C). During winter, nor'easter storms can drop significant snowfalls on Springfield and the Connecticut River Valley. Temperatures below 0 °F (−18 °C) can occur each year, though the area does not experience the high snowfall amounts and blustery wind averages of nearby cities such as Worcester, Massachusetts, and Albany, New York.

Springfield's summers are very warm and sometimes humid. During summer, several times per month, on hot days afternoon thunderstorms will develop when unstable warm air collides with approaching cold fronts. The daily average in July is around 74 °F (23 °C). Usually several days during the summer exceed 90 °F (32 °C), constituting a "heat wave". Spring and fall temperatures are usually pleasant, with mild days and crisp, cool nights. Precipitation averages 45.85 inches (1,165 mm) annually, and snowfall averages 40.5 inches (103 cm), most of which falls from mid-December to early March. Although not unheard of, extreme weather events like hurricanes and tornadoes occur infrequently in Springfield compared with other areas in the country. On the occasions that hurricanes have hit New England, Springfield's inland, upriver location has caused its damages to be considerably less than shoreline cities like New Haven, Connecticut, and Providence, Rhode Island.

On June 1, 2011, Springfield was directly struck by the second-largest tornado ever to hit Massachusetts. With wind speeds exceeding 160 mph (257 km/h), the tornado left three dead, hundreds injured, and over 500 homeless in the city alone. The tornado caused hundreds of millions of dollars' worth of damage to Springfield and wrought significant destruction in a 39-mile-long (63 km) path from Westfield to Charlton, Massachusetts. It was the first deadly tornado to strike Massachusetts since May 29, 1995.

Climate data for Bradley International Airport, Connecticut (1991–2020 normals, (Note: Mean monthly maxima and minima (i.e. the expected highest and lowest temperature readings at any point during the year or given month) calculated based on data at said location from 1991 to 2020.) extremes 1905–present) (Note: Official records for Hartford kept at downtown from January 1905 to December 1948, Brainard Airport from January 1949 to December 1954, and at Bradley Int'l in Windsor Locks since January 1955.)
Month	Jan	Feb	Mar	Apr	May	Jun	Jul	Aug	Sep	Oct	Nov	Dec	Year
Record high °F (°C)	72 (22)	77 (25)	89 (32)	96 (36)	99 (37)	100 (38)	103 (39)	102 (39)	101 (38)	91 (33)	84 (29)	76 (24)	103 (39)
Mean maximum °F (°C)	57.0 (13.9)	57.7 (14.3)	68.2 (20.1)	82.3 (27.9)	90.4 (32.4)	93.2 (34.0)	95.9 (35.5)	94.2 (34.6)	89.6 (32.0)	80.2 (26.8)	70.6 (21.4)	60.1 (15.6)	97.7 (36.5)
Mean daily maximum °F (°C)	35.8 (2.1)	38.5 (3.6)	47.3 (8.5)	60.5 (15.8)	71.7 (22.1)	79.9 (26.6)	85.2 (29.6)	83.3 (28.5)	75.7 (24.3)	63.5 (17.5)	51.5 (10.8)	40.6 (4.8)	61.1 (16.2)
Daily mean °F (°C)	27.1 (−2.7)	29.6 (−1.3)	37.8 (3.2)	49.5 (9.7)	60.0 (15.6)	68.9 (20.5)	74.3 (23.5)	72.5 (22.5)	64.8 (18.2)	53.0 (11.7)	42.3 (5.7)	32.6 (0.3)	51.0 (10.6)
Mean daily minimum °F (°C)	18.8 (−7.3)	20.7 (−6.3)	28.2 (−2.1)	38.4 (3.6)	48.4 (9.1)	57.8 (14.3)	63.4 (17.4)	61.7 (16.5)	53.8 (12.1)	42.4 (5.8)	33.0 (0.6)	24.6 (−4.1)	40.9 (4.9)
Mean minimum °F (°C)	−0.9 (−18.3)	1.9 (−16.7)	11.4 (−11.4)	26.3 (−3.2)	34.7 (1.5)	44.9 (7.2)	53.0 (11.7)	50.1 (10.1)	38.5 (3.6)	27.7 (−2.4)	17.7 (−7.9)	7.7 (−13.5)	−3.4 (−19.7)
Record low °F (°C)	−26 (−32)	−24 (−31)	−6 (−21)	9 (−13)	28 (−2)	37 (3)	44 (7)	36 (2)	30 (−1)	17 (−8)	1 (−17)	−18 (−28)	−26 (−32)
Average precipitation inches (mm)	3.28 (83)	3.13 (80)	3.81 (97)	3.88 (99)	3.79 (96)	4.28 (109)	4.17 (106)	4.21 (107)	4.39 (112)	4.52 (115)	3.51 (89)	4.08 (104)	47.05 (1,195)
Average snowfall inches (cm)	14.2 (36)	14.8 (38)	9.4 (24)	1.1 (2.8)	0.0 (0.0)	0.0 (0.0)	0.0 (0.0)	0.0 (0.0)	0.0 (0.0)	0.7 (1.8)	1.4 (3.6)	10.1 (26)	51.7 (131)
Average precipitation days (≥ 0.01 in)	10.9	10.5	11.2	11.5	12.3	11.8	10.7	10.4	9.2	10.5	9.9	11.5	130.4
Average snowy days (≥ 0.1 in)	6.1	6.2	3.8	0.7	0.0	0.0	0.0	0.0	0.0	0.1	0.9	4.5	22.3
Average relative humidity (%)	63.9	63.0	60.4	58.0	63.0	67.3	68.0	70.6	72.9	69.2	68.3	68.0	66.1
Average dew point °F (°C)	13.6 (−10.2)	15.8 (−9.0)	23.4 (−4.8)	32.4 (0.2)	45.0 (7.2)	55.6 (13.1)	61.0 (16.1)	60.1 (15.6)	53.1 (11.7)	40.8 (4.9)	31.3 (−0.4)	19.8 (−6.8)	37.7 (3.1)
Mean monthly sunshine hours	169.8	176.1	213.9	228.2	258.6	273.4	293.1	269.6	223.6	199.4	139.4	139.5	2,584.6
Percentage possible sunshine	58	59	58	57	57	60	64	63	60	58	47	49	58
Average ultraviolet index	1	2	4	6	7	8	8	8	6	4	2	1	5
Source 1: NOAA (relative humidity, dew point, and sun 1961–1990)
Source 2: Weather Atlas (UV)

=== Neighborhoods ===

Neighborhoods of Springfield, Massachusetts

Springfield is divided into 17 distinct neighborhoods; in alphabetical order, they are:

- Bay: features Blunt Park. In terms of demographics, Bay is primarily African American.
- Boston Road: named for its proximity to the original Boston Post Road system, features Springfield Crossing. Primarily commercial in character, it comprises several shopping plazas designed for automobile travel.
- Brightwood: features numerous Baystate Health specialty buildings. Amputated from the rest of Springfield by the Interstate 91 elevated highway, academic suggestions are being made to reunite the neighborhood with the city.
- East Forest Park: Primarily middle class residential in character. Borders East Longmeadow, Massachusetts.
- East Springfield: features Smith & Wesson and the Performance Food Group. Residential and working-class in character.
- Forest Park: features 735 acres (3.0 km^{2}) Forest Park and the Forest Park Heights Historic District, (established 1975). Residential in character, featuring a commercial district at "The X" and an upper-class garden district surrounding Forest Park.
- Indian Orchard: features a well-defined Main Street and historic mill buildings that have become artists' spaces. Formerly a suburb of Springfield, Indian Orchard developed separately as a milltown on the Chicopee River before joining Springfield. Primarily residential in character, Indian Orchard features Lake Lorraine State Park, Hubbard Park, and weekly farmers markets.
- Liberty Heights: features Springfield's three nationally ranked hospitals: Baystate Health, Mercy Medical, and Shriner's Children's Hospital. Primarily residential and medical in character, it features a demographically diverse population. Liberty Heights includes eclectic districts like Hungry Hill and Atwater Park, and Springfield's 3rd largest park, Van Horn Park.
- The McKnight Historic District: features the Knowledge Corridor's largest array of historic, Victorian architecture, including over 900 Painted Ladies. Primarily residential in character, McKnight was the United States' first planned residential neighborhood. McKnight's commercial district is called Mason Square. Features American International College. In terms of demographics, McKnight features significant populations of African American and LGBT residents, and is home to Mason Square, named for African American philanthropist Primus P. Mason.
- Memorial Square: features the North End's commercial district.
- Metro Center: features nearly all major cultural venues in the region. Commercial, cultural, civic, and increasingly residential in character. Features the Downtown Business District, The Club Quarter—with more than 60 clubs, restaurants, and bars—numerous festivals, cultural institutions, educational institutions, and significant historic sites.
- North End: not technically a Springfield neighborhood, but rather three northern Springfield neighborhoods. Includes Brightwood, which is residential and medical in character, but cut off from the rest of the city by Interstate 91; Memorial Square, which is commercial in character; and Liberty Heights, which is medical and residential in character. In terms of demographics, the North End is predominantly Puerto Rican.
- Old Hill: features Springfield College. Residential in character. Bordering Lake Massasoit. Old Hill is primarily Latino.
- Pine Point: features the headquarters of MassMutual, a Fortune 100 company. Primarily middle-class and residential in character.
- Six Corners: features Mulberry Street in the Ridgewood Historic District (established 1977); the Lower Maple Historic District (established 1977); and the Maple Hill Historic District, (established 1977). Urban and residential in character.
- Sixteen Acres: features Western New England University and Springfield International Charter School. Suburban in character. Includes much of Springfield's post-World War II suburban architecture.
- South End: features numerous Italian–American restaurants, festivals, and landmarks. Urban and commercial in character, this neighborhood was hard hit by the June 1, 2011, tornado. Includes the Naismith Memorial Basketball Hall of Fame; however, it is separated from it by Interstate 91.
- Upper Hill: features Wesson Park. Bordering Lake Massasoit. Residential in character. Located between Springfield College and American International College.

== Demographics ==
Historical population
Year	Pop.	±%
1765	2,755	—
1790	1,574	−42.9%
1800	2,312	+46.9%
1810	2,767	+19.7%
1820	3,914	+41.5%
1830	6,784	+73.3%
1840	10,985	+61.9%
1850	11,766	+7.1%
1860	15,199	+29.2%
1870	26,703	+75.7%
1880	33,340	+24.9%
1890	44,179	+32.5%
1900	62,059	+40.5%
1910	88,926	+43.3%
1920	129,614	+45.8%
1930	149,900	+15.7%
1940	149,554	−0.2%
1950	162,399	+8.6%
1960	174,463	+7.4%
1970	163,905	−6.1%
1980	152,319	−7.1%
1990	156,983	+3.1%
2000	152,082	−3.1%
2010	153,060	+0.6%
2020	155,929	+1.9%
2024*	154,888	−0.7%
*= population estimate. Source=1765; 1790–1950; 1960-1980; 1990-2010; 2020; 2022.

Historical racial composition	2020	2010	1990	1970	1940
White	63.3%	51.8%	68.5%	87%	97.9%
—Non-Hispanic	31.2%	36.7%	63.6%	84.1%	−
Black or African American	20.9%	22.3%	19.2%	3.3%	2.1%
Hispanic or Latino (of any race)	45%	38.8%	16.9%	3.3%	−
Asian	2.7%	2.4%	1%	0.1%	−

=== 2020 census ===
Springfield, Massachusetts – Racial and ethnic composition Note: the US Census treats Hispanic/Latino as an ethnic category. This table excludes Latinos from the racial categories and assigns them to a separate category. Hispanics/Latinos may be of any race.
Race / Ethnicity (NH = Non-Hispanic)	Pop 2000	Pop 2010	Pop 2020	% 2000	% 2010	% 2020
White alone (NH)	74,291	56,248	44,046	48.85%	36.75%	28.25%
Black or African American alone (NH)	29,831	29,934	28,548	19.62%	19.56%	18.31%
Native American or Alaska Native alone (NH)	336	329	259	0.22%	0.21%	0.17%
Asian alone (NH)	2,857	3,615	4,426	1.88%	2.36%	2.84%
Pacific Islander alone (NH)	42	47	75	0.03%	0.03%	0.05%
Some Other Race alone (NH)	236	248	863	0.16%	0.16%	0.55%
Mixed Race or Multi-Racial (NH)	3,146	3,188	4,838	2.07%	2.08%	3.10%
Hispanic or Latino (any race)	41,343	59,451	72,874	27.18%	38.84%	46.74%
Total	152,082	153,060	155,929	100.00%	100.00%	100.00%

=== 2010 census ===
According to the 2010 Census, Springfield had a population of 153,060, of which 72,573 (47.4%) were male and 80,487 (52.6%) were female. 73.0% of the population were over 18 years old, and 10.9% were over 65 years old; the median age was 32.2 years. The median age for males was 30.2 years and 34.1 years for females.

According to the 2010 Census, there were 61,706 housing units in Springfield, of which 56,752 were occupied. This was the highest average of home occupancy among the four distinct Western New England metropolises (the other three being Hartford, New Haven, and Bridgeport, Connecticut). Also as of 2010, Springfield features the highest average homeowner occupancy ratio among the four Western New England metropolises at 50%—73,232 Springfielders live in owner-occupied units, versus 74,111 in rental units. By comparison, as of the 2010 Census, New Haven features an owner occupancy rate of 31%; Hartford of 26%; and Bridgeport of 43%.

In terms of race and ethnicity, Springfield is 51.8% White, 22.3% Black or African American, 0.6% American Indian and Alaska Native, 2.4% Asian (1.2% Vietnamese, 0.3% Chinese, 0.2% Indian, 0.1% Cambodian, 0.1% Filipino, 0.1% Korean, 0.1% Pakistani, 0.1% Laotian), 0.1% Native Hawaiian and Other Pacific Islander, 18.0% from Some Other Race, and 4.7% from Two or More Races (1.5% White and Black or African American; 1.0% White and Some Other Race). Hispanics and Latinos of any race made up 38.8% of the population (33.2% Puerto Rican, 1.7% Dominican, 1.0% Mexican, 0.5% Guatemalan, 0.3% Cuban, 0.2% Colombian, 0.2% Spanish, 0.2% Salvadoran, 0.1% Peruvian, 0.1% Ecuadorian, 0.1% Panamanian, 0.1% Costa Rican, 0.1% Honduran). Non-Hispanic Whites were 36.7% of the population in 2010, down from 84.1% in 1970.

=== Income ===
Data is from the 2009–2013 American Community Survey 5-Year Estimates.

Rank	ZIP Code (ZCTA)	Per capita income	Median household income	Median family income	Population	Number of households
	Massachusetts	$35,763	$66,866	$84,900	6,605,058	2,530,147
1	01128	$33,573	$78,864	$86,964	2,468	964
	United States	$28,155	$53,046	$64,719	311,536,594	115,610,216
2	01129	$26,752	$61,435	$67,083	7,505	2,892
	Hampden County	$25,817	$49,094	$61,474	465,144	177,990
3	01119	$21,261	$46,055	$58,458	13,962	4,831
4	01108	$18,347	$34,064	$35,083	25,755	9,348
	Springfield	$18,133	$34,311	$39,535	153,428	55,894
5	01104	$17,307	$32,273	$39,475	23,083	8,884
6	01103	$17,095	$14,133	$17,457	2,556	1,553
7	01151	$16,169	$30,043	$28,415	9,134	3,410
8	01109	$13,938	$33,376	$36,737	31,429	9,555
9	01107	$12,440	$21,737	$29,199	11,271	3,920
10	01105	$12,137	$18,402	$21,345	12,360	4,836

=== Crime ===
In 2010, Springfield ranked 35th (and first in Massachusetts) in the United States' City Crime Rankings—its second-lowest ranking in recent years, (in 2009, it ranked 51st). Springfield's 2010 crime rating of 142 is down approximately 50% from its heights in the late 1990s and 2000s.

Although crime declined during parts of the 2010s, more recent summaries based on FBI-reported data continue to indicate that Springfield has one of the higher violent crime rates in Massachusetts. NeighborhoodScout's analysis estimates the annual chance of being a victim of violent crime in Springfield at approximately 1 in 112. Springfield is also frequently placed among the most dangerous cities in Massachusetts in various comparative reports and media rankings, alongside neighboring Holyoke, which is frequently cited in similar comparisons.

== Economy ==
Distribution of Greater Springfield NECTA Labor Force (2016)
1. Nat'l resources & mining (1.00%)
2. Construction (5.00%)
3. Manufacturing (10.0%)
4. Trade, transportation & utilities (18.0%)
5. Information (2.00%)
6. Finance & real estate (6.00%)
7. Professional & business services (8.00%)
8. Educational & health services (33.0%)
9. Leisure & hospitality (9.00%)
10. Other services (4.00%)
11. Government (4.00%)

Top Springfield companies for 2018 (ranked by revenues) with City and U.S. ranks Source: Fortune 500
Spfld.	Corporation	US	Revenue (in millions)
1	MassMutual	93	$33,495.4
2	Eversource Energy	364	$7,752
Top City Employers; Source: MA Executive Office of Labor and Workforce Development
Rank	Company/Organization
1	Baystate Medical Center
2	Smith & Wesson
3	General Dynamics
4	MassMutual
5	Mercy Medical Center
6	U.S. Postal Service
7	Big Y Foods
8	Massachusetts Trial Court
9	Springfield Republican
10	Springfield College

Springfield's vicinity to both Boston and New York City lends it a location well suited for distribution, and in the past this has played a significant role in its economy. For this reason in the early 20th century it was the largest producer in New England of commercially produced cakes and pastries, and among the largest in bread—with one 1926 estimate of 1.4 million loaves of bread and 14 million breakfast rolls produced in the city on a weekly basis.

Today Springfield's top five industries (in order, by number of workers) are: Education and Health Services; Trade and Transportation; Manufacturing; Tourism and Hospitality; and Professional & Business Services. Springfield is considered to have a "mature economy", which protects the city to a degree during recessions and inhibits it somewhat during bubbles. Springfield is considered to have one of America's top emerging multi-cultural markets—the city features a 33% Latino population with buying power that has increased over 295% from 1990 to 2006. As of 2006, more than 60% of Hispanic Springfielders had arrived in the city since 1986.

With 25 universities and colleges within a 15-mile (24 km) radius from Springfield, including several universities and liberal arts colleges, and more than six institutions within the city itself, the Hartford–Springfield metropolitan area has been dubbed the Knowledge Corridor by regional educators, civic authorities, and businessmen—touting its 32 universities and liberal arts colleges, numerous highly regarded hospitals, and nearly 120,000 students. The Knowledge Corridor universities and colleges provide the region with an educated workforce, which yields a yearly GDP of over $100 billion—more than at least 16 U.S. States. Hartford–Springfield has become home to a number of biotech firms and high-speed computing centers. As of 2009 Springfield ranks as the 24th most important high-tech center in the United States with approximately 14,000 high-tech jobs.

In 2010, the median household income was $35,236. Median income for the family was $51,110. The per capita income was $16,863. About 21.3% of families and 26.8% of the population were below the poverty line, including 40.0% of those under age 18 and 17.5% of those age 65 or over.

=== Business headquarters and prominent companies ===
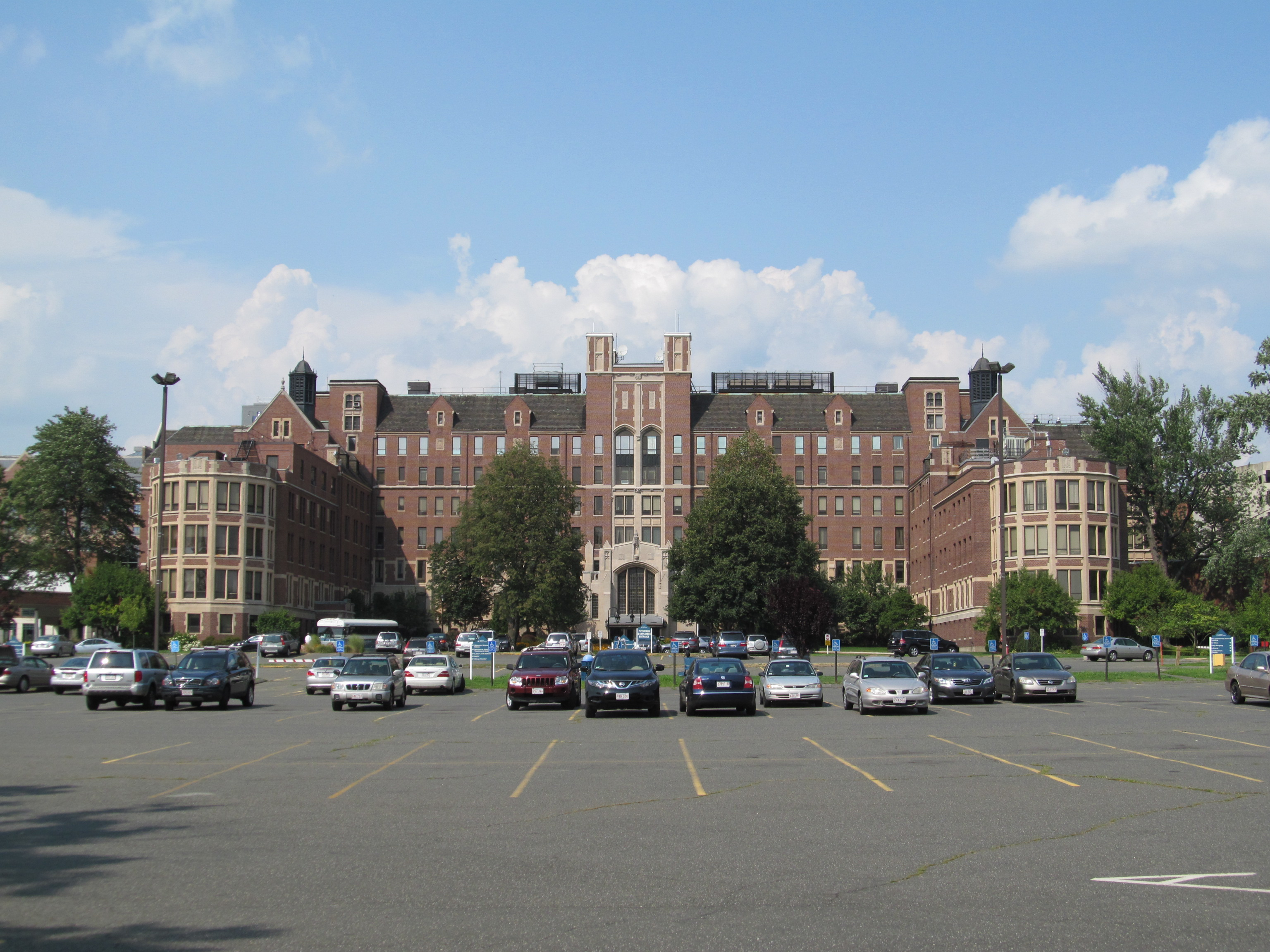
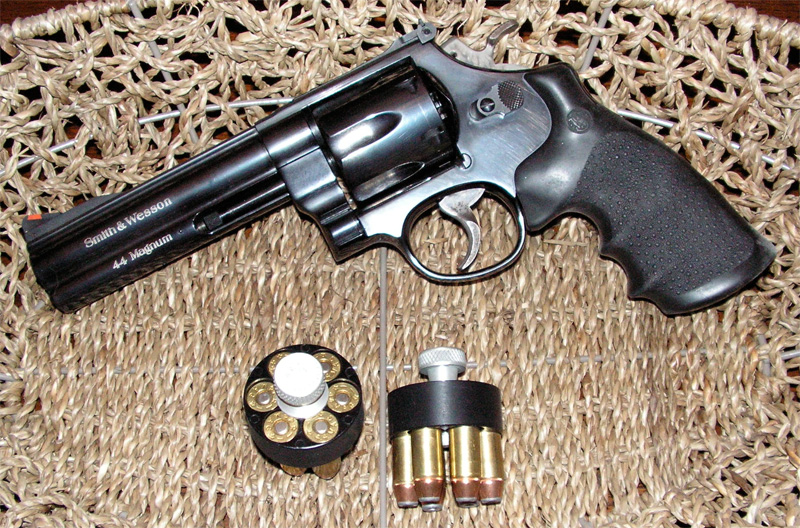

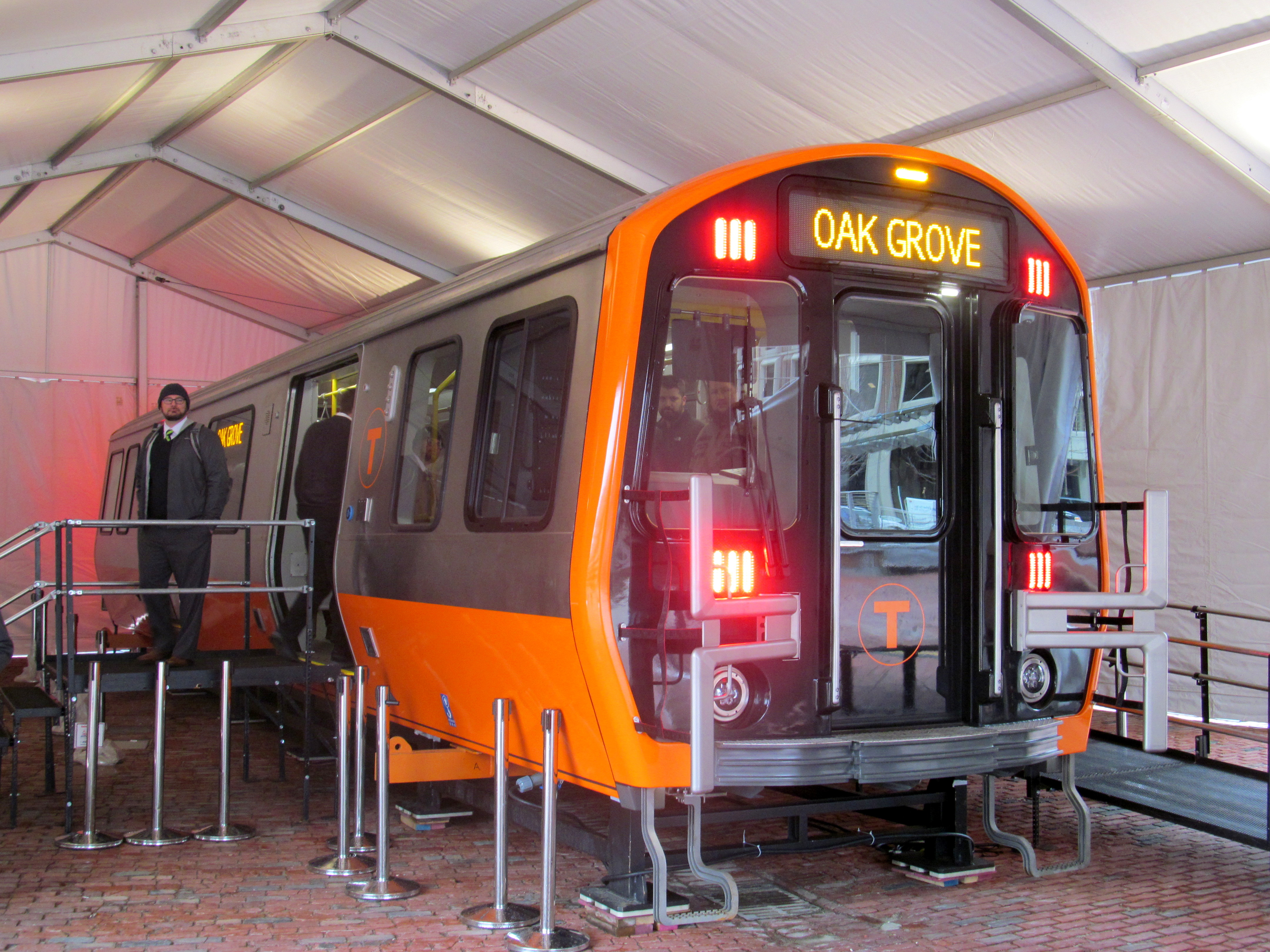
Hospital network Baystate Medical Center and gun maker Smith & Wesson are both headquartered in Springfield, and the largest employers in the city; CRRC MA began production in Springfield in 2018, assembling new Orange Line cars, as well as filling rail-car contracts for other US cities, including Los Angeles and Philadelphia.

The City of Springfield is the economic center of Western Massachusetts. It features the Pioneer Valley's largest concentration of retail, manufacturing, entertainment, banking, legal, and medical groups. Springfield is home to the Commonwealth of Massachusetts' largest Fortune 100 company, MassMutual Financial Group. It is also home to the world's largest producer of handguns, Smith & Wesson, founded in 1852. It is home to Merriam Webster, the first and most widely read American–English dictionary, founded in 1806.

Springfield is also home to the Commonwealth of Massachusetts' third largest employer, Baystate Health, with over 10,000 employees. Baystate is the western campus of Tufts University School of Medicine. Baystate Health is in the midst of a $300 million addition; nicknamed "The Hospital of the Future", it is the largest construction project in New England. In addition to Baystate, Springfield features two other nationally ranked hospitals; Mercy Medical, run by The Sisters of Providence, and Shriners Hospital for Children. The following companies maintain their headquarters in Springfield:

- The American Hockey League: the primary development league for the NHL.
- Baystate Health: Largest employer and healthcare provider in Western Massachusetts; 3rd largest employer in Massachusetts, constructing the $300 million "Hospital of the Future".
- Big Y: a regional supermarket chain that was founded in nearby Chicopee, but is now headquartered in Springfield. Big Y operates more than 50 supermarkets throughout Massachusetts and Connecticut.
- Breck Shampoo: Founded in Springfield in 1936.
- Health New England
- Massachusetts Mutual Life Insurance Company: Founded in 1851. MassMutual is the second largest Fortune 100 company based in Massachusetts (2010 list). The corporate headquarters are on State Street.
- Merriam-Webster: Publisher of the original Webster Dictionary
- Peter Pan Bus Lines: Headquartered in Metro Center, Peter Pan moved its Springfield terminal and operations to Union Station when renovations were completed in 2017.
- Smith & Wesson: Founded in 1852, Smith & Wesson is America's largest producer of handguns. The company maintained its corporate headquarters on Roosevelt Avenue in East Springfield until 2023, when it was moved to Maryville, Tennessee. The firm planned to retain many jobs in Massachusetts.

=== Former companies ===
With a history spanning nearly four centuries, Springfield has been home to a number of legacy companies that were household names, including:

- Forbes & Wallace: Regional department store, closed in 1974
- Friendly Ice Cream Corporation: Founded in Springfield, headquartered in the Springfield suburb of Wilbraham, Massachusetts.
- Good Housekeeping: Founded in Holyoke in 1885, and published in Springfield from 1887 to 1911 before being moved to New York City with its purchase by the Hearst Corporation.
- Indian Motocycle Manufacturing Company: America's first motorcycle brand, was founded by George M. Hendee and C. Oscar Hedström in Springfield in 1901
- Milton Bradley Company: American game company established in 1860. Headquartered in Springfield until its relocation to suburban East Longmeadow, Massachusetts.
- Monarch Insurance: Founded in Springfield in 1901, filed for bankruptcy in 1991, soon after completing Springfield's tallest skyscraper, Monarch Place.
- Rolls-Royce: Rolls-Royce of America Inc. was formed in 1919 to meet the growing U.S. luxury car market. A manufacturing plant was set up on Hendee Street in Springfield, Massachusetts, at the former 'American Wire Wheel Company' building. Over the years, the factory's 1,200 employees produced 1,703 Silver Ghosts and 1,241 Phantoms, with the first Silver Ghost chassis finished in 1921. The 1929 stock market crash led to the plant's closure in 1931. Springfield is the only place outside Britain where Rolls-Royce luxury cars have ever been built.
- Sheraton Hotels and Resorts: founded in Springfield in 1937 with the purchase of The Stonehaven Hotel, and later the Hotel Kimball.
- Springfield Armory: Founded by George Washington in 1777; began production of the M1 Garand in 1936, closed by the Pentagon in 1968. The current-day Geneseo, Illinois-based Springfield Armory, Inc. has no presence in Springfield outside licensing the trademark.
- Wason Manufacturing Company, one founded in 1845, large railway livery manufacturer, first mass-producer of a sleeping car; closed 1932

== Arts and culture ==
=== Cuisine ===
Springfield's mosaic of ethnic communities have long played a role in its culinary institutions, with many newer smaller restaurants and several decades-old establishments in its downtown. Among its oldest institutions are Smith's Billiards, founded in 1902, which serves Theodore's Blues, Booze, & BBQ, a neighboring barbecue and music venue since 1979, recognized as the "Best Blues Club in the Country" in 2004 by the Blues Foundation. Other venues include The Student Prince Cafe, a long-running German restaurant at its downtown location since 1935, featured on Thrillist's 2014 Editor's Choice bars, and a wide array of long-running acclaimed Italian restaurants such as Frigo's (1950), The Red Rose (1963), and Leone's (1988) and pastry shops like La Fiorentina (1947).

In recent decades, the city has also become home to a number of cuisines not found elsewhere in the region, including Cajun restaurant Chef Wayne's Big Mamou, Lebanese restaurant Nadim's Downtown, local chain Puerto Rican Bakery, and a host of other Greek, Jamaican, Mexican, and Vietnamese venues.

=== Festivals ===
- Armory Big Band Concerts: annually each summer the Springfield Armory features 1940s big band concerts.
- Basketball Hall of Fame Enshrinement Weekend: a week of events culminating in the enshrinement of new members.
- Bright Nights: Since 1995, over 600,000 lights have illuminated a 2.5-mile (4.0 km) driving tour of Forest Park every year from Thanksgiving until New Year's Day.
- Caribbean Festival: held annually in late August, featuring a parade, music, and fashion show.
- Glendi: a three-day Greek cultural festival hosted by the St. George Greek Orthodox Cathedral every September. The festival, which offers Greek food, pastries, and music, is one of the premier Greek festivals in the region.
- Hoop City Jazz Festival: an annual event.
- Mattoon Street Arts Festival.
- Our Lady of Mount Carmel Society Festival: a mid-July celebration of Italian feast days in Springfield's South End, featuring food and a parade.
- Parade of Big Balloons: a Thanksgiving parade featuring a 75-foot (23 m) inflatable "Cat in the Hat", large balloons, bands, and marching contingents Springfield's Metro Center.
- Pioneer Valley Jewish Film Festival: each spring, featuring two weeks of films, guest speakers, and events related to Jewish culture.
- Springfield Pride: Springfield Pride Week was held in June 2011. The first Pride parade was held in June 2022.
- Star Spangled Springfield: an Independence Day celebration and fireworks display.
- Stearns Square Concert Series, and Bike Nights: annually from June through September featuring live music at Stearns Square. Bike Nights coincides with the concerts, and is an event for motorcyclists.
- World's Largest Pancake Breakfast: annually, near the city's founding date of May 14, Springfield attempts to break the Guinness world record for largest number of pancakes served.

=== Museums ===
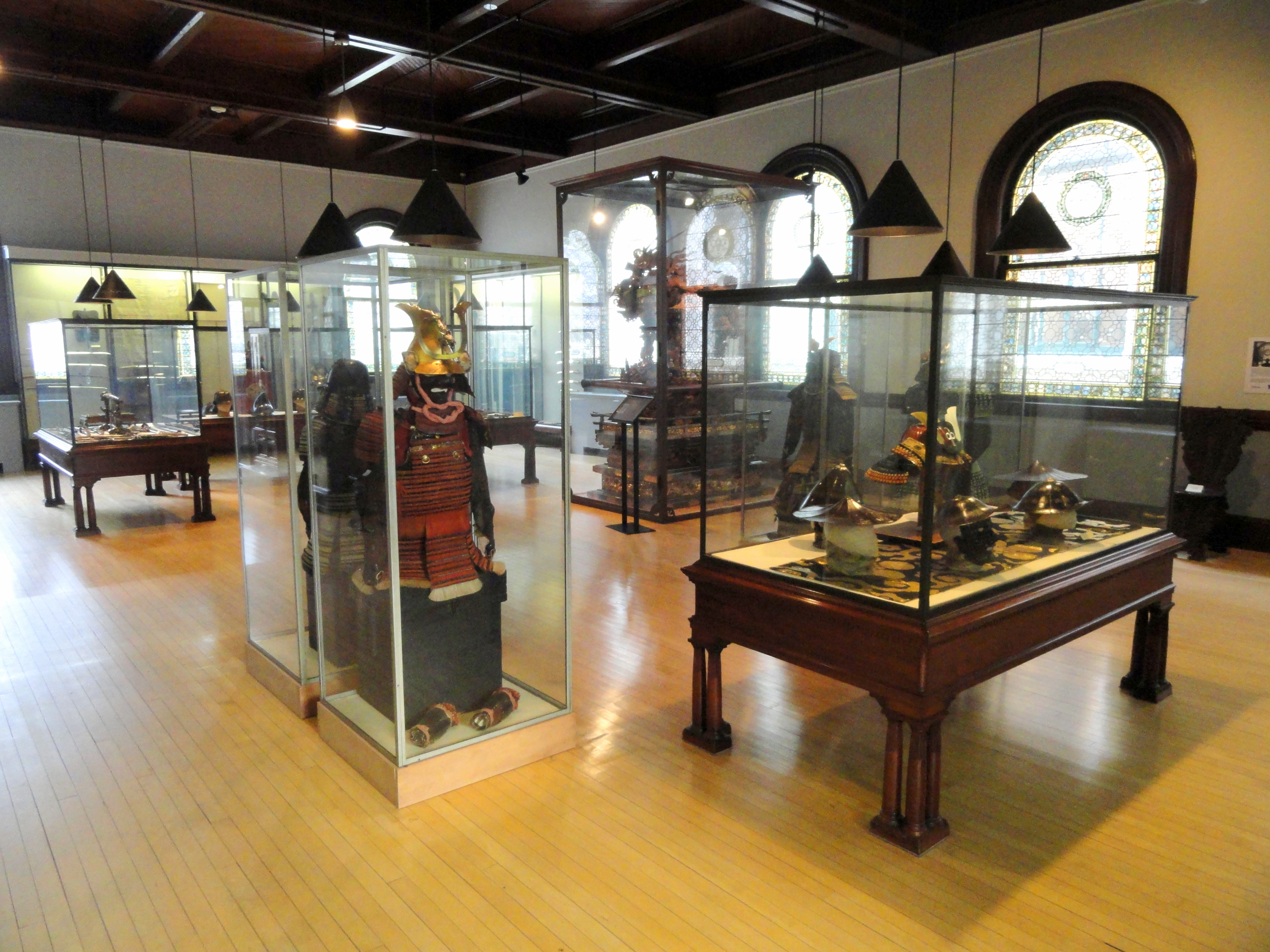
Edo period Japanese armor at the George Walter Vincent Smith Art Museum

Springfield is home to five distinct museums at the Quadrangle, along with the ornate Springfield City Library—an architecturally significant example of the City Beautiful movement. The Quadrangle's five distinct collections include the Dr. Seuss National Memorial Sculpture Garden; the largest collection of Chinese cloisonne outside of China; and the original casting of Augustus Saint Gaudens's most famous sculpture, Puritan.

The Quadrangle's five museums are the Museum of Fine Arts, which features a large Impressionist collection; the George Walter Vincent Smith Art Museum, a collection of Asian curiosities; the Springfield Science Museum, which features a life-size Tyrannosaurus Rex, an aquarium and the first American-made planetarium, designed and built (1937) by Frank Korkosz; the Amazing World of Dr. Seuss Museum, as Springfield is the birthplace of Theodor Geisel; and the Lyman and Merrie Wood Museum of Springfield History, a museum about the multi-faceted city.

U.S. Model 1842 musket among other historically firearms display at Springfield Armory National Museum

The Connecticut Valley Historical Museum was one of the Quadrangle's five museums until 2009.

In 2017 the Amazing World of Dr. Seuss Museum opened in the former location, the William Pynchon Memorial Building. The collections of the Connecticut Valley Historical Museum are now located in the Lyman and Merrie Wood Museum of Springfield History.

Springfield's Indian Orchard neighborhood is home to the RMS Titanic Historical Society's Titanic Museum, which displays a collection of rare artifacts that tell stories about the ill-fated ocean liner's passengers and crew.

=== Music ===
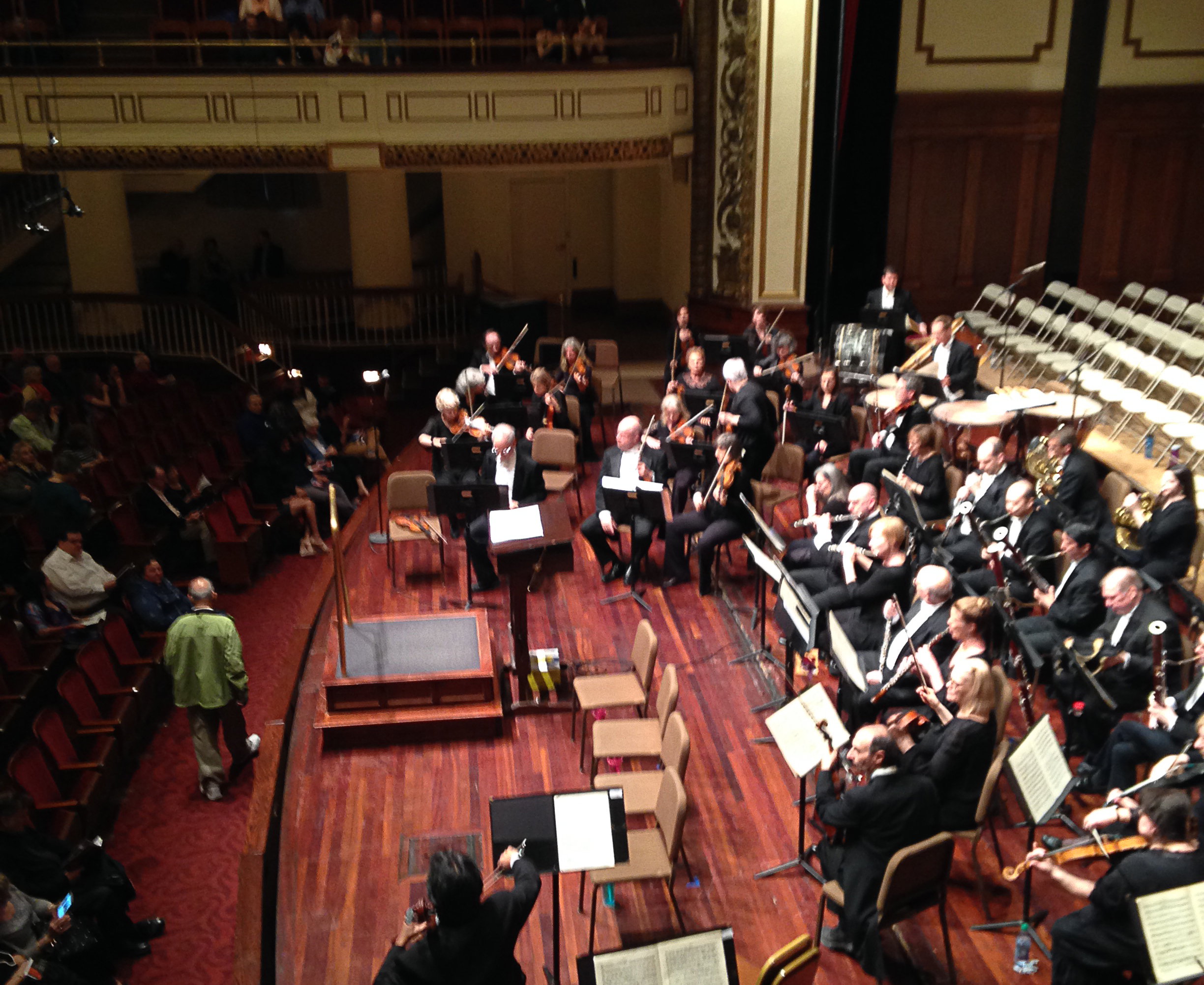
Springfield Symphony Orchestra

The Springfield Symphony Orchestra performs in Springfield Symphony Hall.

In 2011, Springfield's music scene was eclectic. It featured a notable heavy rock scene, from which the bands Gaiah, Staind, All That Remains, Shadows Fall, and The Acacia Strain rose to national prominence. Jazz and blues rival rock in popularity.

In 2010 and 2011 the Springfield-headquartered Hampden Bank sponsored the Hoops City Jazz & Art Festival, a three-day event that drew approximately 30,000 people to Metro Center to hear varieties of different jazz music—from smooth jazz, to hard bop, to New Orleans-style jazz. Headliners included Springfield great Taj Mahal, the Average White Band, and Poncho Sanchez.

=== Points of interest ===
- Basketball Hall of Fame: housed in a $47 million structure designed by Gwathmey Siegel & Associates, it is a shrine to the world's second most popular sport, basketball. Located in the city where basketball was invented, the facility—built beside the Connecticut River—spans 80,000 square feet (7,400 m^{2}) features numerous restaurants and the WMAS-FM studios. However, it is separated from Springfield's Metro Center by an eight-lane highway, Interstate 91.
- Bright Nights: during the holiday season, Forest Park hosts a lighting display.
- City Stage: features off-Broadway productions, comedians, and children's programming.
- Club Quarter: a grouping of 60 clubs, bars, and restaurants around Stearns Square, Worthington and Main Streets. Springfield's variety of nightclubs and entertainment is part of what makes it, according to Yahoo!, one of America's ten best cities for dating. LGBT and dance clubs are integrated with hip-hop, rock, jazz, and blues clubs. Thursday, Friday, and Saturday are particularly busy evenings.
- Connecticut River Walk Park: a landscaped park that snakes along the Connecticut River, offering views of the Mount Tom Range, Mount Holyoke Range, and Springfield's skyline. However, this park is separated from the city by the eight lane Interstate 91, which cuts through three riverfront neighborhoods and poses accessibility challenges. In 2010, the Urban Land Institute released a plan for Springfield's riverfront, presenting the possibility of moving Interstate 91 or otherwise altering it to allow easier access to the River Walk and the Basketball Hall of Fame.
- Court Square: a park, referred to as "Springfield's front door", it remains the city's only topographical constant since its founding in 1636. Located on Main Street and surrounded by ornate architecture, including the iconic Springfield Municipal Group, Court Square is the civic heart of Springfield. Until the 1960s, Court Square extended to the Connecticut River; however, as with Forest Park, its connection to the river was severed by the building of the Interstate 91 elevated highway.
- Dr. Seuss National Memorial Sculpture Garden: amidst the Quadrangle, there are large, bronze statues of characters from Springfield native Dr. Seuss's books.
- First Game of Basketball Sculpture: located directly on the site of the first game of basketball, this illuminated sculpture in Springfield's Mason Square commercial district has become a site of pilgrimage for basketball fans from around the world.
- Forest Park: nearly the same size as Central Park at 735 acres (297.4 ha), it features the Zoo at Forest Park; the 31 acres (12.5 ha) Porter Lake; numerous playgrounds; a formal rose garden; 38 tennis courts; a skating arena; numerous basketball and bocce courts; lawn bowling fields; Victorian promenades and water gardens; tree groves; baseball diamonds; numerous statues; an aquatic park; and the Barney Carriage House, where many weddings take place. Contrary to popular belief, the park was not designed by Fredrick Law Olmsted.
- King Philip's Stockade: a historic, city park where in 1675, the Pocumtuc Indians—organized by Chief Metacomet, also known as King Philip—initiated the Attack on Springfield during King Philip's War. During the attack, approximately 75% of the city was burned.
- MassMutual Center: formerly known as the Springfield Civic Center, this 8,000-seat arena and convention center received a $71 million renovation in 2003–2005. Located across from historic Court Square in Metro Center, the arena houses the American Hockey League's Springfield Thunderbirds. The venue also attracts big-name concert tours. In the past, it has hosted concerts by Nirvana, Pearl Jam, Van Halen, Marilyn Manson, The Eagles, and Bob Dylan, among many others.
- Mulberry Street: the street featuring the house that inspired Dr. Seuss's first children's book, the classic And to Think That I Saw It on Mulberry Street.
- The Puritan: a famous statue designed by Augustus Saint-Gaudens depicting Deacon Samuel Chapin, an early settler of Springfield. Originally located in Stearns Square, it has been located in Merrick Park in the Quadrangle for over 100 years and become a symbol of Springfield.
- The Quadrangle: a campus of five museums surrounding the Dr. Seuss National Memorial Sculpture Garden. It includes the Museum of Fine Arts, known for its Impressionist and Dutch Renaissance collections, as well as its collection of American masters, including works by Springfielder James McNeill Whistler. The Springfield Science Museum features the United States' first planetarium (built 1931), and a large dinosaur exhibit. The George Walter Vincent Smith Art Museum is known worldwide for housing the largest collection of Chinese cloisonné outside of China; it also features exotic curiosities like Asian suits of armor, and a collection of marble busts. The Quadrangle also features two regional history museums: the Connecticut Valley Historical Society, which tells the story of "The Great River" and its people, and the new Museum of Springfield History, which showcases the innovations that make Springfield "The City of Progress" during the abolitionist period and Industrial Revolution, which includes the first American–English dictionary, the first gasoline-powered car, the first successful motorcycle company, the first modern fire engine, and dozens of other firsts (see below for a more complete list).
- St. John's Congregational Church: founded in 1844 as the Sanford Street "Free Church", St. John's Congregational Church is a predominately black church that played a pivotal role in the abolitionist movement. While living in Springfield, John Brown attended services here from 1846 to 1850, and as of 2011, the church still displays John Brown's Bible. It was at this church where John Brown met Frederick Douglass, Sojourner Truth, and other prominent abolitionists—and where he later founded the militant League of Gileadites in response to the Fugitive Slave Act. As of 2011, St. John's remains one of the most prominent, predominately black congregations in the Northeastern United States.
- St. Michael's Cathedral: beside the Quadrangle, this elegant Catholic Church is the seat of the Diocese of Greater Springfield.
- Stacy Building: the location where, in 1892–1893, the Duryea Brothers built the first, American gasoline-powered car, which in 1895 won the first automobile race in Chicago, Illinois. A model of the Duryea Brothers' first car sits in a tree-shaded park beside the historic location, amidst the restaurants and bars of the Club Quarter.
- Six Flags New England: located 1 mile (1.6 km) west of Springfield's South End in Agawam, this amusement park is the largest in the Northeast and features a roller coaster, Superman the Ride.
- The Springfield Armory National Historic Site: founded by General George Washington and Henry Knox in 1777; the site of Shays' Rebellion in 1787, which led directly to the U.S. Constitutional Convention; the site of numerous technological innovations including the manufacturing advances known as interchangeable parts, the assembly line, and mass production; and the producer of the United States Military's firearms from 1794 to 1968, when the Armory was controversially shut down by Defense Secretary Robert McNamara. Today, it is a National Historic Site, and features a museum that includes one of the world's largest collections of firearms.
- Springfield Cemetery: opened in 1841 and located in the heart of the city, it is designed in the scenic rural cemetery tradition. The cemetery is the final resting place of many pioneer settlers and noted individuals from Springfield and the region.
- Symphony Hall: dedicated in 1913 by President William Howard Taft as part of the Springfield Municipal Group, Springfield Symphony Hall features "perfect acoustics". It is home to the Springfield Symphony Orchestra, and also hosts Broadway touring productions.
- Stearns Square: designed by the artistic team of Stanford White and Augustus Saint-Gaudens in 1897, this small park is the center of Springfield's Club Quarter. It features ornate architectural and sculptural details from the original team's design; however, most of those were meant to accompany The Puritan, and thus moved to storage. Stearns Square hosts a large motorcycle gathering each Thursday evening, and is the site of a summer concert series.

=== Architecture ===
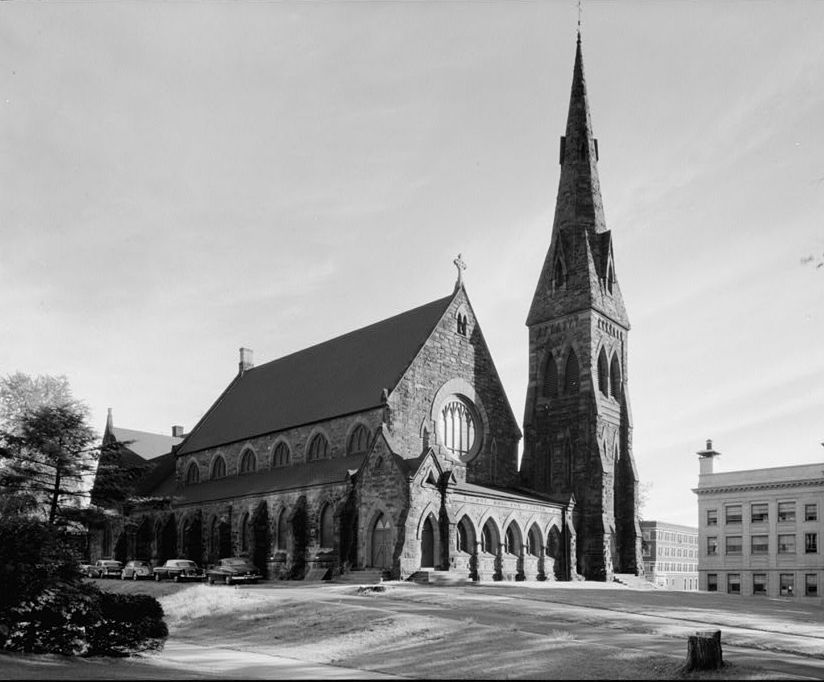
Unity Church (1869), the first commission of architect H. H. Richardson; demolished 1961.

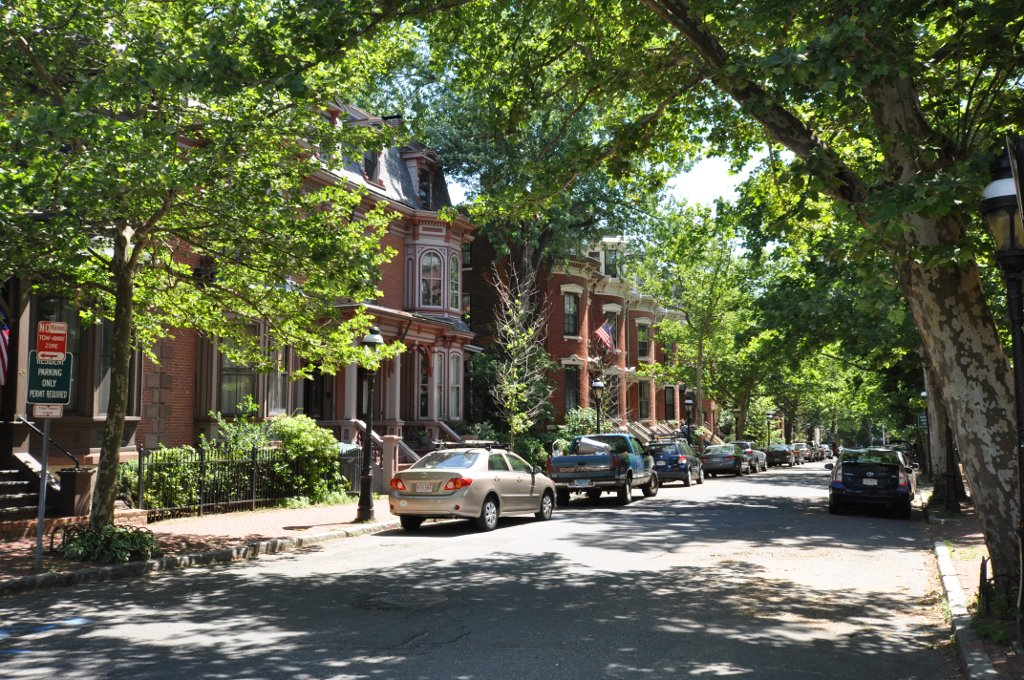
Victorian-era rowhouses

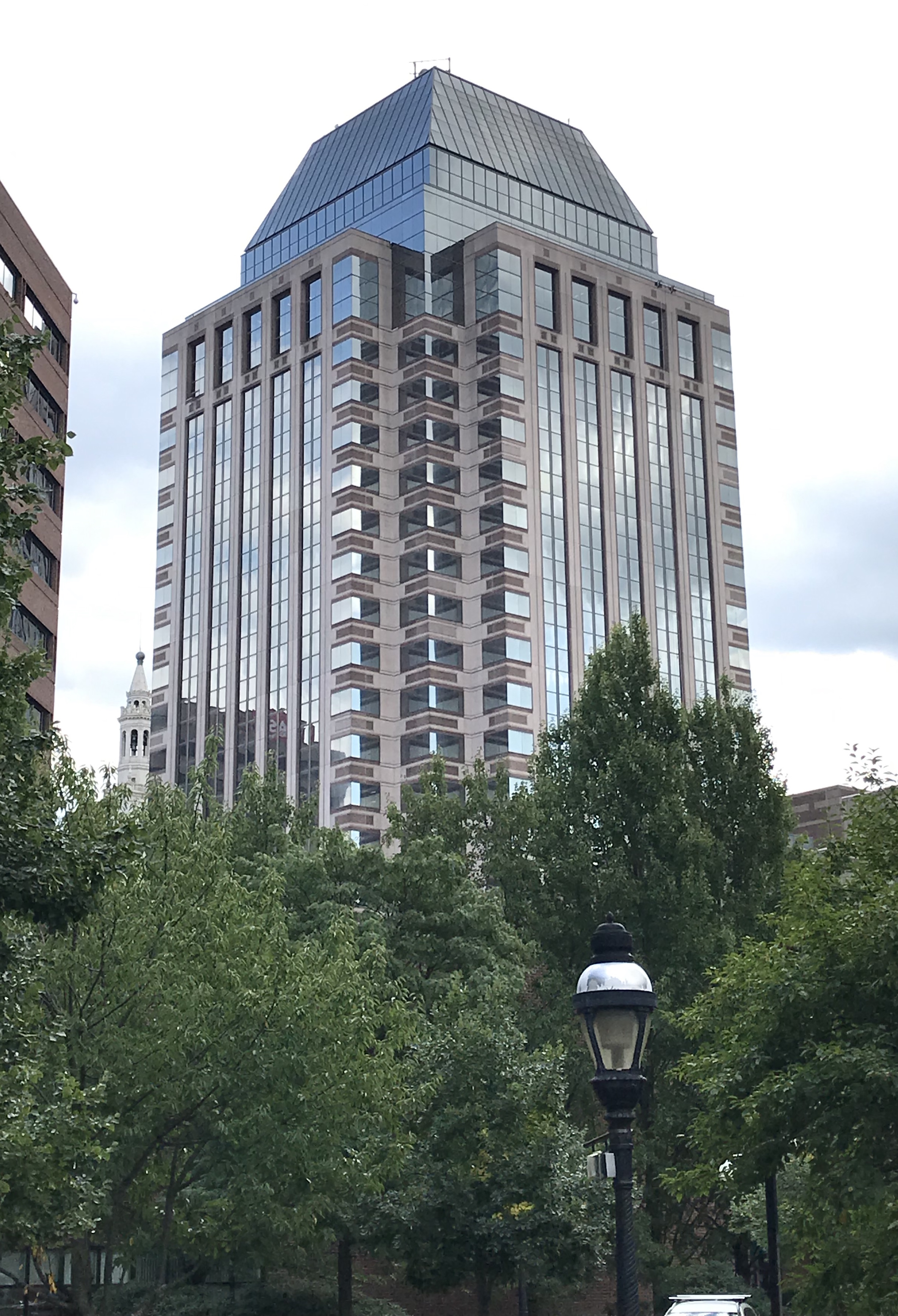
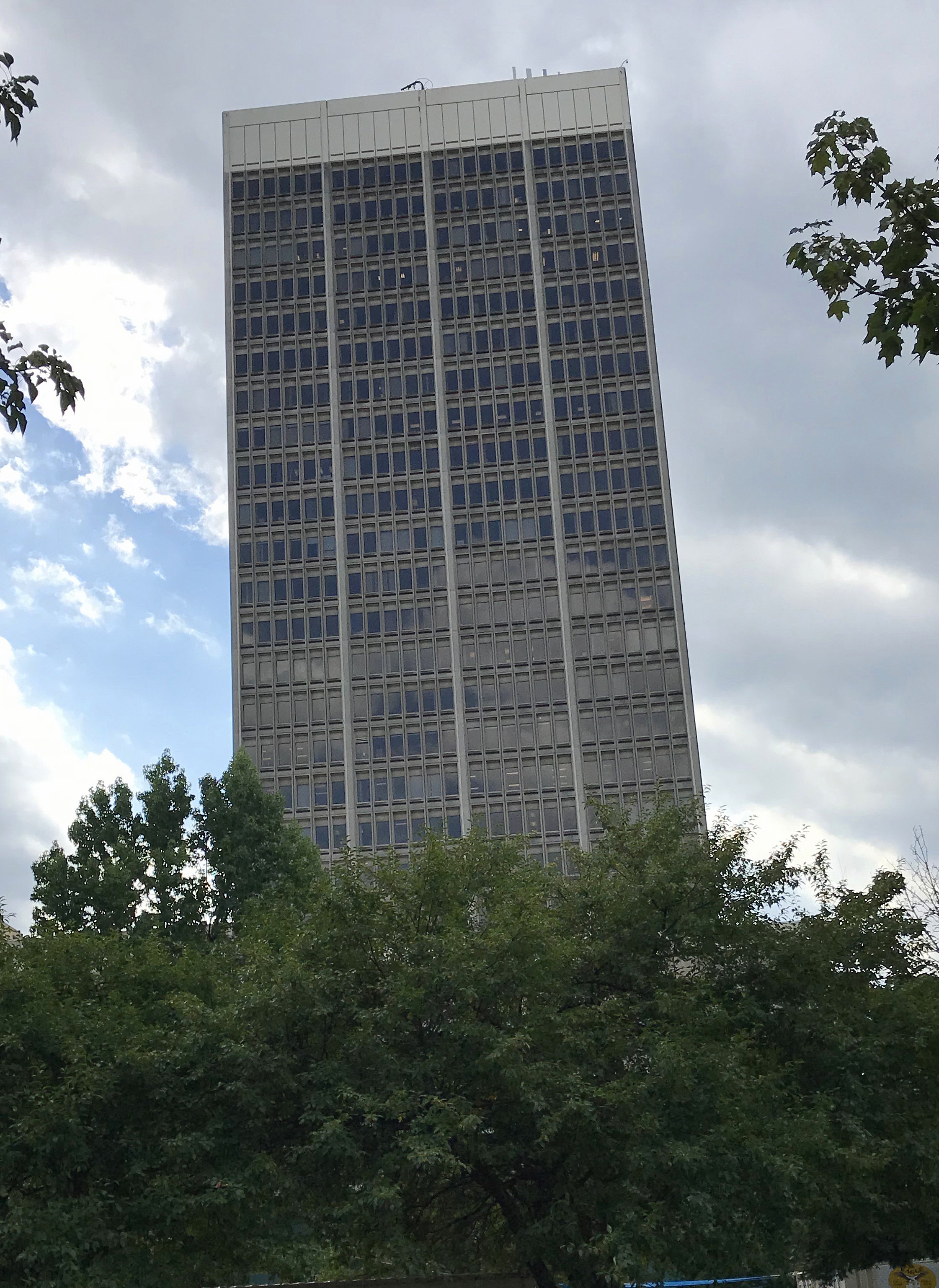
Monarch Place (left); Tower Square (right), also known as the MassMutual Tower

In addition to its nickname The City of Firsts, Springfield is known as The City of Homes for its attractive architecture, which differentiates it from most medium-size, Northeastern American cities. Most of Springfield's housing stock consists of Victorian "Painted Ladies" (similar to those found in San Francisco); however, Springfield also features Gilded Age mansions, urban condominiums buildings, brick apartment blocks, and more suburban post-World War II architecture (in the Sixteen Acres and Pine Point neighborhoods). While Springfield's architecture is attractive, much of its built-environment stems from the 19th and early 20th centuries when the city experienced a period of "intense and concentrated prosperity"—today, its Victorian architecture can be found in various states of rehabilitation and disrepair. As of 2011, Springfield's housing prices are considerably lower than nearby New England cities which do not feature such intricate architecture.

In Metro Center, stands the two prominent skyscrapers, Tower Square, and Monarch Place, the latter of which is the tallest building in Massachusetts outside of Boston. Many of the city's Victorian buildings including former hotels, factories, and other institutions have been converted into apartment buildings and luxury condominiums. For example, Springfield's ornate Classical High School (235 State Street), with its immense Victorian atrium—where Dr. Seuss, Timothy Leary, and Taj Mahal all went to high school—is now a luxury condominium building. The Hotel Kimball, (140 Chestnut Street), which hosted several U.S. Presidents as guests and once featured the United States' first commercial radio station (WBZ), has been converted into The Kimball Towers Condominiums. The former McIntosh Shoe Company (158 Chestnut Street), one of Springfield's finest examples of the Chicago School of Architecture, has been converted into industrial-style condominiums; and the red-brick, former Milton Bradley toy factory is now Stockbridge Court Apartments (45 Willow Street). In the Ridgewood Historic District, the 1950s-futurist Mulberry House (101 Mulberry Street), is now a condominium building that features some of the finest views of Springfield.

Forest Park (and Forest Park Heights), surrounding by the 735 acres (297.4 ha) Forest Park, is a New England Garden District featuring more than 600 Victorian Painted Ladies. The McKnight National Historic District, America's first planned residential neighborhood, (1881), features more than 900 Victorian Painted Ladies, many of which have been rehabilitated by Springfield's growing LGBT community. The Old Hill, Upper Hill, and Bay neighborhoods also feature this type of architecture.

Maple High, which is architecturally (and geographically) distinct from, but often included with Springfield's economically depressed Six Corners neighborhood, was Springfield's first "Gold Coast". Many mansions from the early 19th century and later Gilded Age stand atop a bluff on Maple Street, overlooking the Connecticut River. The Ridgewood Historic district on Ridgewood and Mulberry Streets also feature historic mansions from the 19th and early 20th centuries.

Springfield—like many mid-size Northeastern cities, e.g., Hartford, Albany, and New Haven—from the 1950s to the 1970s, razed a significant number of historic commercial buildings in the name of urban renewal. In 1961, this included Unity Church, the first building designed by the young Henry Hobson Richardson. Springfield's Metro Center remains more aesthetically cohesive than many its peer cities; however, as elsewhere, the city currently features a patchwork of parking lots and grand old buildings. Current efforts are underway to improve the cohesion of Springfield's Metro Center, including the completed Main Street and State Street Corridor improvement projects, the upcoming $70 million renovation to Springfield's 1926 Union Station and the renovation of the Epiphany Tower on State Street into a new hotel. New constructions include the architecturally award-winning, $57 million Moshe Safdie-designed Federal Building on State Street.

=== Public library ===
Efforts to establish a public library began in the 1850s. In fiscal year 2008, the city of Springfield spent 1.13% ($5,321,151) of its budget on its public library—approximately $35 per person, per year ($46.12 adjusted for inflation to 2022). In fiscal year 2009, Springfield spent about 1% ($5,077,158) of its budget on the library—approximately $32 per person, per year ($42.32 adjusted for inflation to 2022). Springfield has Massachusetts' 2nd largest library circulation, behind Boston.

== Sports ==
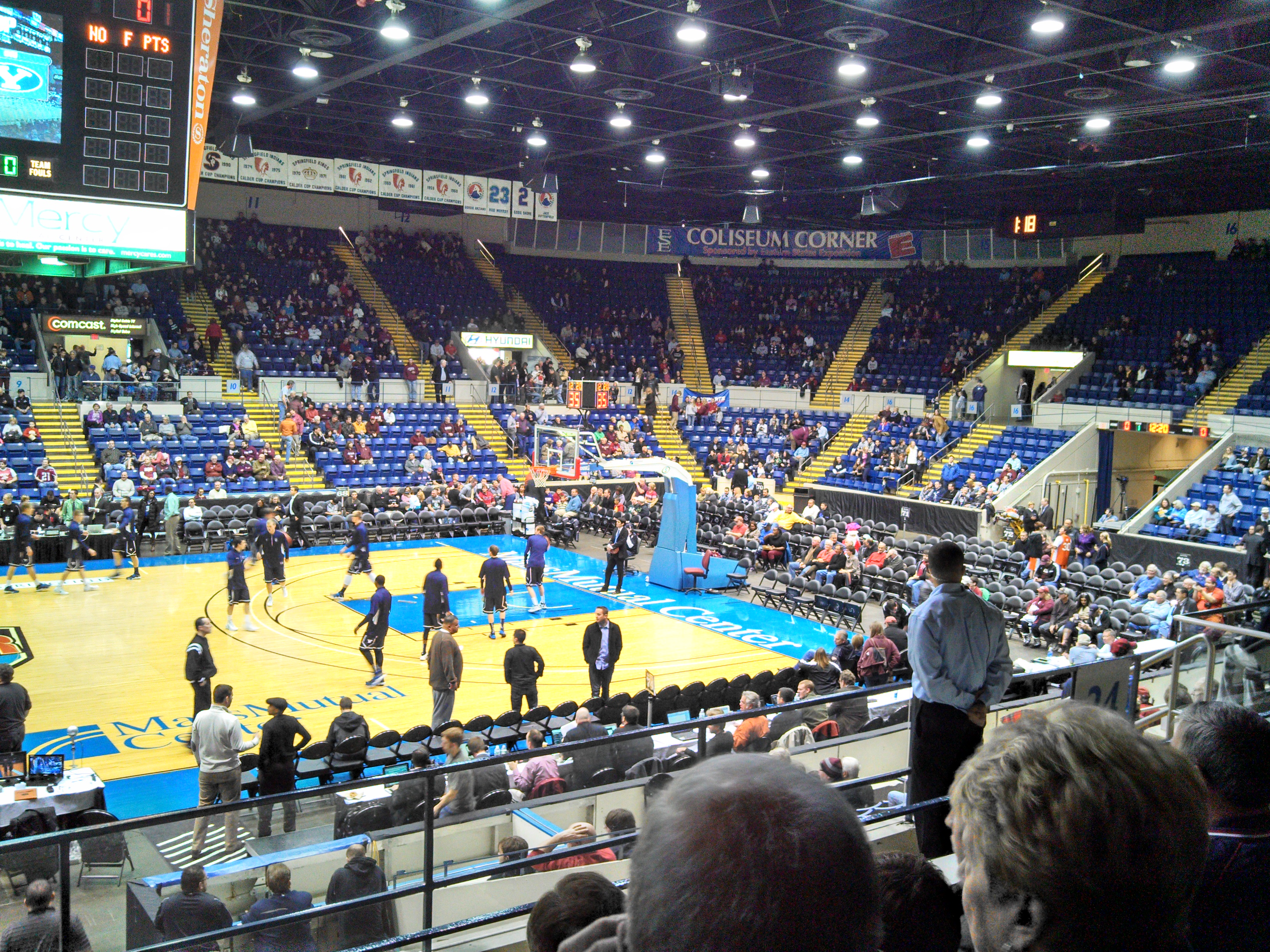
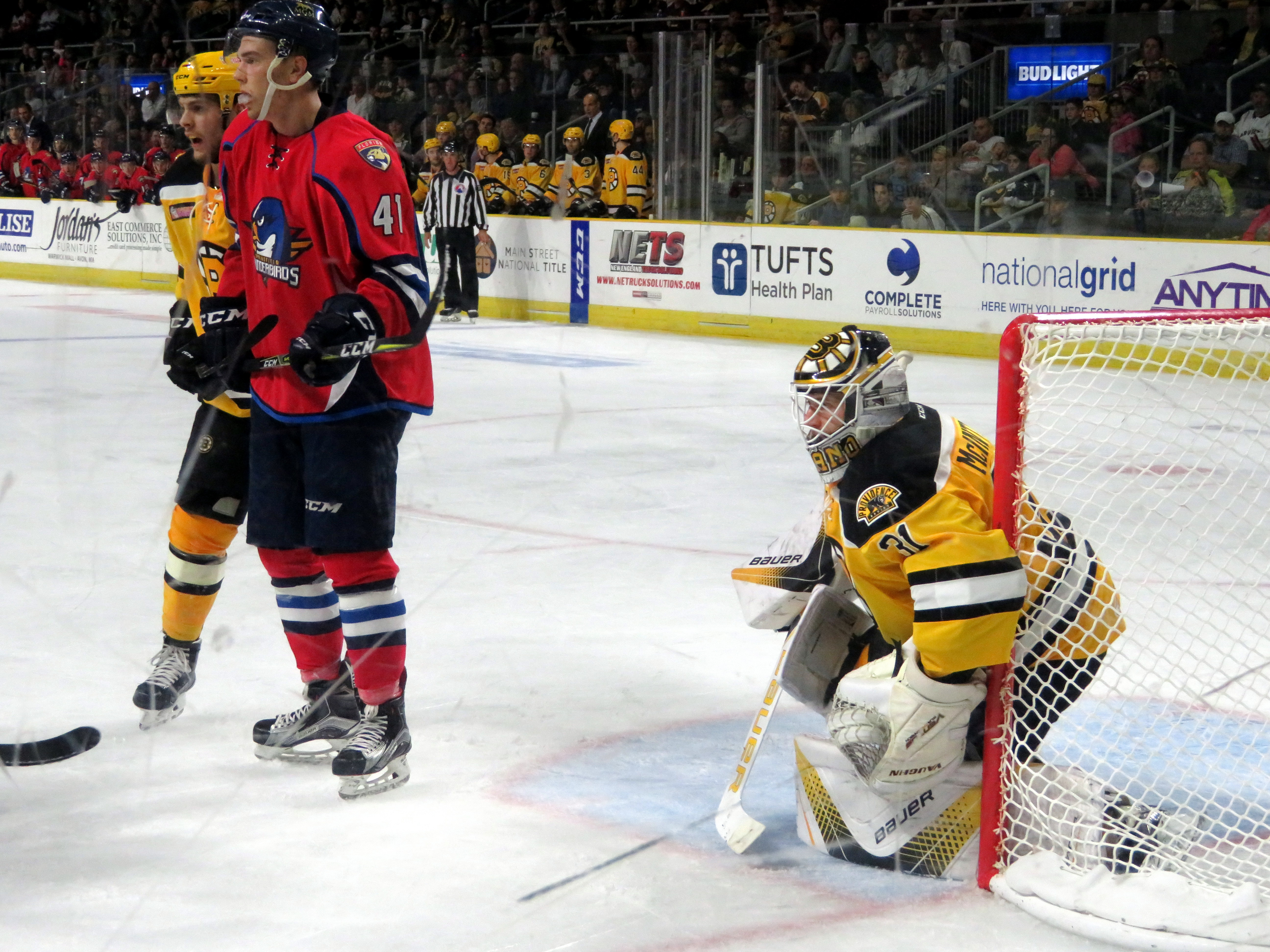
The MassMutual Center during a basketball game in 2013; Thunderbirds home game against the Providence Bruins

Besides Springfield's historic connection with basketball, the city has a rich sporting history. Volleyball was invented in the adjacent city of Holyoke, and the first exhibition match was held in 1896 at the International YMCA Training School, now known as Springfield College.

Ice hockey has been played professionally in Springfield since the 1920s, and Springfield is home to the league headquarters of the American Hockey League. The Springfield Indians of the American Hockey League (now located in Utica, New York) was the oldest minor league hockey franchise in existence. In 1994 the team relocated to Worcester and was replaced by the Springfield Falcons, who played at the MassMutual Center. The Falcons were then replaced by the Springfield Thunderbirds in 2016. For parts of two seasons (1978–1980) the NHL Hartford Whalers played in Springfield while their arena was undergoing repairs after a roof collapse. It hosted Game 1 and Game 2 of the 1978 Avco Cup Final. On the amateur level, the Junior A Springfield Olympics played for many years at the Olympia, while American International College's Yellow Jackets compete in NCAA Division I hockey.

Basketball remains a popular sport in Springfield's sporting landscape. Springfield is currently home to the Western Mass Zombies a minor league basketball team participating in the East Coast Basketball League. The Zombies in 2021 were named ECBL Mid-Atlantic Champions. Prior to the 2014–2015 season, Springfield was home to the Springfield Armor of the NBA Development League, which began play in 2009 at the MassMutual Center. Beginning in the 2011–2012 season, the Armor was the exclusive affiliate of the Brooklyn Nets. For many years, the Hall of Fame Tip-Off Classic has been the semi-official start to the college basketball season, and the NCAA Division II championships are usually held in Springfield. The Metro Atlantic Athletic Conference played its championships in Springfield from 2012 to 2014. The New England Blizzard of the ABL played its first game in Springfield, and several minor pro men's and women's teams have called the city home, including the Springfield Fame of the United States Basketball League (the league's inaugural champion in 1985) and the Springfield Hall of Famers of the Eastern Professional Basketball League.

Springfield has had professional baseball in the past. The Springfield Giants of the Single- and Double-A Eastern League played between 1957 and 1965. The team was quite successful, winning consecutive championships in 1959, 1960 and 1961, by startling coincidence the same seasons in which the Springfield Indians won three straight Calder Cup championships in hockey. The Giants played at Pynchon Park by the Connecticut River until relocating after the 1965 season. Pynchon Park's grandstands were destroyed by fire the year after in 1966. Before that time, the Springfield Cubs played in the minor league New England League from 1946 until 1949, after which the league folded; they then played in the International League until 1953. For many years before the Giants, Springfield was also a member of the Eastern League, between 1893 and 1943. In general, the team was named the Ponies, but it also carried the nicknames of "Maroons" (1895), "Green Sox" (1917), "Hampdens" (1920–1921), "Rifles (1932, 1942–1943) and "Nationals" (1939–1941). The team located closest are the Valley Blue Sox of the New England Collegiate Baseball League who play their games in nearby Holyoke, but house their team offices at 100 Congress Street in Springfield.

== Parks and recreation ==
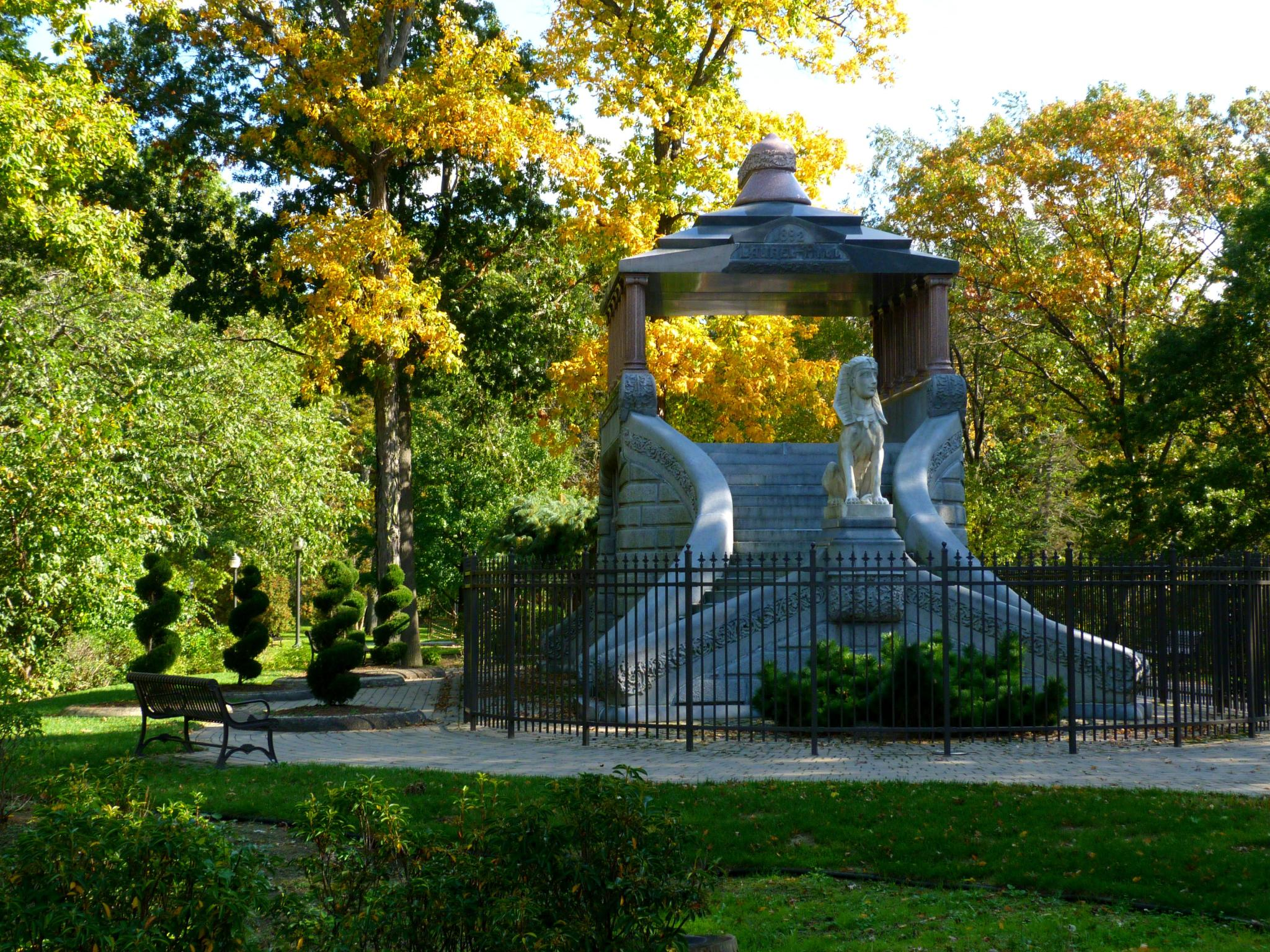
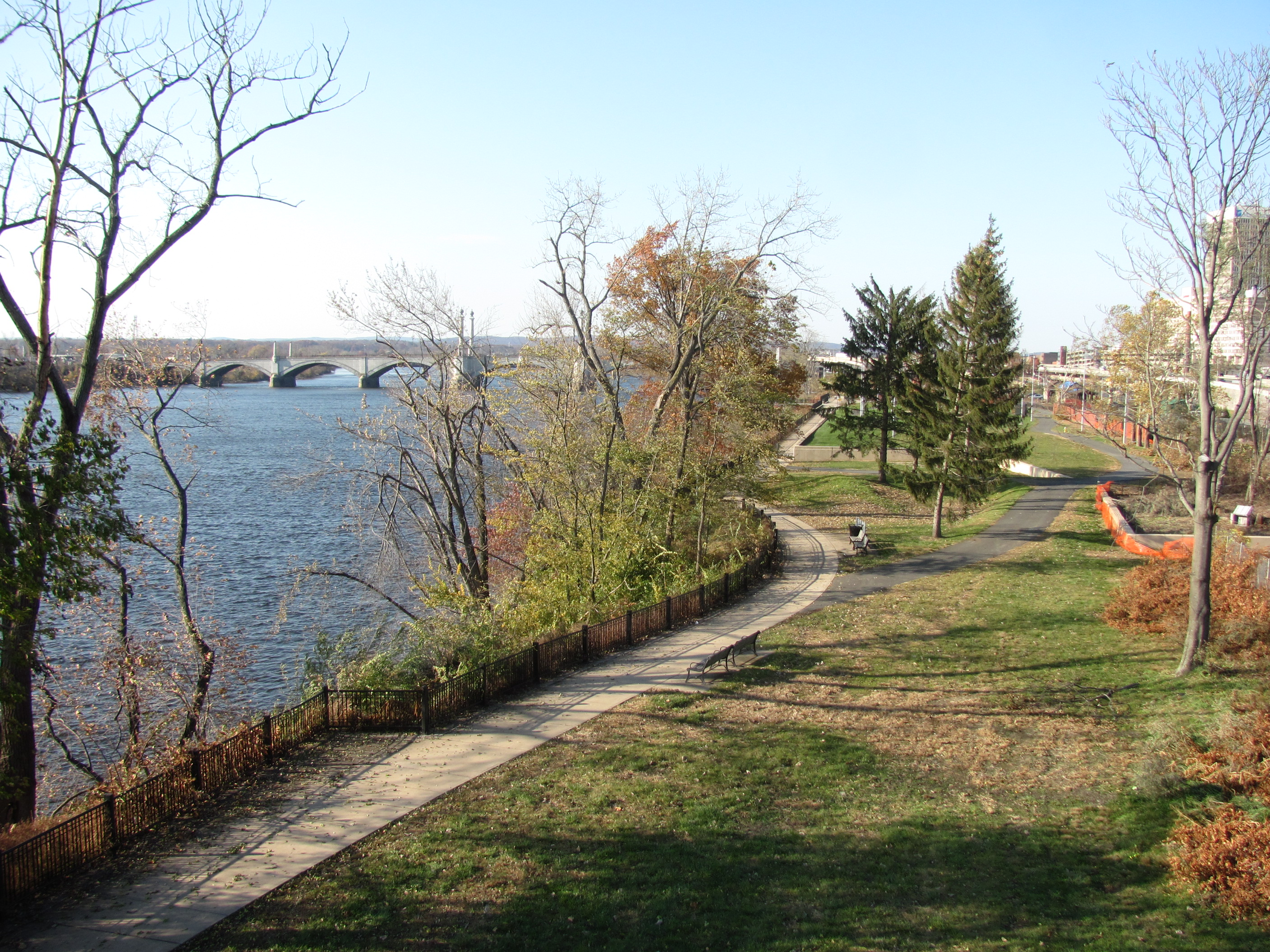
Barney Mausoleum at Forest Park; the Connecticut River Walk

In 2010, Springfield was cited as the fourth "Greenest City" in the United States—the largest city cited in the Top 10. The recognition noted Springfield's numerous parks, the purity of its drinking water, its regional recycling center, and organizations like ReStore Home Improvement Center, which salvages building materials. Springfield features over 2,400 acres (10 km^{2}) of parkland distributed among 35 urban parks, including the grand, 735 acres (297.4 ha) Forest Park. Well-known parks include the following, among others:

- Apremont Triangle Park is a triangular, pocket park in front of Springfield's historic Kimball Towers in Metro Center. Named for Springfield's 104th Infantry Regiment, which following the World War I Battle of Apremont, became the first U.S. military unit awarded for heroism by a foreign power, receiving France's highest military honor: the Croix de Guerre for bravery in combat. The same Springfield unit received the same honor again in World War II. Apremont Triangle Park, steps from both the bohemian Kimball Towers and upper-class Quadrangle-Mattoon Street Historic District offers a place to sit amidst the restaurants on the northern fringe of the Club Quarter.
- Armoury Commons is a rectangular park just south of the Springfield Armory, located at the corner of Pearl and Spring Streets in Metro Center. Renovated in 2009, Armoury Commons features several sculptures, including Pynchon Park's original sculpture. The park is often used as a place to play chess and other games.
- Connecticut River Walk Park is a narrow, landscaped park that snakes along the scenic Connecticut River for several miles. Beginning near the Basketball Hall of Fame, it features jogging trails, benches, boat docks, and plazas—all of which afford scenic vistas of the Connecticut River and Connecticut River Valley. However, Interstate 91's position, height, and ancillary structures—including a 1,756-car, below-grade parking lot (the largest in the city), and 20-foot (6 m) stone walls block all views of the Connecticut River, and all but three passages to the park from Metro Center. Despite Springfield's rating as one of the most walkable cities in the U.S., due to the poor planning of I-91, this park can be difficult to reach on foot.
- Court Square has been Springfield's one topographical constant since colonial days—it is located in Metro Center. Featuring monuments to Springfield's hero during King Philip's War of 1675, Miles Morgan; President William McKinley; and a Civil War memorial Court Square is surrounded by extraordinarily fine architecture, including H.H. Richardson's Richardsonian Romanesque Courthouse; the Springfield Municipal Group featuring the Greek Revival City Hall, Symphony Hall, and the 300-foot (91 m) Italianate Campanile; and also the 1819 reconstruction of the 1638 Old First Church. Other buildings included are the One Financial Plaza skyscraper, UMass Amherst's Urban Design Studio in the Byers Block (b. 1835); and, across Main Street, the MassMutual Center arena and convention center.
- Five Mile Pond is a Naturalist park and pond approximately 5 miles (8 km) from Springfield's Metro Center in the Pine Point neighborhood of Springfield. There are several, glacial lakes in the Five Mile Pond area, including Lake Lorraine, Loon Pond, and Long Pond. Five Mile Pond is popular with boaters.
- Forest Park is one of the United States' largest urban parks (at 735 acres (297.4 ha)) and also one of its most historically important urban parks. Amenities include the Zoo at Forest Park, which features many exotic animals; the United States' first public swimming pool (1899); numerous playgrounds; an ice-skating rink; a formal rose garden; the 31 acres (12.5 ha) Porter Lake, which features fishing and paddle-boating; 38 tennis courts; numerous basketball and bocce courts; lawn bowling fields; Victorian promenades and water gardens; dozens of hiking and walking trails; an aquatic park; numerous sculptures; and the Carriage House of Springfielder Everett Hosmer Barney, the man who invented the ice skate and popularized the roller skate during the 19th century. During the holiday season, Forest Park hosts the nationally renowned lighting display, Bright Nights. Contrary to popular belief, the park was not designed by Fredrick Law Olmsted.
- King Philip's Stockade is an historic park, famous as the site where Native Americans organized the 1675 Sack of Springfield; The Stockade features numerous picnic pavilions, excellent views of the Connecticut River Valley, and a sculpture of The Windsor Indian, who tried in vain to warn the residents of Springfield of coming danger.
- Leonardo da Vinci Park is a small greenspace (0.4 acres), located in the historically Italian South End of Springfield. It features ornamental perimeter fencing surrounding a playground. Leonardo da Vinci Park was renovated in 2009 and now features new picnic tables and playground equipment.
- Pynchon Park is an architecturally interesting brutalist-style city park, which was dedicated in 1977. It links Springfield's Metro Center with the Quadrangle cultural grouping, (the museums and sculptures sit atop a steep bluff). Mostly made of poured concrete, but featuring a waterfall, lush greenery, and fountains, Pynchon Park received numerous accolades from the American Institute of Architecture for "enhancing the quality of the urban environment in the core of the city". It features two levels and a distinctive elevator.
- Stearns Square is a rectangular park between Worthington Street and Bridge Street in Springfield's Club Quarter, located in Metro Center. Designed by the creative 'dream-team' of Stanford White and Augustus Saint-Gaudens. It was there that St. Gaudens' most famous work, The Puritan, originally stood. The Puritan has since been moved to the Quadrangle, at the corner of State and Chestnut Streets; however, White's and St. Gaudens' original fountain, bench, and turtle sculptures, all meant to complement The Puritan, remain in Stearns Square.
- Van Horn Park is a large park in the Hungry Hill section of Liberty Heights in Springfield. It features two ponds and a reservoir. The Reservoir and lower dam are not generally accessible to the public. The Main Entrance is on Armory Street near Chapin Terrace.

== Government ==
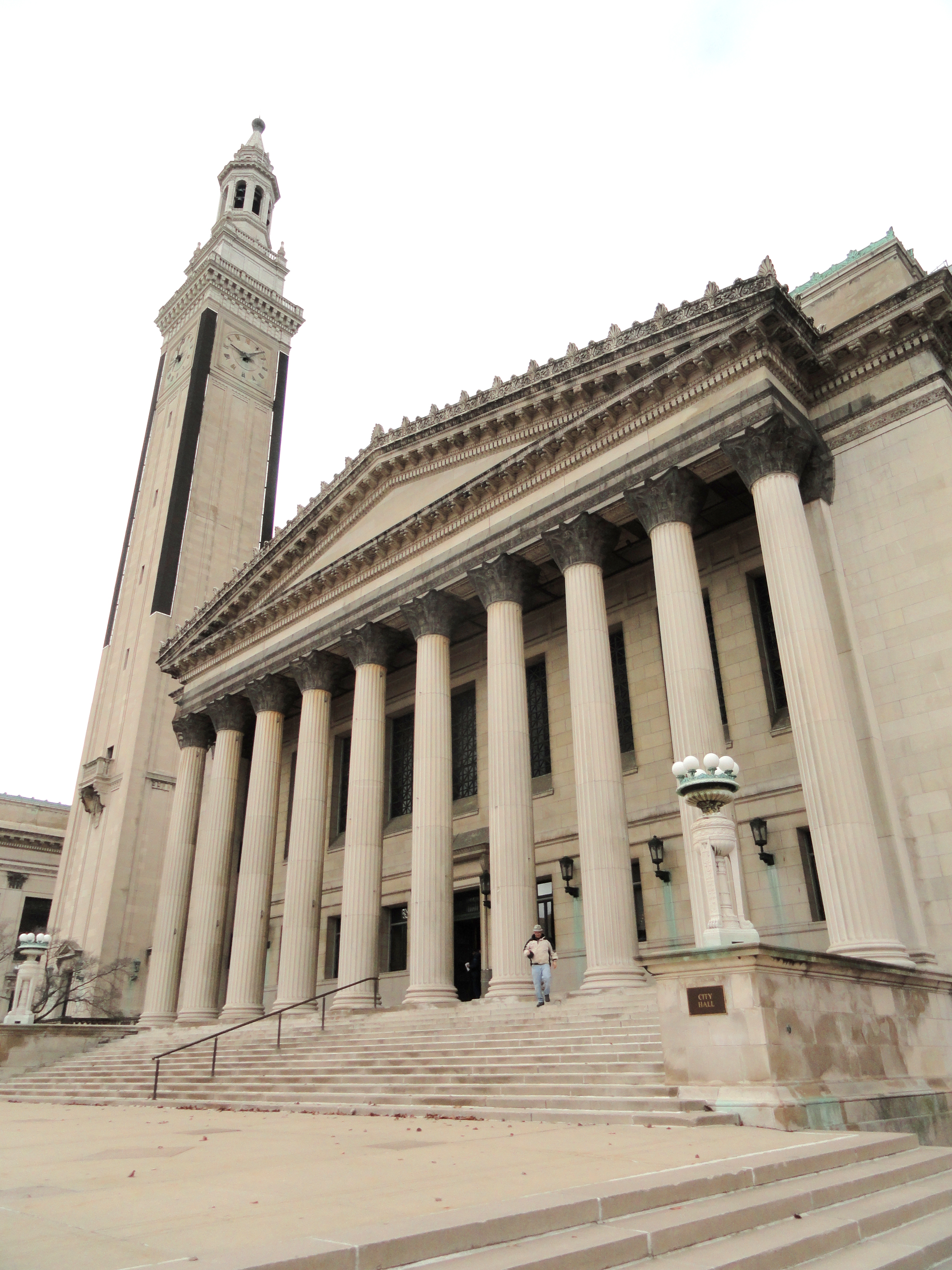
Springfield City Hall (1913)

=== City of Springfield ===
Springfield employs a strong-mayor form of city government. Springfield's mayor is Domenic J. Sarno, who has been serving since 2008.

The city's governmental bureaucracy consists of 33 departments, which administer a wide array of municipal services, e.g. police, fire, public works, parks, public health, housing, economic development, and the Springfield Public School System, New England's 2nd largest public school system.

Springfield's legislative body is its City Council, which features a mix of eight ward representatives—even though the city has more than twice that many neighborhoods, resulting in several incongruous "wards"—and five at-large city representatives, several of whom have served for well over a decade.

==== Finances ====
In 2003, the City of Springfield was on the brink of financial default, and thus taken over by a Commonwealth-appointed Finance Control Board until 2009. Disbanded in June of that year, the Control Board made great strides stabilizing Springfield's finances. While Springfield has achieved balanced budgets since 2009, the city has not enlarged its tax base, and thus many of its public works projects—which have been in the pipeline for years, some even decades—remain unfinished (e.g., repairs to Springfield's landmark Campanile). The construction of MGM Springfield, which opened in 2018, fueled a number of projects in the years leading up to and after its opening, with an estimated $3 billion of new development and infrastructure spending materializing.

Building off of the work of the Control Board, the city's finances have remained stable under Mayor Domenic J. Sarno's (2008–present) despite the Great Recession and several natural and man made disasters: June 1, 2011, tornado Springfield Tornado, Hurricane Irene, a freak October snow storm (which in some ways was more damaging than the tornado), and a large gas explosion in the downtown area in 2012. The city has recovered, however receiving a bond upgrade from Standard and Poor's Investment Services and the GFOA's Distinguished Budget Award for six consecutive years.

=== Judicial system ===
Like every other municipality in Massachusetts, Springfield has no judicial branch itself. Rather, it uses the Springfield-based state courts, which include Springfield district court and Hampden County Superior Court, both of which are based in Springfield. The Federal District Court also regularly hears cases in Springfield—now in an architecturally award-winning building on State Street, constructed in 2009.

=== Politics ===
Voter Registration and Party Enrollment as of February 2, 2025
Party	Number of Voters	Percentage
Democratic	38,655	32.53%
Republican	7,020	5.91%
Unaffiliated	71,873	60.49%
Other	460	0.39%
Total	118,827	100%

Springfield became a city on May 25, 1852, by decree of the Massachusetts Legislature, after a decade-long internal dispute that resulted in the partition of Chicopee from Springfield, and thus the loss of two fifths of the city's population.

Springfield, like all municipalities in Massachusetts, is subject to limited home rule municipal power. The current city charter, in effect since 1959, uses a "strong mayor" government with most power concentrated in the mayor, as in Boston and elsewhere. The mayor representing the city's executive branch presents the budget, appoints commissioners and department heads, and in general runs the city. The mayor is former City Councilor Domenic Sarno, elected November 6, 2007, by a margin of 52.54% to 47.18% against incumbent Charles Ryan. He took office in January 2008. In November 2009 and 2011, Sarno won reelection, albeit—in the latter case—with just 22% of eligible Springfield voters voting.

The Springfield City Council, consisting of thirteen members, is the city's legislative branch. Elected every odd numbered year, eight of its members are elected to represent "wards", which are made of (sometimes incongruous) groupings of Springfield neighborhoods, e.g. Springfield's ethnic North End neighborhoods—Memorial Square and Brightwood—share a ward with Metro Center, Springfield's downtown. Five city council members are elected at-large. The City Council passes the city's budget, holds hearings, creates departments and commissions, and amends zoning laws.

The mayor's office and city council chambers are located in city hall—part of the Municipal Group in Metro Center, Springfield. The Finance Control Board met there as well.

Springfield is heavily Democratic. In the 2020 US Presidential Election Democrat Joe Biden received 72.4 percent of the vote to Republican Donald Trump's 25.7 percent.

Presidential election results
Year	Democratic	Republican
2024	65.5% 33,329	32.0% 16,274
2020	72.4% 39,361	25.7% 13,957
2016	74.0% 40,341	20.6% 11,231
2012	79.7% 43,869	19.1% 10,515
2008	76.3% 39,516	21.9% 11,331
2004	71.3% 33,583	27.7% 13,028
2000	69.7% 29,728	24.1% 10,288
1996	70.9% 31,266	20.7% 9,110
1992	54.5% 27,302	24.3% 12,200
1988	64.5% 30,113	34.8% 16,244
1984	57.6% 29,376	42.0% 21,431
1980	51.8% 26,414	34.7% 17,694

=== Switch to ward representation ===
Springfield City Councilors 2026-2027
- Tracye Whitfield: At-Large (President)
- Jose M. Delgado: At-Large (Vice President)
- Justin Hurst: At-Large
- Kateri Walsh: At-Large
- Brian Santaniello: At-Large
- Maria Perez: Ward 1
- Michael A. Fenton: Ward 2
- Melvin Edwards: Ward 3
- Malo Brown: Ward 4
- Lavar Click-Bruce: Ward 5
- Victor Davila: Ward 6
- Gerry Martin: Ward 7
- Zaida Govan: Ward 8

In the past, efforts have been made to provide each of the city's eight wards a seat in the city council, instead of the current at-large format. There would still be some at-large seats under this format. The primary argument for this has been that City Councilors live in only four of the city's wards. An initiative to change the composition failed to pass the City Council twice. In 2007 Mayor Charles V. Ryan and City Councilor Jose Tosado proposed a home-rule amendment that would expand the council to thirteen members adding four seats to the existing nine member at large system, but allocated between eight ward and five at large seats. This home-rule petition was adopted by the City Council 8–1, and was later passed by the State Senate and House and signed by the Governor. On election day, November 6, 2007, city residents voted overwhelmingly in favor of changing the City Council and School Committee. The ballot initiative that established a new council with five at-large seats and eight ward seats passed 3–1. On November 3, 2009, Springfield held its first ward elections in 50 years.

=== State and federal representation ===
The State Representatives are Orlando Ramos, Carlos González, Bud Williams, and Angelo Puppolo. The State Senator is Adam Gomez. Springfield is part of the Eighth Massachusetts Governor's Council district and is represented by Tara Jacobs (D-North Adams).

Richard Neal represents United States House of Representatives, Massachusetts District 1, and Elizabeth Warren and Edward Markey represent Springfield in the Federal Senate.

== Education ==
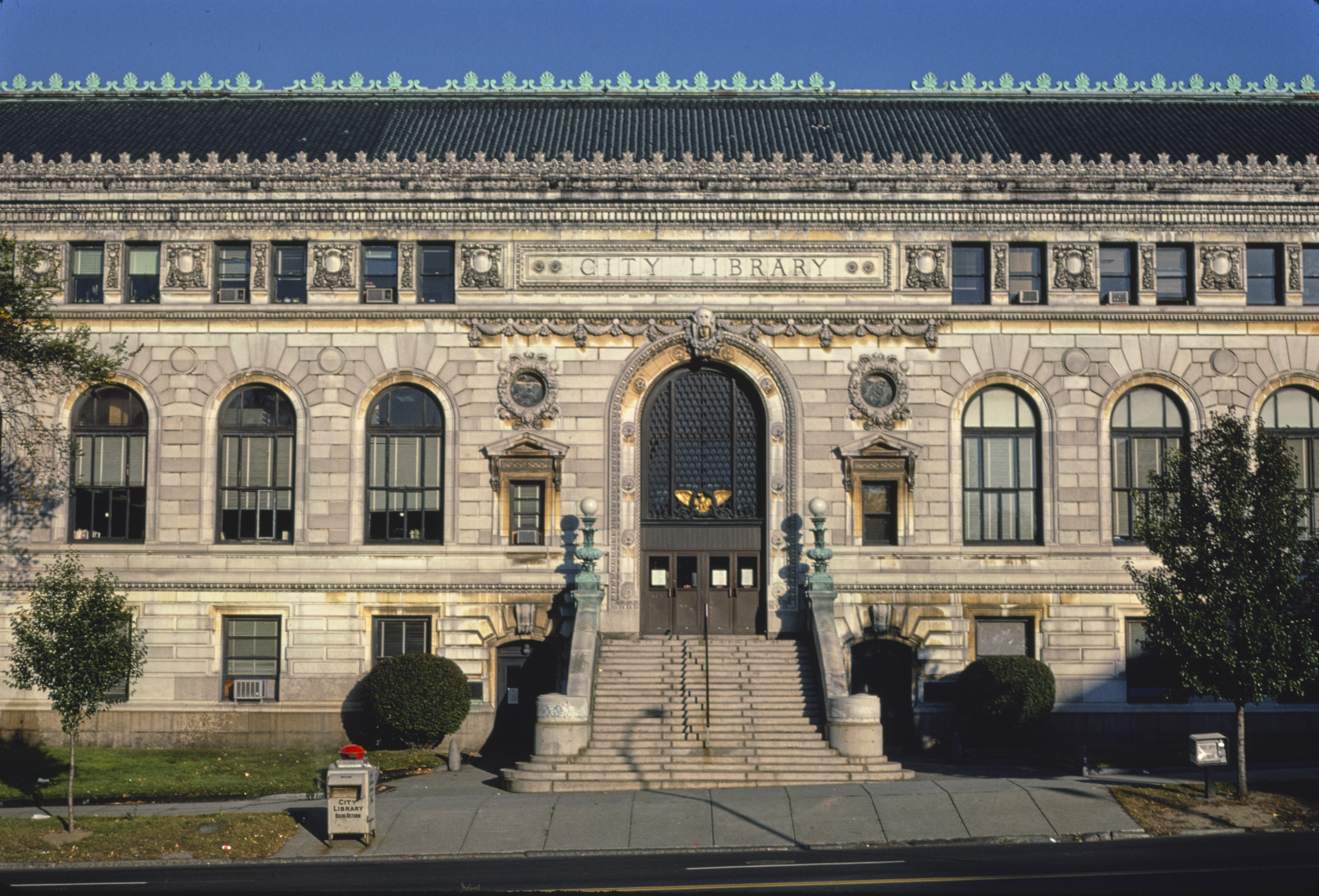
Central Branch of Springfield City Library

=== Grade schools ===
The Springfield Plan for citizenship education drew national attention in the 1940s for its efforts to combat racism.

==== Public schools (K–12) ====
Springfield has the second-largest school district in Massachusetts and in New England. It operates 38 elementary schools, eleven high schools, six middle schools (6–8), and seven specialized schools. The main high schools in the city include the High School of Commerce, Springfield Central High School, Roger L Putnam Vocational-Technical High School, and the Springfield High School of Science and Technology, better known as Sci-Tech. There are also two charter secondary schools in the City of Springfield: Springfield International Charter School (SICS), formerly SABIS International, Libertas Academy, Springfield Prep, and Phoenix Academy.

The city is required under a 1970s court order to balance schools racially, which had necessitated busing. However, since then, the city and the school's population has shifted and many of the neighborhoods are more integrated, calling into question the need for busing at all.

In June 2015, Massachusetts Governor Charlie Baker announced $3.2 million in grants to three underperforming middle schools in Springfield.

==== Private schools ====
The Roman Catholic Diocese of Springfield operated five Catholic elementary schools in the city, all of which were consolidated into a single entity, St. Michael's Academy, in the autumn of 2009. The non-denominational Pioneer Valley Christian Academy is located in the suburban Sixteen Acres neighborhood, educating K–12. Non-sectarian elementary schools within the City of Springfield include the Pioneer Valley Montessori School in Springfield's Sixteen Acres neighborhood and Orchard Children's Corner in suburban Indian Orchard, a Pre-Kindergarten, among others.

The diocese runs Pope Francis Preparatory School (previously Cathedral High School), which is the largest Catholic high school in Western Massachusetts. Two nonsectarian private schools are also located in Springfield: Commonwealth Academy located on the former campus of the MacDuffie School (which moved to Granby, Massachusetts, in 2011 after 130 years in Springfield), and teaches grades four through twelve, soon to enroll students in grades K–12; and the Academy Hill School, which teaches kindergarten through grade eight.

Within 15 miles (24 km) of Springfield are many private prep schools, which can serve as day schools for Springfield students; they include the Williston Northampton School in Easthampton, Massachusetts; Wilbraham & Monson Academy in Wilbraham, Massachusetts; and Suffield Academy in Suffield, Connecticut.

=== Higher education ===
==== Universities and colleges ====
The Knowledge Corridor boasts the second-largest concentration of higher learning institutions in the United States, with 32 universities and liberal arts colleges and over 160,000 university students in Greater Hartford–Springfield. This includes two college consortia, the Five Colleges, and the Cooperating Colleges of Greater Springfield, whose member institutions often collaborate in greater outreach programs. Within 16 miles (26 km) of Springfield's Metro Center, there are 18 universities and liberal arts colleges, which enroll approximately 100,000 students.

As of 2015, Springfield attracts over 20,000 university students per year. Its universities and colleges include Western New England University; Springfield College, famous as the birthplace of the sport of basketball (1891) and the nation's first physical education class, (1912); American International College, founded to educate America's immigrant population, is notable as the inventor of the Model Congress program. UMass Amherst relocated its urban design center graduate program to Court Square in Metro Center.

Several of Greater Springfield's institutions rank among the most prestigious in the world. For example, Amherst College, 15 miles (24 km) north of Springfield, and Smith College, 13 miles (21 km) north of Springfield, consistently rank among America's top 10 liberal arts colleges. Mount Holyoke College—the United States' first women's college—consistently ranks among America's Top 15 colleges, and it is located only 9 miles (14 km) north of Springfield. Hampshire College is located 14 miles (23 km) north of Springfield. The 30,000-student University of Massachusetts Amherst is located 16 miles (26 km) north of Springfield. Approximately 10 miles (16 km) west of Springfield, across the Memorial Bridge in Westfield, is Westfield State University, founded by noted education reformer Horace Mann. Westfield was the first university in America to admit students without regard to sex, race, or economic status.

Just outside Springfield's northern city limits is Elms College, a Catholic college. Likewise, just 2 miles (3.2 km) below Springfield's southern city limit in Longmeadow is Bay Path University; both schools were once all-women but are now co-ed.

==== Community colleges ====
In 1968, following the Pentagon's controversial closing of the Springfield Armory, Springfielders founded Springfield Technical Community College on 35 acres (14.2 ha) behind the Springfield Armory National Park. Springfield Technical Community College is the only polytechnic community college in Massachusetts, and was founded to continue Springfield's tradition of technical innovation.

Holyoke Community College, 8 miles (13 km) north of Springfield, offers more traditional community college programming in Greater Springfield, as well as instruction in the culinary arts.

== Media ==
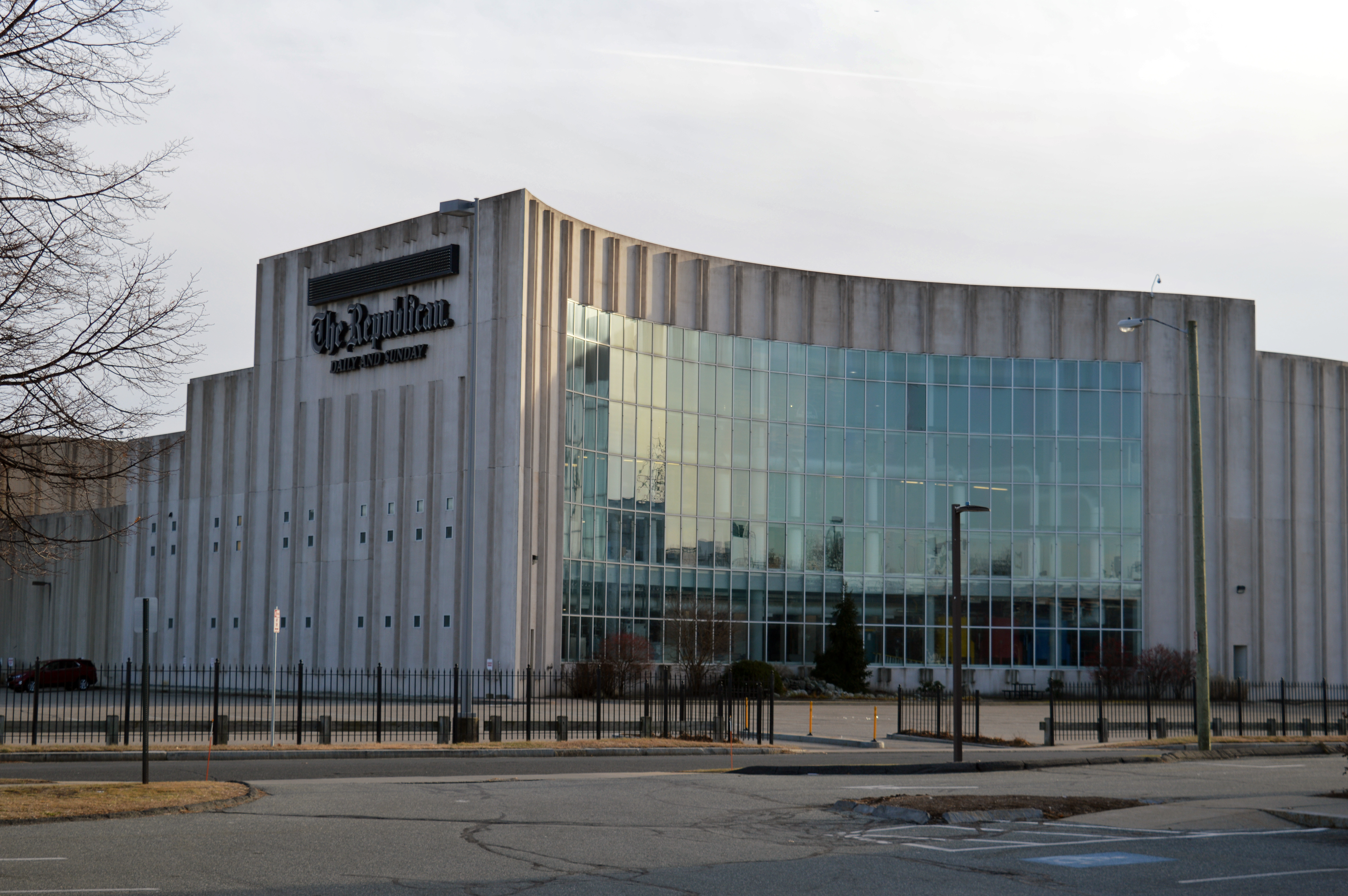
Headquarters and printing facilities of The Republican

=== Newspapers ===
Springfield's largest local newspaper is The Republican, which has also previously been known as the Springfield Union-News & Sunday Republican, from when it merged with the Springfield Union. Smaller papers such as The Reminder and the Valley Advocate also serve Greater Springfield.

Other newspapers serve specific communities of interest, such as El Pueblo Latino and El Sol Latino, which serve the Hispanic community, as well as Unity First and the AfAm Point of View, both of which serve the African-American community, and The Rainbow Times, which serves Springfield's LGBT community.

=== Television ===
Springfield has a long history of broadcast television, including two of the oldest UHF television stations on the air today.

Channel (digital/virtual)	Call sign	Network	Owner
11/22	WWLP	NBC/CW (through The CW Plus) (DT2); Ion Television (DT3)	Nexstar Media Group
21/3.5	WSHM-LD	CBS	Gray Television
13/57	WGBY	PBS	WGBH Educational Foundation; Operated by New England Public Media
21/22	WFXQ-CD	NBC++	Nexstar Media Group
40	WGGB	ABC, FOX/MyNetworkTV (DT2)	Gray Television
43	WHTX-LP	Univision	Entravision Communications

==== Cable operators ====
Springfield proper is serviced exclusively by Comcast cable. Springfield was formerly wired with a "dual plant" cable system from 1980 until 2001, requiring an A/B switch for each home to watch programming and complicating VCR recordings.

=== Radio ===
Springfield was home to the first commercially licensed radio station in the United States, and the oldest radio station of any kind in New England: WBZ, which broadcast live from Springfield's luxurious Hotel Kimball at 140 Chestnut Street (now the Kimball Towers Condominiums) before moving to Boston in 1931.

Callsign	Frequency	City/town	Network affiliation / owner	Format
WFCR	88.5 FM	Springfield	University of Massachusetts Amherst	Public Radio
WSKB	89.5 FM	Westfield	Westfield State University	College Radio
WSCB	89.9 FM	Springfield	Springfield College	College Radio
WTCC	90.7 FM	Springfield	Springfield Technical Community College	Public Radio
WAIC	91.9 FM	Springfield	American International College	College Radio
WHYN-FM	93.1 FM	Springfield	iHeartMedia	Hot Adult Contemporary (Hip-Hop on HD2)
WMAS-FM	94.7 FM	Enfield, Connecticut	Audacy	Adult contemporary (Country on HD2)
W247DL	97.3 FM	Springfield	iHeartMedia	Hip-Hop (simulcast of WHYN-FM-HD2)
W251CT	98.1 FM	Springfield	Audacy	Spanish Hits (simulcast of WHLL & WMAS-HD2)
W255DL	98.9 FM	Springfield	iHeartMedia	News/Talk (simulcast of WHYN)
WLZX-FM	99.3 FM	Northampton	Saga Communications of New England	"Everything That Rocks"
WLCQ-LP	99.7 FM	Feeding Hills	Lighthouse Christian Center	Christian Rock/Pop Music, "The Q"
W261DD	100.1 FM	Springfield	Red Wolf Broadcasting Corporation	Rhythmic Contemporary (simulcast of WACM)
WRNX	100.9 FM	Amherst	iHeartMedia	Country
WAQY	102.1 FM	Springfield	Saga Communications of New England	Classic rock
WCCH	103.5 FM	Holyoke	Holyoke Community College	College Radio
WNEK-FM	105.1 FM	Springfield	Western New England University	College Radio
WWEI	105.5 FM	Easthampton/Springfield	Audacy	Sports Talk (simulcast of WEEI-FM in Boston)
WEIB	106.3 FM	Northampton/Springfield	Cutting Edge Broadcasting	Smooth Jazz
WHYN	560 AM	Springfield	iHeartMedia	News/Talk
WNNZ	640 AM	Westfield	University of Massachusetts Amherst	Public Radio (programmed by WFCR)
WACE	730 AM	Chicopee	Carter Broadcasting Corporation	Religious
WARE	1250 AM	Ware	Success Signal Broadcasting	Oldies
WACM	1270 AM	Springfield	Red Wolf Broadcasting Corporation	Rhythmic contemporary
WHLL	1450 AM	Springfield	Audacy	Spanish Hits
WSPR	1490 AM	Springfield	Davidson Media Group	Spanish

== Infrastructure ==
=== Transportation ===
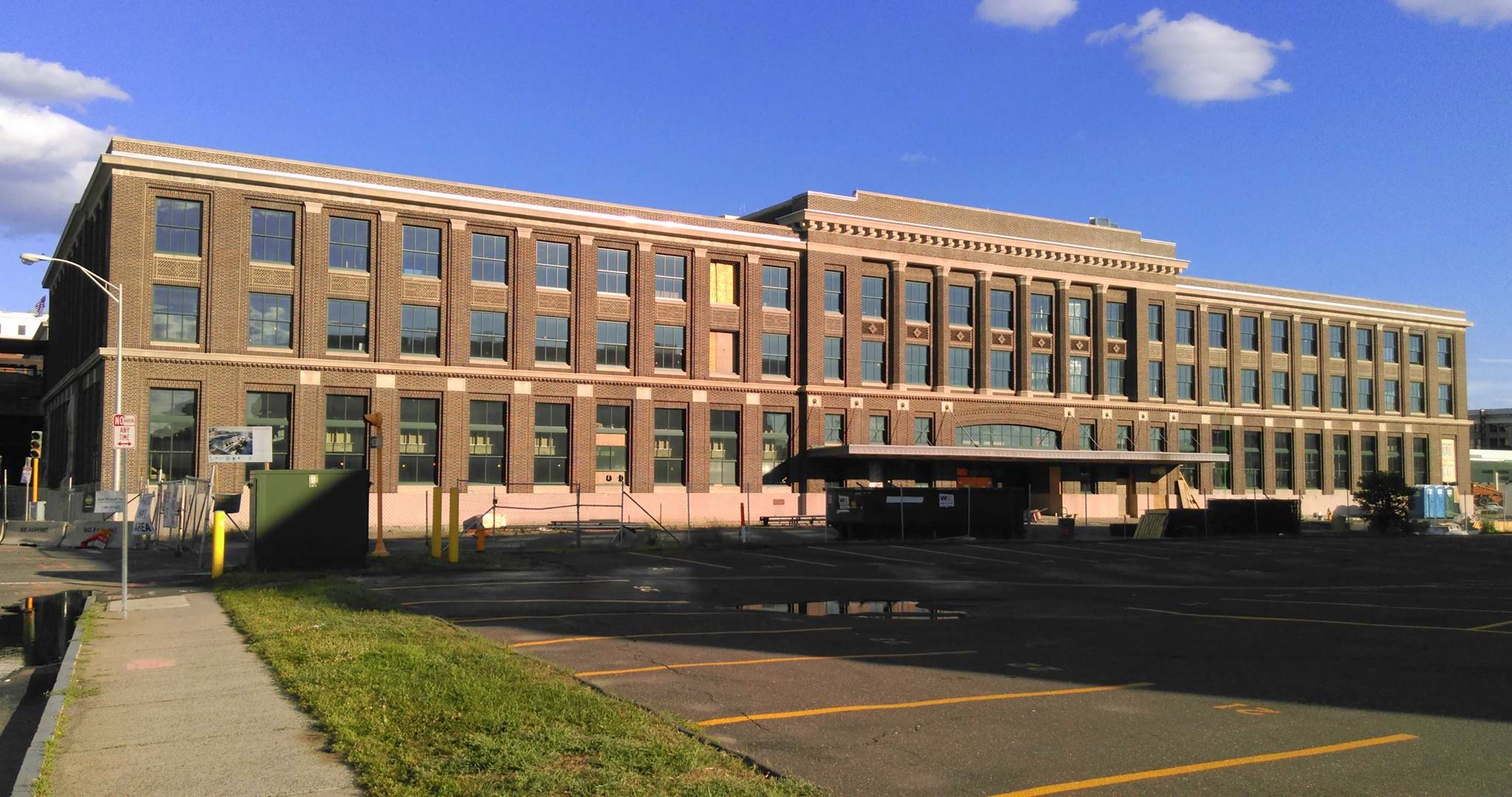
Union Station is used for bus, Amtrak, and commuter rail service

Springfield is called the Crossroads of New England because it is the major shipping nexus from New York City, Boston, Montreal and the Great Lakes (via Albany, New York). Much of the cargo heading from one of these places to another crosses through the City of Springfield. As a geographical trade center, Springfield has more advantages than just being equidistant to these other large trade centers—it sits beside the Connecticut River, is located near some of the most fertile farmland in the Northeast, and is served by numerous rail lines and Interstate Highways, including I-90 (Mass Pike) and I-91, which connect New Haven, Hartford, Holyoke, Northampton, and Vermont to Springfield. One of the few spurs of I-91 in Massachusetts, I-291, runs through Springfield, and provides a secondary connection between I-90 and I-91.

==== Rail ====
Springfield Union Station, originally opened in 1926 and re-opened in 2017, is served by five Amtrak intercity routes: the Vermonter, which runs from Washington, D.C. to St. Albans, Vermont; the Lake Shore Limited, which runs from Chicago to Boston; the Amtrak Hartford Line, which runs from Springfield to New Haven; the Valley Flyer, which runs from New Haven to Greenfield; and the Northeast Regional, which runs from Springfield to D.C./Virginia. Amtrak relocated its operations into Union Station proper from their previous track side station building in June 2019.

CT Rail's Hartford Line started operating from Union Station in June 2018, with Springfield as the northern terminus. Trains operate to New Haven, CT with multiple stops in Connecticut along the way. The line shares the same route and station listing as the Amtrak route of the same name, and the two are operated in conjunction as a commuter rail service for the region.

The New Haven–Springfield Line was upgraded in conjunction with the launch of the Hartford Line service. The project received funding from the Commonwealth of Massachusetts, the Federal Government, and the State of Connecticut. Amtrak trains on the route between New Haven and Springfield reach speeds of 110 mph (177 km/h).

In 2011, Springfield Union Station started a $70 million renovation to become an intermodal transportation facility, allowing Peter Pan Bus, Greyhound Bus, and the PVTA to occupy a modern space next to the renovated Union Station. It was completed in June 2017.

From the late 1800s until June 1940, the Springfield Street Railway served much of the greater Springfield metropolitan area with its 208+ mile streetcar system, which connected Springfield with its various neighborhoods.

==== Bus ====
The Pioneer Valley Transit Authority (PVTA) is based in Springfield and uses Union Station as its Springfield hub, next to the Gothic arch that denotes the entrance to downtown Springfield. The PVTA operates nineteen bus routes from Union Station. The PVTA's Springfield service area includes Springfield, Holyoke, Chicopee, Westfield, West Springfield, Ludlow, Agawam, and East Longmeadow. With transfers, it is possible to travel into PVTA's northern service area, which includes Northampton, Amherst, and Easthampton.

Intercity bus service is provided by Peter Pan Bus Lines and Greyhound Lines, both of which operate from Union Station. They provide service to destinations across the northeast United States.

==== Air ====
Springfield is primarily served by Bradley International Airport, in Windsor Locks, Connecticut, 12 miles (19 km) south of downtown. It features over 100 daily departures to 30 destinations on nine airlines. It is also the primary airport for Hartford.

Other regional airports serving Springfield include:

- Westfield-Barnes Regional Airport is 12 miles (19 km) from downtown Springfield in Westfield, Massachusetts. It is 1.5 miles (2.4 km) from the Massachusetts Turnpike.
- Westover Metropolitan Airport is 5 miles (8 km) from downtown Springfield. It is 3 miles (5 km) from the Massachusetts Turnpike.
- Logan International Airport in Boston is approximately 80 miles (130 km) northeast of Springfield.

==== Cycling ====
The city's Connecticut River Walk Park offers a largely uninterrupted bike route from the North to South End, and is part of a broader plan by the Pioneer Valley Planning Commission to create a continuous route alongside the Connecticut River from Agawam to Holyoke, with construction and planning ongoing.

The city recently partnered with Bewegen (an e-bike share system provider) to install e-bike share stations in both Springfield and West Springfield.

=== Water and sewer system ===
The Springfield Water and Sewer Commission (created in its current form in 1996) owns several reservoirs and aqueducts, as well as hydropower and sewage treatment stations. The city purchased the Springfield Aqueduct Company in 1872.

Borden Brook Reservoir, located in the rural western Hampden County town of Blandford was completed in 1910. It feeds into the Cobble Mountain Reservoir (completed in 1931) located at the junction of the towns of Blandford, Granville and Russell. The Wild Cat Aqueduct carries water from the Cobble Mountain Reservoir to a hydroelectric generating station on the Granville–Russell border, at the Little River. Drinking water flows to the West Parish Water Filtration Plant in Westfield, and is then pumped to holding tanks at the top of Provin Mountain in Agawam.

The 1875 Ludlow Reservoir, also known as Springfield Reservoir, is maintained as an emergency water supply; it is located in Ludlow and fed via the Broad Brook Canal.

SWSC provides retail water in Springfield and Ludlow; wholesale water to Agawam, East Longmeadow, and Longmeadow; partial or peak service to Southwick, Westfield, and West Springfield; and emergency service to Chicopee and Wilbraham.

=== Emergency services ===
The Springfield Fire Department provides fire protection and emergency medical services to the city, and is one of the oldest fire departments in the United States.

== Notable people ==
- Creighton Abrams, U.S. Army general, Chief of Staff of the United States Army, and Commander of Operations during the Vietnam War
- Weston Adams, longtime president of the NHL's Boston Bruins
- Johnny Appleseed, American folk hero, spent his childhood and young adulthood in Springfield
- Joe Arpaio, "America's Toughest Sheriff", known for "tent city" prison in Maricopa County, Arizona
- Adele Addison, soprano, acclaimed in classical music during the 1950s–1960s
- Joel Asaph Allen, zoologist
- George Ashmun, founder of the U.S. Republican Party and Springfield lawyer
- Travis Best, National Basketball Association player
- Alfred Ely Beach, inventor of New York City's subway system
- Mary Agnes Dalrymple Bishop (1857–1934), American journalist, newspaper editor
- R. P. Blackmur, poet and literary critic
- Nina Blackwood, original MTV VJ and Sirius Satellite Radio DJ
- Ran Blake, jazz pianist
- Thomas Blanchard, inventor of lathe (1819), which led to technological advances known as interchangeable parts and assembly line manufacturing; also, inventor of first modern car—powered by steam (1825)
- Herbert Blomstedt, orchestra conductor of Danish National Symphony Orchestra, and symphony orchestras in San Francisco and Stockholm, Sweden
- Edward Boland, U.S. Congressman 1952–1989
- Cheryl Boone Isaacs, first African-American and third woman to become President of the Academy of Motion Picture Arts and Sciences
- Mary Ann Booth, American photomicroscopy pioneer, parasitologist, whose work on the bubonic plague and many other diseases was internationally regarded
- Chester Bowles, former Governor of Connecticut
- Samuel Bowles, journalist, founder of Springfield Republican, one of founders of United States Republican Party
- Lloyd Wheaton Bowers, lawyer and former U.S. Solicitor General
- Ron Brace, National Football League player
- Milton Bradley, inventor of parlor games and game-manufacturer
- Chuck Bresnahan, NFL coach
- John Brown, abolitionist
- Harold R. Bull, completed the weather report that enabled the D-Day launch during World War II
- Nick Buoniconti, NFL Hall of Famer
- Thornton Burgess, children's author, known for "Peter Cottontail"
- Chris Capuano, Major League Baseball pitcher
- Ruth E. Carter, Oscar-winning costume designer for her work on Marvel's Black Panther
- Athan Catjakis (1931–2022), Massachusetts state legislator
- John Cena, WWE wrestler
- Amzi Chapin, cabinet maker, singing-school teacher and shapenote composer
- Chester W. Chapin, railroad magnate
- Deacon Samuel Chapin, early settler of Springfield, 1642
- John A. Chapman (1965–2002), USAF Combat Controller, posthumously awarded the Medal of Honor
- Thornton Chase, first American convert to the Baháʼí Faith
- Yodelin' Slim Clark, singer
- Bobby Coleman, singer-songwriter
- George R. Collins, art historian
- Jeff Cook, soccer coach
- Otis H. Cooley, daguerreotype photographer
- Shamus Culhane, lead animator at Walt Disney Studios, who produced such classics as Snow White and the Seven Dwarfs
- Billy Curtis, actor, best known as a Munchkin in "The Wizard of Oz", and "Terror of Tinytown"
- Bill Danoff, member of Starland Vocal Band and wrote No. 1 hit "Afternoon Delight"
- Donald Davidson, philosopher, known for studies regarding communication
- Benjamin Henry Day, newspaper publisher
- Jim Douglas, Governor of Vermont from 2003 to 2010
- Vinny Del Negro, NBA player and head coach
- Max Ehrlich, writer, best known for his novel The Reincarnation of Peter Proud, and its film adaptation set in Springfield
- David W. Evans, professor of psychology and neuroscience, Bucknell University
- George Bowman Ferry, architect
- Theodore Foley, Roman Catholic priest, nominated for sainthood in 2008
- June Foray, voice actress for animated films
- Bertram Forer, psychologist, known for the Forer effect
- Carole Fredericks, French musician whose brother was Springfield blues great Taj Mahal
- John Garand, weapons inventor
- Alfred Gaynor, rapist and serial killer
- Theodor Seuss Geisel (a.k.a. Dr. Seuss), writer and illustrator best known for his children's books
- Frederick H. Gillett, Speaker of the United States House of Representatives from 1919 to 1925, United States Senator from 1925 to 1931
- Charles Goodyear, inventor of vulcanized rubber
- Mike Gravel, senator from Alaska
- Chester Harding, portrait painter during the 19th century
- Richard F. Heck, awarded the Nobel Prize in Chemistry in 2010
- Victor Heflin, football player
- Iris Holland, Massachusetts state legislator
- Elizur Holyoke, early explorer of Western Massachusetts, for whom Holyoke, Massachusetts, and the Holyoke Range are named
- Joseph French Johnson, economist, wrote the inspirational "The Price of Success"
- Sophia Orne Johnson (1826–1899), author
- Raymond A. Jordan (1943–2022), state legislator
- Alan Kay, computer scientist
- Edward Kamuda, founder and president of Titanic Historical Society
- Derek Kellogg, LIU Brooklyn men's basketball head coach
- Peter King, sportswriter and TV commentator
- Stanley King, 11th president of Amherst College
- Bob Kudelski, professional hockey player
- Paul LaPalme, Major League Baseball pitcher
- S. R. Lavin, poet and novelist
- Timothy Leary, writer, psychologist and advocate of psychedelic drug research and use
- Norman Leyden, conductor and clarinetist
- Edward Tsang Lu, astronaut
- Arthur MacArthur, Jr., Army general, father of Douglas MacArthur
- William Manchester, historian, author of The Death of a President and other renowned literary works
- Rabbit Maranville, professional baseball player, inducted into Baseball Hall of Fame in 1954
- Frank J. Matrango, state legislator
- Tim Mayotte, professional tennis player
- Patrick Mazeika (born 1993), baseball player
- Linda J. Melconian, public servant, educator, lawyer
- Miles Morgan, hero of King Philip's War of 1675, a statue of Morgan stands in Springfield's Court Square
- Horace A. Moses, philanthropist and paper pioneer
- James Naismith, inventor of basketball
- Richard Neal, U.S. Congressman 1989-Pres
- Tom Newberry, football player
- Lowell North, Olympic gold medalist in sailing
- Larry O'Brien, Postmaster General, Democratic National Committee chairman and Commissioner of the National Basketball Association
- Jerry Orbach, Actor
- Phil Page, Major League Baseball pitcher
- Robert B. Parker, author of Spenser and Jesse Stone novels
- Joe Philbin, head coach of NFL Miami Dolphins
- Maude Gillette Phillips (1860–?), author, educator
- Nella Brown Pond (1858–1893), dramatic reader
- Eleanor Powell, actress and tap dancer
- William Pynchon, founder of City of Springfield; earlier founded Roxbury, Massachusetts; in 1649, wrote America's first banned book
- Joe Ragland (born 1989), American-Liberian basketball player for Hapoel Eilat of the Israeli Basketball Premier League
- Caleb Rice, first Mayor of Springfield, President of MassMutual
- George Washington Rice, founder of MassMutual Life Insurance
- William Rice, Methodist minister, President and Executive Director of the Springfield City Library Association
- William Marsh Rice, founder of Rice University, Houston, Texas
- Stephen Rivers (1955–2010), political activist and publicist.
- Peter Robinson, actor and freak show performer
- Kurt Russell, actor
- Julia Sanderson, actress, vaudevillian, and namesake of Springfield's Julia Sanderson Theater (now The Paramount Theater)
- Joe Scibelli, Los Angeles Rams professional football player
- Mike Scully, writer and producer for The Simpsons
- Chloë Sevigny, actress
- Michael Shapiro, actor and voice actor
- Daniel Shays, leader of Shays' Rebellion
- John Shea, actor and director
- Eddie Shore, professional hockey player and owner
- David Socha international soccer referee
- Talbert W. Swan II: Prelate, Church Of God In Christ, Activist, Author
- Tommy Tallarico, video game music composer
- Antonio Thomas, professional wrestler
- Louise Hall Tharp, biographer
- George Tomasini, film editor known for work with Alfred Hitchcock
- Mike Trombley, former Major League Baseball pitcher
- Paige Turco, actress
- Frank Vatrano, ice hockey player
- Lynn Vincent, author
- Benjamin Wade, U.S. senator from Ohio
- Peter Welch, U.S. senator from Vermont
- David Ames Wells, engineer and economist
- Daniel Baird Wesson, weapons inventor and founder of Smith & Wesson
- Maura West, Daytime Emmy award-winning soap opera actress
- James McNeill Whistler, painter
- Mary Margaret O'Reilly, civil servant
- Terence H. Winkless, film and television director

=== Notable musical artists ===
- The Acacia Strain, deathcore band
- Agoraphobic Nosebleed, grindcore band
- All That Remains, metalcore band
- Destrophy, Otep, Erik Tisinger, guitarist and bassist, from Springfield
- Killswitch Engage, metalcore band
- Lucy Escott, soprano
- Eddie Fontaine, singer
- Carole Fredericks, singer
- Ashley Gearing, country music artist
- Taj Mahal, blues musician
- Tony MacAlpine, fusion musician
- Joe Morello, jazz drummer with the Dave Brubeck Quartet
- Mark Mulcahy musician
- Linda Perry, songwriter, formerly of 4 Non Blondes
- Shadows Fall, metalcore band
- Signs, reggaeton band
- Staind, alternative rock band
- Paul Weston, composer for Bing Crosby, Frank Sinatra, and others
- Wanita "D. Woods" Woodgette, hip hop artist
- D. Woods, member of group Danity Kane
- Phil Woods, jazz saxophonist with Quincy Jones, Steely Dan, Paul Simon, others

== Sister cities ==
- Bracigliano, Salerno, Italy
- Takikawa, Hokkaido, Japan
- Tralee, County Kerry, Ireland

== See also ==
- The Children's Study Home
- National Register of Historic Places listings in Springfield, Massachusetts
- Equivalent Lands
- USS Springfield, 4 ships
