= Neighborhoods in Springfield, Massachusetts =

Neighborhoods of Springfield, Massachusetts

The City of Springfield, Massachusetts, has 19 distinct neighborhoods. Many feature subdivisions known by other names, such as The X, Hungry Hill, and Mason Square. Springfield's neighborhoods fan out north, south, and east, from its original, colonial settlement in what is now Metro Center.

== Topographical history ==
Initially and throughout colonial times, Springfield was oriented north–south along the Connecticut River, with Court Square at its center. Springfield's second neighborhood developed after George Washington and Henry Knox founded the Springfield Armory on a bluff in 1777. A neighborhood filled in around the Armory, composed of attractive mansions and handsome apartments blocks. Springfield's third neighborhood formed when the Springfield Armory expanded its production facilities to what is now known as Watershops Pond; the neighborhood around the Lower Watershops became known as Upper Hill. With the arrival of the train in the 1830s, a fifth neighborhood took shape - although much of that neighborhood was destroyed to make I-291, one would now know it as southern Liberty Heights. The miles between each of these neighborhoods gave rise to Springfield's first nickname, "The City of Magnificent Distances." However, as Springfield quickly became among the most wealthy cities in country, new neighborhoods filled in the gaps between the old ones, (as in the case of the South End), and other neighborhoods were created from elegant designs, such as the beautiful Victorian McKnight Historic District and the gorgeous Frederick Law Olmsted-designed Forest Park neighborhood.

Springfield's first "Gold Coast" was the Lower Maple, Maple-Hill, and Ridgewood Historic Districts. This area includes Mulberry Street, which was made famous by Dr. Seuss' first children's book And to Think That I Saw It on Mulberry Street. In 1881, Springfield's McKnight National Historic District became the United States' first planned residential neighborhood. The area features over 900 Victorian "painted lady" houses, similar to those found in San Francisco.

== Topography ==
=== Metro Center ===
Since 1636, Metro Center has served as the cultural, civic, and business center of Springfield and Western Massachusetts. The neighborhood sits on relatively flat land along the Connecticut Riverbank and stretches approximately two hundred meters inland where the first of a series of bluffs rises between the parallel Dwight and Chestnut Streets, (behind the MassMutual Center.) This bluff, essentially, constitutes a change in the character of the neighborhood, from one of high-rises, businesses, and nightlife in the low-lying areas to one of cultural institutions (e.g. The Springfield Museums, the Springfield Public Library, the Massachusetts Data Center, and Federal Courts) and residential neighborhoods like Mattoon Street and the Apremont Triangle atop the bluff.

Even by urban, New England standards, Springfield's Metro Center - stretching from The Arch at the north end of Main Street to swath cut through the city by the 2011 Greater Springfield tornado near Union Street - remains easily walkable, with characteristically New England architecture surrounding Court Square, the Neo-Classical Springfield Municipal Group, the post-modern MassMutual Center, the varied Club Quarter (by Worthington Street,) Union Station, and the predominantly Neo-Classical architecture of aforementioned cultural institutions atop the first bluff.

Erecting the elevated, (later walled) I-91 highway along Springfield's Connecticut Riverfront during the early 1960s disrupted numerous neighborhoods and continues acting as a barrier between, for example, the Basketball Hall of Fame and Metro Center, making it difficult to access the Connecticut River. In 2010, the Urban Land Institute suggested ways to reunite Springfield with the Connecticut River – and the riverfront Basketball Hall of Fame – however, as yet no action been taken. Eastern Metro Center rises steeply along a prominent bluff. Atop this bluff sit the Quadrangle-Mattoon Street Historic District, The Kimball Towers, and The McIntosh – a residential district that is partly protected by the Apremont Triangle National Historic District – and further eastward, the Quadrangle cultural district, the Springfield City Library, and ultimately, the Springfield Armory National Park. In recent years, Metro Center has become an increasingly popular residential neighborhood for those who seek an urban lifestyle without high prices – among them, bohemians, artists, LGBT residents, and empty-nesters. As demographics have changed in Metro Center, Springfield's crime ranking has dropped significantly – in 2010, Springfield ranked 51st in the United States' "City Crime Rankings," after ranking 18th in just 2003, with its overall crime rate having fallen by more than 50 percent.

Directly south of Metro Center, along Main Street, is Springfield's South End – the center of its Italian community. The South End features numerous Feast Day celebrations throughout the year, as well as dozens of Italian restaurants, pastry shops, and cultural landmarks. The Naismith Memorial Basketball Hall of Fame is located on the riverfront in the South End; however, it is cut off from the neighborhood, Main Street, and Metro Center by Interstate 91. Just east of the South End, along one of the Connecticut River's most prominent bluffs, is Springfield's original "Gold Coast," the Lower Maple Historic District. Off of Maple Street, the Ridgewood Historic District includes mansions and condominiums along Ridgewood Terrace and Mulberry Street, the latter of Dr. Seuss fame.

South of Springfield's South End are its Victorian garden districts, Forest Park and Forest Park Heights. Both neighborhoods ring around Frederick Law Olmsted's 735 acres (2.97 km^{2}) beauty, Forest Park. Cited by This Old House magazine in 2011 as having the best Victorian housing stock in the Northeast, many of Forest Park's 600 Victorian Painted Ladies have been recently renovated. Olmsted's Forest Park features the Zoo at Forest Park – a small, well-kept zoo with an extensive, exotic collection – numerous playgrounds, 38 tennis courts, the 31-acre Porter Lake, which features paddle-boating and fishing, numerous sculptures, dozens of walking/hiking trails, Victorian promenades, basketball courts, baseball diamonds, tree groves, an aquatic park, bocce courts, lawn bowling, the United States' first, public swimming pool (1899), and The Barney Mansion.

To the east of Forest Park is the aptly named East Forest Park, an upper-middle-class neighborhood that features well-maintained bungalows and Craftsman-style houses, centered on Lake Massasoit – Springfield's second largest body of water after the Connecticut River. To the east of East Forest Park is Sixteen Acres Springfield's largest and most recently developed neighborhood, which is upper-middle class and suburban in character. Sixteen Acres is a suburb within a city and home to Western New England University, the university's renowned law and pharmacy schools, Veteran's Memorial Golf Course, and the SABIS International School, which ranks among the Top 95 percent of high schools in America.

The geographic center of Springfield features four distinct neighborhoods, all of which feature Victorian architecture – The McKnight National Historic District, Old Hill, Upper Hill, and Bay. Historically, McKnight had been the center of Springfield's African American and Jamaican community; however, within the past 20 years, many LGBT residents have moved into the neighborhood, changing its demographics. Currently, Bay is Springfield's primarily African American and Jamaican neighborhood. The Old Hill neighborhood features a growing Latino population, and like Upper Hill, borders scenic Lake Massasoit. Upper Hill features Springfield College. Across the neighborhood, these four neighborhoods' main commercial district is called Mason Square. Mason Square is home to the aesthetically pleasing red-brick campus of American International College.

To the north of Metro Center are the three neighborhoods that constitute Springfield's "North End" – three largely Latino neighborhoods, (which were, several decades ago, predominantly Greek and Irish) - featuring Springfield's three nationally ranked hospitals: Baystate Health, Mercy Hospital, and Shriner's Children's Hospital. Since the 1970s, Springfield's North End has been split in two by Interstate 91, which has caused unanticipated, social problems. Springfield's Brightwood neighborhood – a formerly blighted neighborhood of old mill buildings, has been adaptively re-used as a state-of-the-art medical campus for Baystate Health. Memorial Square is the North End's commercial district. To the east of Memorial Square is Liberty Heights, which features Springfield's historically Irish neighborhood Hungry Hill. Liberty Heights features easy access to major travel routes and to Elms College, a Catholic university just across Springfield's border with Chicopee. To the north of Liberty Heights is the attractive, leafy residential neighborhood known as Atwater Park. To the east of Liberty Heights is East Springfield, a primarily blue-collar neighborhood bordering the City of Chicopee. Springfield's most northeasterly neighborhood is Indian Orchard, a former streetcar suburb that is currently known as an artist's haven. To the south of Indian Orchard is Pine Point, a quiet, middle-class neighborhood that home to the Fortune 100 MassMutual Company, and is the proposed site of a large, new park.

== Neighborhoods, alphabetized ==
- Atwater Park – features the main Baystate Health campus and a residential neighborhood.
- Bay – features Blunt Park. Demographically, Bay is primarily African American.
- Boston Road – features the Eastfield Mall. Primarily commercial in character, it features shopping plazas designed for automobile travel.
- Brightwood – features numerous Baystate Health specialty buildings. Amputated from the rest of Springfield by the Interstate 91 elevated highway. Academic suggestions are currently being made to better reunite the neighborhood with the city.
- East Forest Park – features Cathedral High School. Primarily middle class residential in character. Borders East Longmeadow, Massachusetts.
- East Springfield – features Smith & Wesson and the Performance Food Group. Residential and working-class in character.
- Forest Park – features Frederick Law Olmsted's renowned 735 acres (2.97 km^{2}) Forest Park and the Forest Park Heights Historic District (established 1975). Residential in character, featuring a commercial district at "The X" and an upper-class garden district surrounding Olmsted's park.
- Indian Orchard – features a well-defined Main Street and historic mill buildings that have become artists' spaces. Formerly a suburb of Springfield, Indian Orchard developed separately as a milltown on the Chicopee River before joining Springfield. Primarily residential in character, Indian Orchard features Lake Lorraine State Park, Hubbard Park, and weekly farmers markets.
- Liberty Heights – features Springfield's three nationally ranked hospitals: Baystate Health, Mercy Medical, and Shriner's Children's Hospital. Primarily residential and medical in character, it features a demographically diverse population. Liberty Heights includes eclectic districts like Hungry Hill and Springfield's 2nd largest park, Van Horn Park.
- The McKnight Historic District – features the Knowledge Corridor's largest array of historic, Victorian architecture, including over 900 Painted Ladies. Primarily residential in character, McKnight was the United States' first planned residential neighborhood. McKnight's commercial district is called Mason Square. Features American International College. Demographically, McKnight features significant populations of African American and LGBT residents.
- Memorial Square – features the North End's commercial district.
- Metro Center – features nearly all major cultural venues in the region. Commercial, cultural, civic, and increasingly residential in character. Features the Downtown Business District, The Club Quarter – with over 60 clubs, restaurants, and bars – numerous festivals, cultural institutions, educational institutions, and significant historic sites.
- North End – not technically a Springfield neighborhood, but rather three northern Springfield neighborhoods. Includes Brightwood, which is residential and medical in character, but cut off from the rest of the city by Interstate 91; Memorial Square, which is commercial in character; and Liberty Heights, which is medical and residential in character. Demographically, the North End is predominantly Puerto Rican.
- Old Hill – features Springfield College. Residential in character. Bordering Lake Massasoit. Demographically, Old Hill is primarily Latino.
- Pine Point – features the headquarters of MassMutual, a Fortune 100 company. Primarily middle-class and residential in character.
- Six Corners – features Mulberry Street in the Ridgewood Historic District (established 1977), the Lower Maple Historic District (established 1977), and the Maple Hill Historic District (established 1977). Urban and residential in character.
- Sixteen Acres – features Western New England University and SABIS International School. Suburban in character. Includes much of Springfield's post-World War II suburban architecture.
- South End – features numerous Italian-American restaurants, festivals, and landmarks. Urban and commercial in character, this neighborhood was hard hit by the June 1, 2011 tornado. Includes the Naismith Memorial Basketball Hall of Fame; however, it is separated from it by Interstate 91.
- Upper Hill – features Wesson Park. Bordering Lake Massasoit. Residential in character. Located between Springfield College and American International College.
