= North End =

North End or Northend may refer to:

== Places ==
=== Canada ===
- North End, Hamilton, Ontario
- North End, Halifax, Nova Scotia
- North End St. Catharines, Ontario
- North End, Winnipeg, Manitoba
- North End, Yarmouth, Nova Scotia

=== South Africa ===
- North End, a suburb of East London, Eastern Cape
- North End, Port Elizabeth, a suburb of Port Elizabeth

=== England ===
- North End, Buckinghamshire
- Northend, Buckinghamshire
- North End, Croydon
- North End, Cumbria
- North End, Essex
- North End, Hampshire
- North End, Bexley, London
  - North End (Bexley ward)
- North End, Hampstead, formerly in the Municipal Borough of Hendon, London
- North End, Fulham, London
- Northend, Somerset
- Northend, Warwickshire

=== United States ===
- North End, a neighborhood of Hartford, Connecticut
- North End (Waterbury), Connecticut
- North End, Boston, Massachusetts
- North End, Springfield, Massachusetts
- North End, Detroit, Michigan
- North End, Saint Paul, Minnesota
- North End, Secaucus, New Jersey
- North End, Niagara Falls, New York

== People ==
- Mary Harrod Northend (1850–1926), American writer

== Sport ==
- North End AFC, a football club in New Zealand
- Preston North End F.C., a football club in England

== Other uses ==
- North End (band), an American band 1979–1982
- North End (café), a Bangladesh-based café
- North End railway station, between Stratford-upon-Avon to Fenny Compton, England, in the 1870s
- North End tube station, London, England, never completed

== See also ==
- North End Historic District (disambiguation)
