= East Forest Park, Springfield, Massachusetts =

Neighborhood in Springfield, Massachusetts, United States

Coordinates: 42°5′46.2″N 72°32′15.7″W

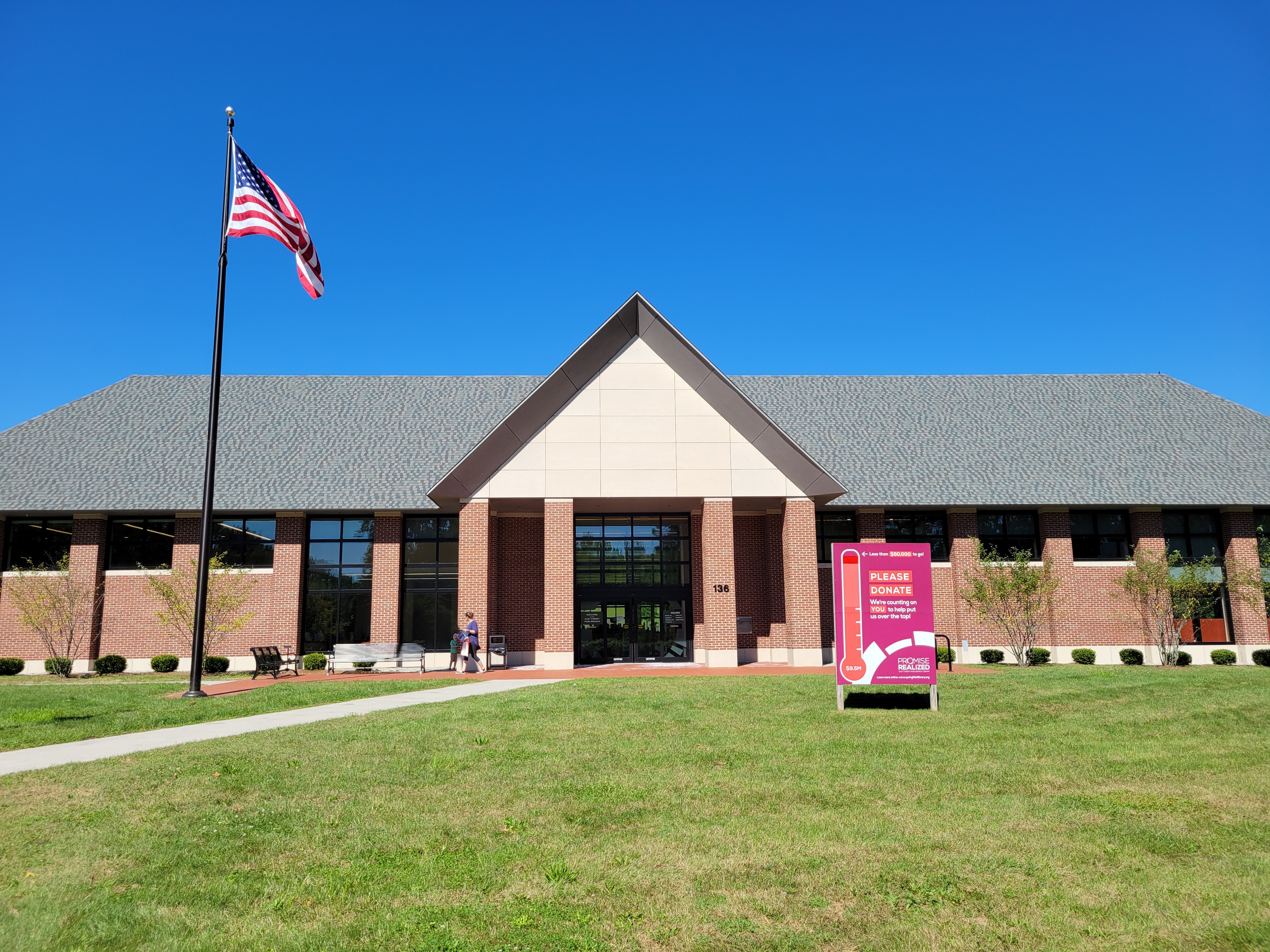
East Forest Park Branch Library

East Forest Park is a neighborhood in the south-central part of Springfield, Massachusetts. The neighborhood borders East Longmeadow, Forest Park, and the Sixteen Acres neighborhood. It is a primarily residential middle-class neighborhood.

== Neighborhood ==
East Forest Park contains a wide variety of pre- and post-World War II homes on the hillside of Watershops Pond, Springfield's largest body of water (other than the Connecticut River), and custom-built colonials and Tudors, as well as capes and ranches.

Several small commercial areas are located on Island Pond Road and Sumner Avenue. The neighborhood was home to Cathedral High School, formerly the city's only Catholic secondary school. It merged with a Catholic school from Holyoke, becoming Pope Francis Preparatory School. In late 2019 the new home of the East Forest Park branch of the Springfield City Library was opened.

== History ==
A section of the Highland Division Railroad, which ran from Enfield, Connecticut, to Springfield, ran through the neighborhood until it was decommissioned in 1993. In the years since, multiple proposals have been made to replace the abandoned sections of track with walking or biking trails, although none have come to fruition as of 2023.

The neighborhood was hit hard by the June 1, 2011 New England tornado outbreak.
