= North End, London =

North End, London may refer to:

- North End, Bexley
- North End, Camden, in the Municipal Borough of Hendon

== See also ==
- North End (disambiguation)
