= Upper Hill =

Upper Hill may refer to:

- Upper Hill, Nairobi
- Upper Hill, Herefordshire, England, a village
- Upper Hill (Pittsburgh)
- Upper Hill, Springfield, Massachusetts
