= North End, Springfield, Massachusetts =

Neighborhood in Massachusetts, US

Coordinates: 42°6′41.4″N 72°35′48.6″W

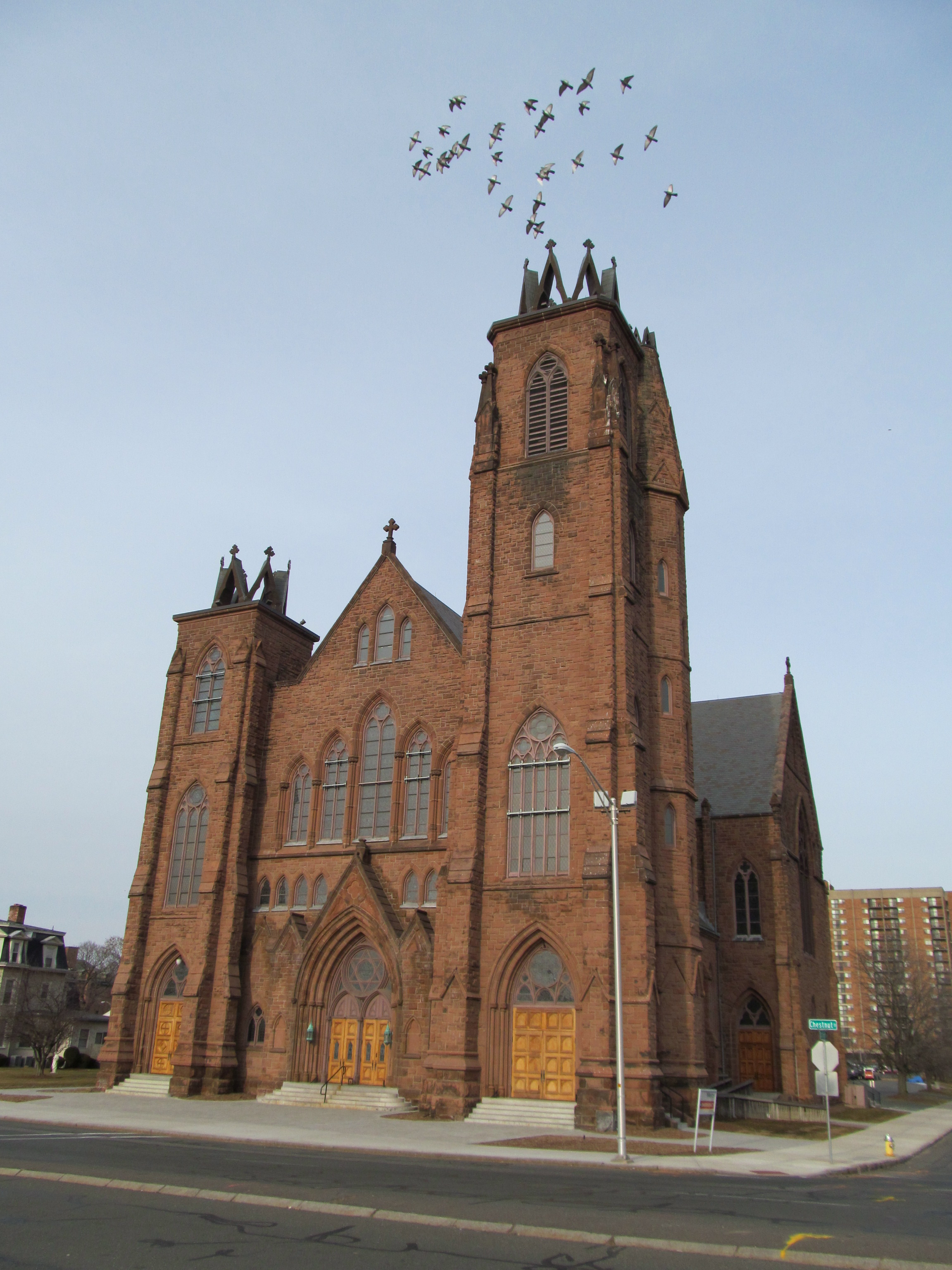
Sacred Heart Church

The North End of Springfield, Massachusetts, is a name that describes three distinct Springfield neighborhoods: Brightwood, Memorial Square, and Liberty Heights. For more than a century, Springfield's North End neighborhood has served as a first home for some of the city's various immigrant communities, from Greeks in Memorial Square to Russians in Liberty Heights. As of 2011, the contemporary Puerto Rican flavor of the North End is evident in numerous banners depicting traditional Carnival masks and the coquí, Puerto Rico's unofficial mascot.

As of 2011, the North End is dominated by Massachusetts' third largest employer, Baystate Health. Approximately ten years ago, the North End was considered one of Springfield's most dangerous neighborhoods; however, that perception has changed as Baystate Health has continued to expand—currently, with a $300 million addition called "The Hospital of the Future", which will add 550 new doctors—and from 1990–2006, Springfield's Latino community's buying power has increased over 295%. Additionally, unlike in other Northeastern cities, Springfield has been fortunate in that rather than leaving the area once adequate buying power is achieved (as has happened in many areas of California, for example), Springfield's Latino residents have chosen to stay—and even to further increase. These trends bode extremely well for the economic and cultural future of Springfield.

Many festivals occur in the North End throughout the year. For example, during Easter, residents of the North End stage a Passion Play, depicting what happened to Jesus Christ during the last 30 hours of his life.

In the summer of 2011, Main Street in Springfield's North End is scheduled to receive $3.6 million in streetlight and walkway improvements. Springfield plans $3.6 million Main Street reconstruction project in North End
