= Theodore Foley =

Roman Catholic priest

Servant of God Theodore of the Mary Immaculate C.P.
- Born: Daniel Foley; 3 March 1913; Springfield, Massachusetts, U.S.
- Died: 9 October 1974 (aged 61); Rome, Italy
- Occupation: Priest

Daniel Bible Foley (March 3, 1913 – October 9, 1974), also known by his religious name Theodore Foley, was an American-Italian Roman Catholic priest and the superior general of the Congregation of the Passion of Jesus Christ from 1964 to 1974. On May 9, 2008, the cause for beatification and canonization of Foley was opened in Rome.

== Life ==
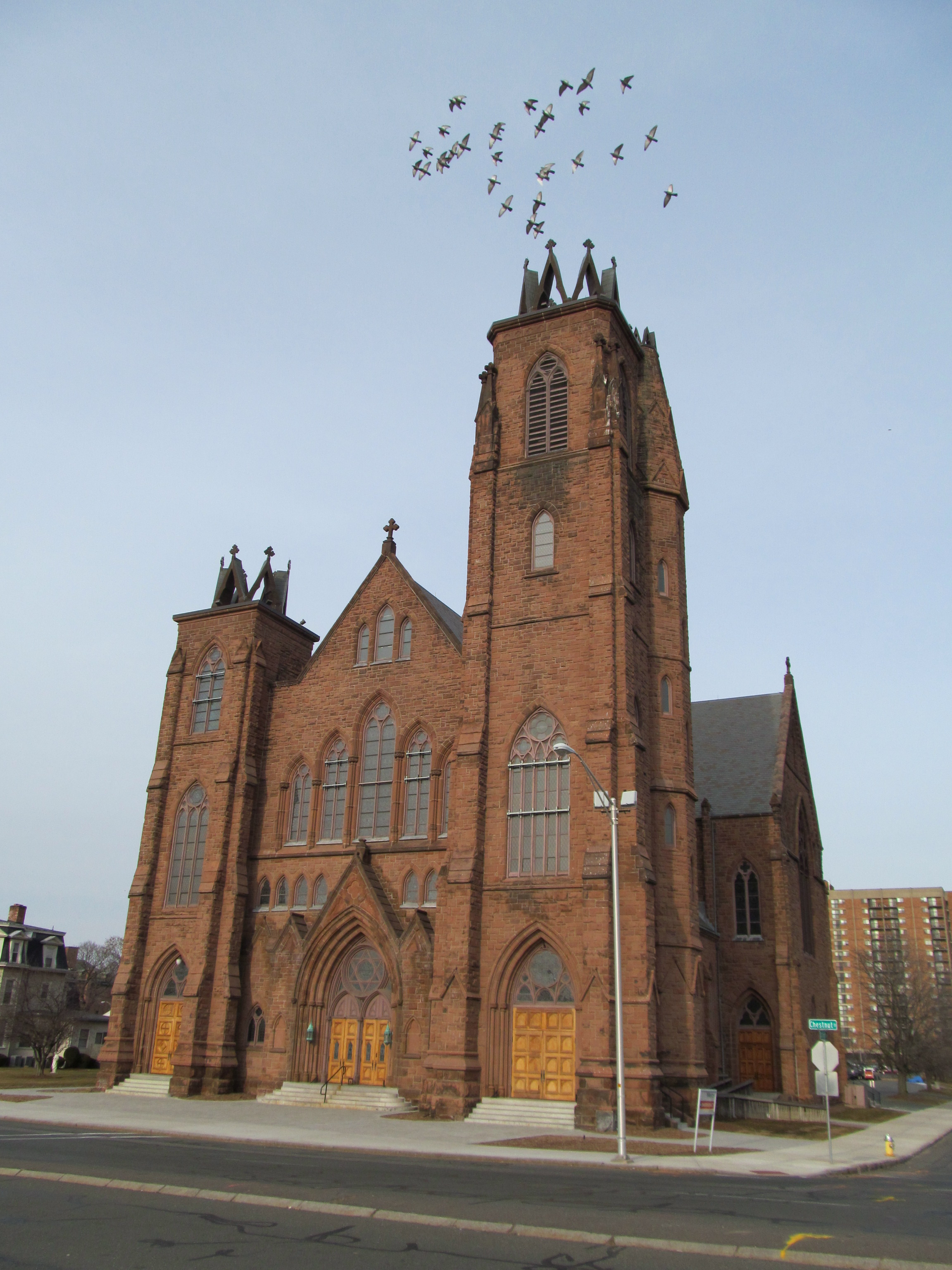
Sacred Heart Church, Springfield MA

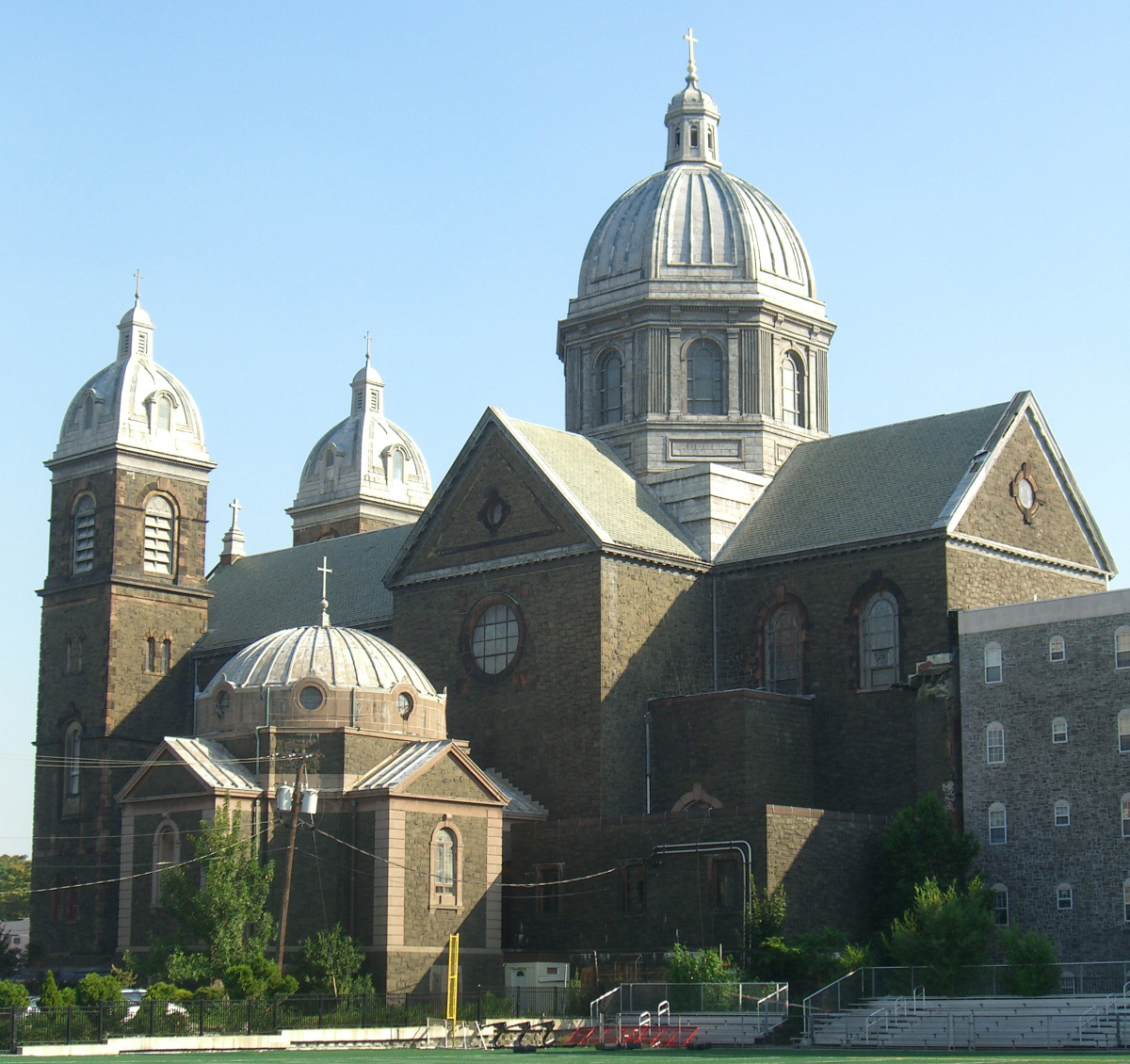
St. Michael's Monastery

Foley was born in the North End, Springfield, Massachusetts on March 3, 1913, the son of Michael and Helen Bible Foley. He attended Mass at Sacred Heart parish in Springfield. He was educated at Sacred Heart Grammar School, Springfield, Cathedral High School, and later Holy Cross Preparatory Seminary, Dunkirk, New York.

He professed his vows on August 15, 1933, at Our Mother of Sorrows Retreat, West Springfield, Massachusetts, and received the religious name Theodore. On April 23, 1940, he was ordained to the Roman Catholic priesthood, in Baltimore, Maryland, by Archbishop Michael Joseph Curley, of the Roman Catholic Archdiocese of Baltimore.

From 1941 to 1942, he was a professor of philosophy for the Passionists. In 1944 he graduated with a Ph.D. in Theology from The Catholic University of America in Washington, D.C. From 1944, he taught theology as a member of the Passionist Seminary faculty at St. Michael's Monastery, Union City, New Jersey. As a teacher, Foley was known for his calm patience.

From 1953 to 1956 he was Director of Passionist Seminarians. In 1956 he was appointed Rector of St. Paul's Monastery, Pittsburgh, Pennsylvania. Foley embraced Pittsburgh. He attended Pirates games and heard Confessions at three Catholic hospitals.

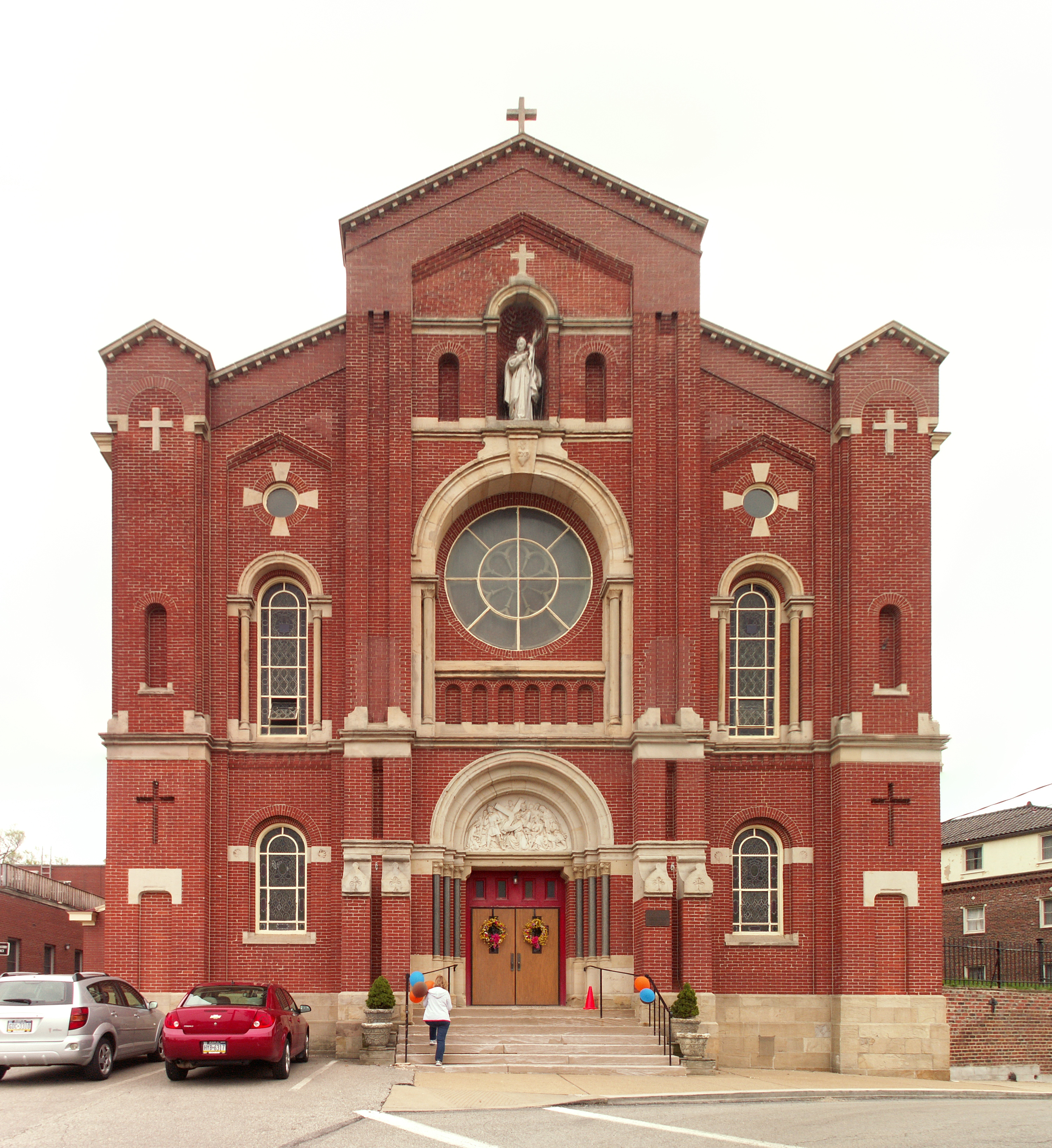
St. Paul of the Cross Monastery Church, South Side Slopes, Pittsburgh

In 1958 he was elected General Consultor for the Passionists in Rome. On May 7, 1964, Fr. Foley was elected Superior General of the Passionists throughout the world, a position he held until his death on October 9, 1974. Foley was the first American from the eastern United States to hold this position and guided the Passionists through Vatican II (1962–1965). In 1970, he was re-elected as Superior General. On October 9, 1974, he died in Rome after contracting an illness on a trip to Asia. Foley is buried at St. Paul of the Cross Monastery Church in Pittsburgh.

== Canonization Process ==
After a review of documentation forwarded to Rome, in 2007 Pope Benedict XVI declared Foley a "Servant of God." On June 23, 2009, Springfield Bishop Timothy A. McDonnell was on hand at the Sacred Heart Church to bless a memorial in honor of Fr. Foley.

Foley is the only person ever to be a candidate for sainthood in western Massachusetts.
