= Van Horn Park =

Massachusetts park

Coordinates: 42.1261°N 72.5949°W

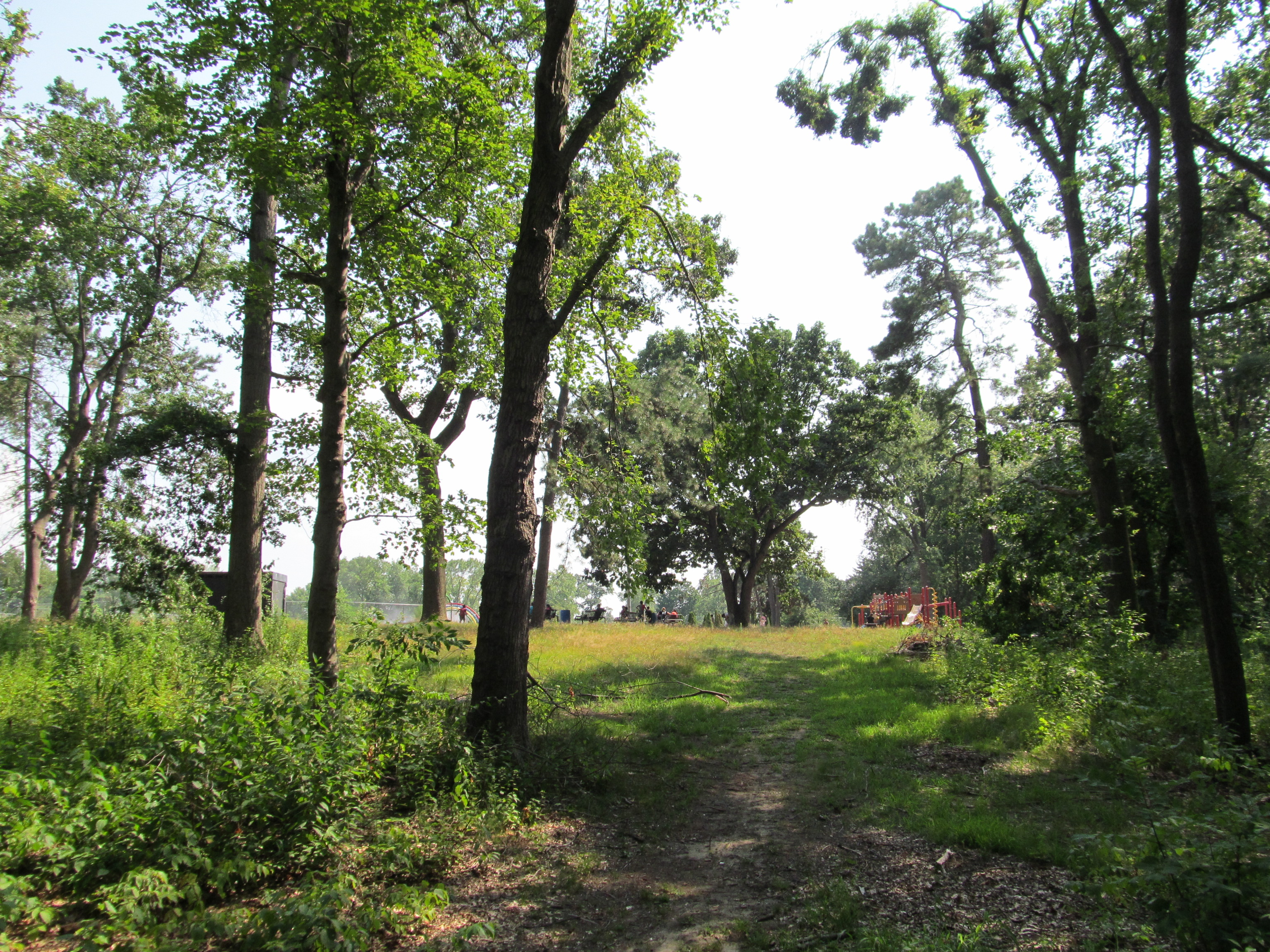
Van Horn Park

Van Horn Park is a park in Springfield, Massachusetts' northern Liberty Heights neighborhood, in a subdivision called Hungry Hill. It is the second largest park in the City of Springfield. (The city's largest park is the 735-acre Forest Park in the southern Forest Park neighborhood.)

== Van Horn Park Dams ==
Van Horn Park features Van Horn Park Pond-River, which has two dams that were created to enhance recreational opportunities in the park. Also, it has baseball diamonds, and basketball courts. Much of the park is wooded and scenic. Celebrations frequently take place in Van Horn Park during the summer months.

Van Horn Park Upper Dam is on the Van Horn Pond River and is also used for recreation purposes. Construction was completed in 1957. It is owned by the City Of Springfield. Van Horn Park Upper Dam is of earthen construction, a gravity dam. Its length is 550 feet. Its capacity is 96 acre-feet (118,000 m^{3}). Normal storage is 79 acre-feet (97,000 m^{3}). It drains an area of 0.46 square miles.

Van Horn Park Lower Dam is on the Van Horn Park Pond River in Hampden County, Massachusetts and is used as a reservoir. Construction was completed in 1957. It is owned by the City Of Springfield. Van Horn Park Lower Dam is of earthen construction, a gravity dam. Its length is 800 feet. Its capacity is 316 acre-feet (390,000 m^{3}). Normal storage is 219 acre-feet (270,000 m^{3}). It drains an area of 0.54 square miles.
