= North End (Bexley ward) =

- Former electoral ward for the Bexley London Borough Council
- North End ward boundaries from 2002 to 2018
- Borough: Bexley
- County: Greater London
- Population: 11,566 (2011)

Former electoral ward
- Created: 1978
- Abolished: 2018
- Councillors: 3
- Replaced by: Barnehurst, Crayford, Slade Green and Northend
- GSS code: E05000079

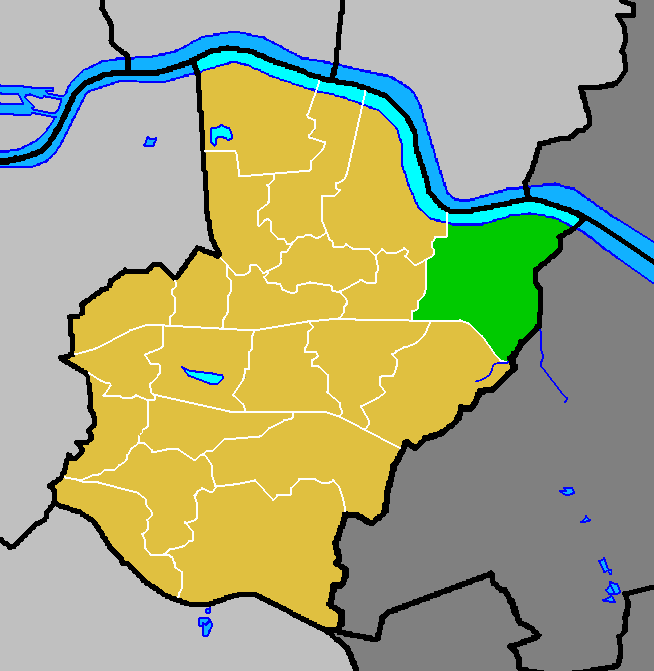
North End ward (green) within the London Borough of Bexley (yellow)

North End was an electoral ward in the London Borough of Bexley from 1978 to 2018.

It containing the localities of North End, Slade Green, and eastern Erith.

The population of the Ward at the 2011 Census was 11,566. There are approximately 4800 residences within the ward.

Ward Councillors are Alan Deadman, John Eastaugh and Brenda Langstead (all Labour). Councillor advice surgeries are held at the community centre in Slade Green.

== 2002–2018 Bexley council elections ==
There was a revision of ward boundaries in Bexley in 2002.

=== 2010 election ===
The election on 6 May 2010 took place on the same day as the United Kingdom general election.

2010 Bexley London Borough Council election: North End
Party	Candidate	Votes	%	±%
Labour	Brenda Langstead	2,039	42.5	
Labour	Stef Borella	2,007		
Labour	Alan Deadman	1,917		
Conservative	Chris Bishop	1,454	30.3	
Conservative	Christopher Tugwell	1,330		
Conservative	Andy Dourmoush	1,211		
Liberal Democrats	Heidi Barnes	685	14.3	
Liberal Democrats	Philip Codd	654		
BNP	Thomas Andrews	622	13.0	
BNP	Ivan Osbourne	533		
Turnout			53.0	
Labour hold		Swing		
Labour hold		Swing		
Labour hold		Swing		

=== 2006 election ===
The election took place on 4 May 2006.

2006 Bexley London Borough Council election: North End
Party	Candidate	Votes	%	±%
Labour	John Eastaugh	1,093	36.0	
Labour	Brenda Langstead	1,070		
Labour	Alan Deadman	962		
Conservative	Sylvia Cassells	637	21.0	
Conservative	Bernard Gillespie	601		
Independent	Simon Goding	553	18.2	
Conservative	Edgar Silvester	498		
BNP	John Bowles	481	15.9	
Liberal Democrats	William Shrimpton	269	8.9	
Turnout			31.9	
Labour hold		Swing		
Labour hold		Swing		
Labour hold		Swing		
