= Memorial Square, Springfield, Massachusetts =

Neighborhood in Springfield, Massachusetts, United States

- Memorial Square District
- U.S. National Register of Historic Places
- U.S. Historic district
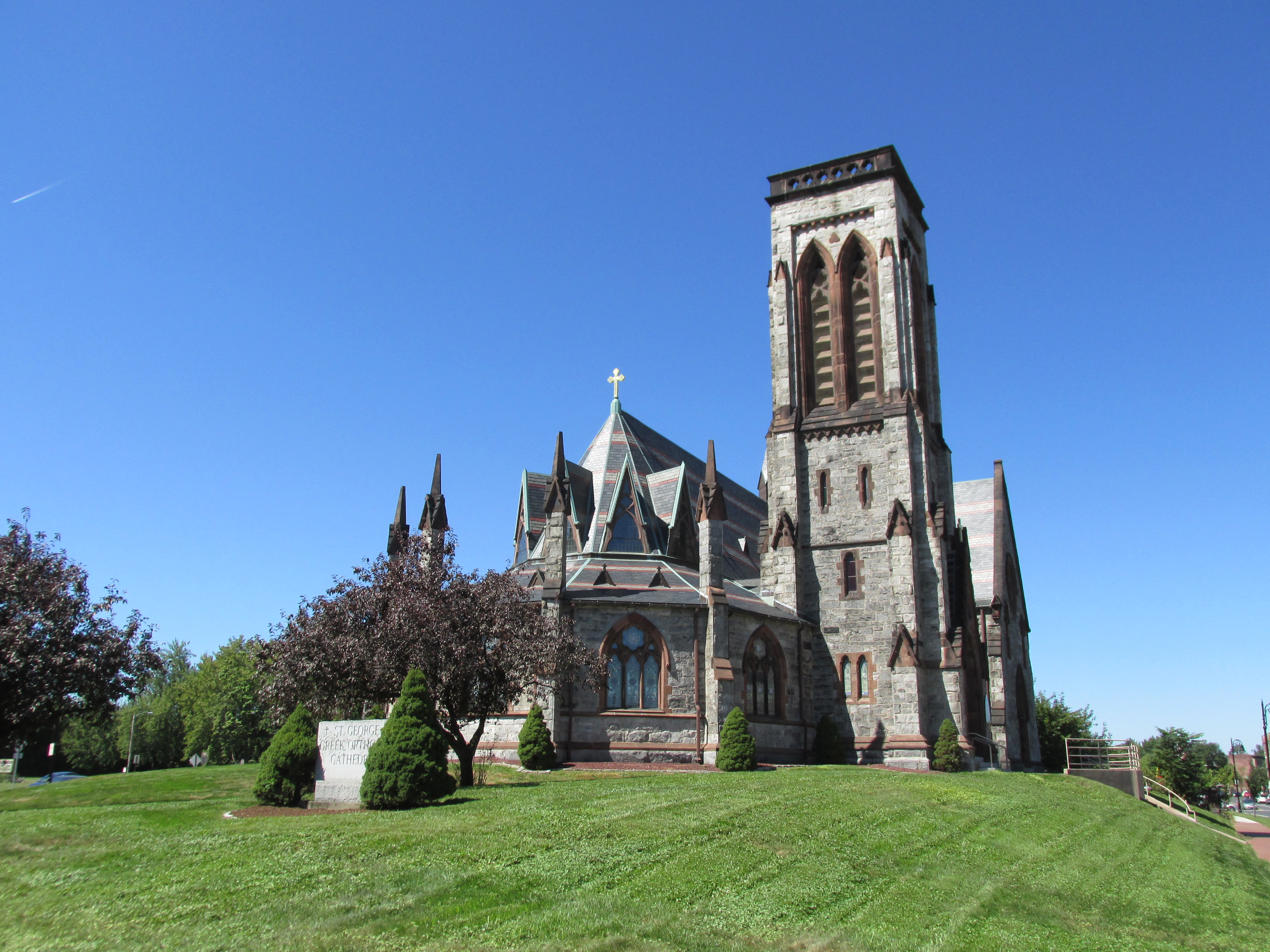
- Saint George Greek Orthodox Cathedral

- Location within Massachusetts Location within the United States
- Location: Springfield, Massachusetts
- Coordinates: 42°6′37″N 72°36′10″W
- Built: 1866
- Architect: Multiple
- Architectural style: Classical Revival, Queen Anne, Gothic Revival
- NRHP reference No.: 77000180
- Added to NRHP: August 29, 1977

Memorial Square is a neighborhood located in Springfield, Massachusetts.

A predominantly Puerto Rican neighborhood with several parks, Memorial Square is within walking distance of Springfield's three nationally ranked hospitals, Baystate Medical Center, Shriner's Children's Hospital, and Mercy Medical.

Always a neighborhood of immigrants, Memorial Square was a primarily Greek neighborhood from the Industrial Revolution until the 1980s. The architecturally notable St. George's Greek Orthodox Cathedral, founded in 1907 and built in 1940, reflects Memorial Square's past as a Greek enclave.

A portion of the neighborhood was listed on the National Register of Historic Places in 1977 as the Memorial Square District.
