= Memorial Square District =

Historic district in Massachusetts, United States

- U.S. National Register of Historic Places
- U.S. Historic district
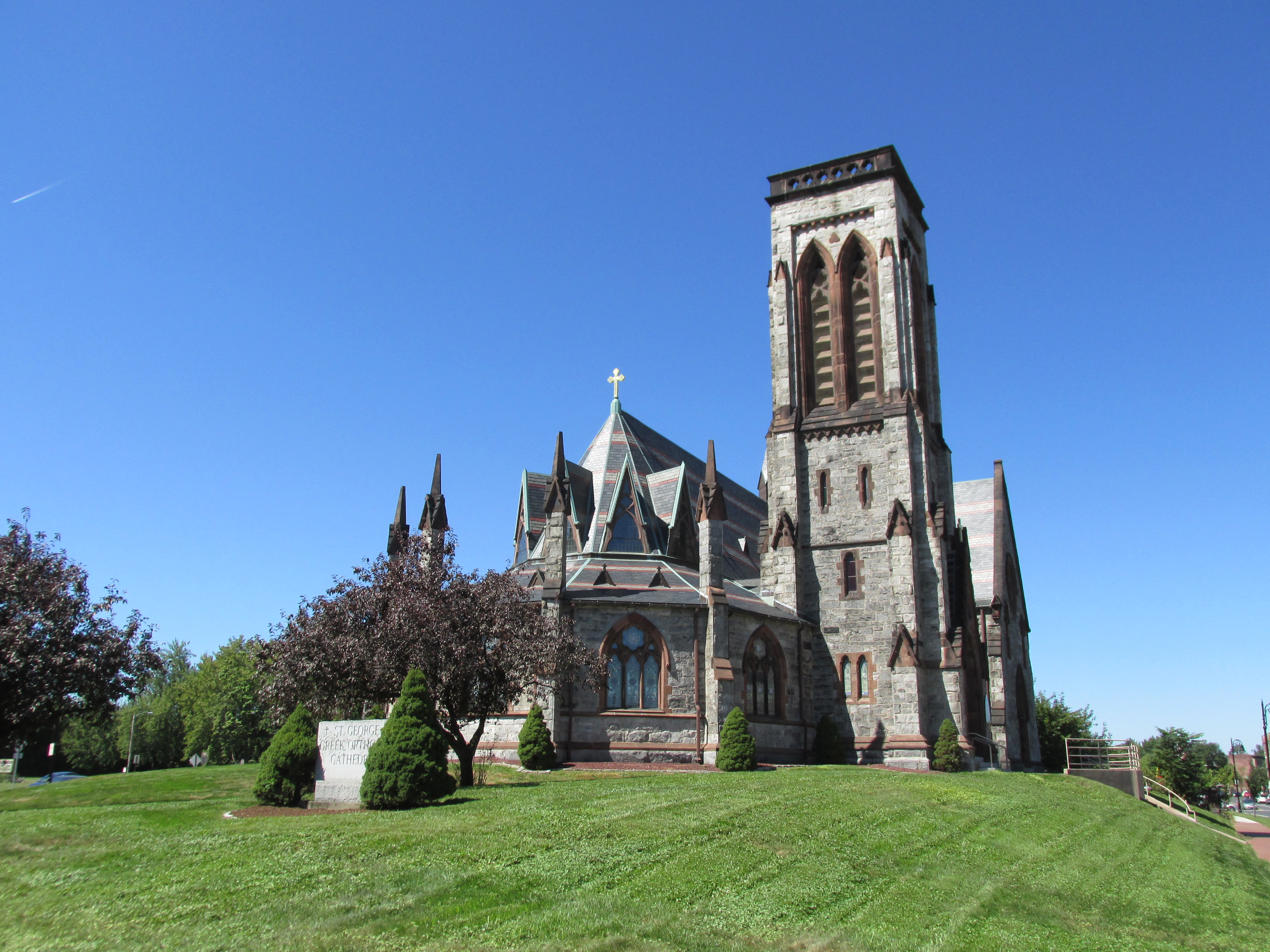
- Saint George Greek Orthodox Cathedral

- Location within Massachusetts Location within the United States
- Location: Springfield, Massachusetts
- Coordinates: 42°6′37″N 72°36′10″W
- Area: 6.5 acres (2.6 ha)
- Built: 1866
- Architect: Multiple
- Architectural style: Classical Revival, Queen Anne, Gothic Revival
- NRHP reference No.: 77000180
- Added to NRHP: August 29, 1977

The Memorial Square District encompasses the historic heart of the Memorial Square neighborhood of Springfield, Massachusetts. Arrayed around the Memorial Square at the junction of Main and Plainfield Streets are seven buildings of architectural and/or historic significance, including the Memorial Church (now St. George's Greek Orthodox Church), and the former Memorial Square Branch Library, now a Greek cultural center. It was added to the National Register of Historic Places in 1977.

== Description and history ==
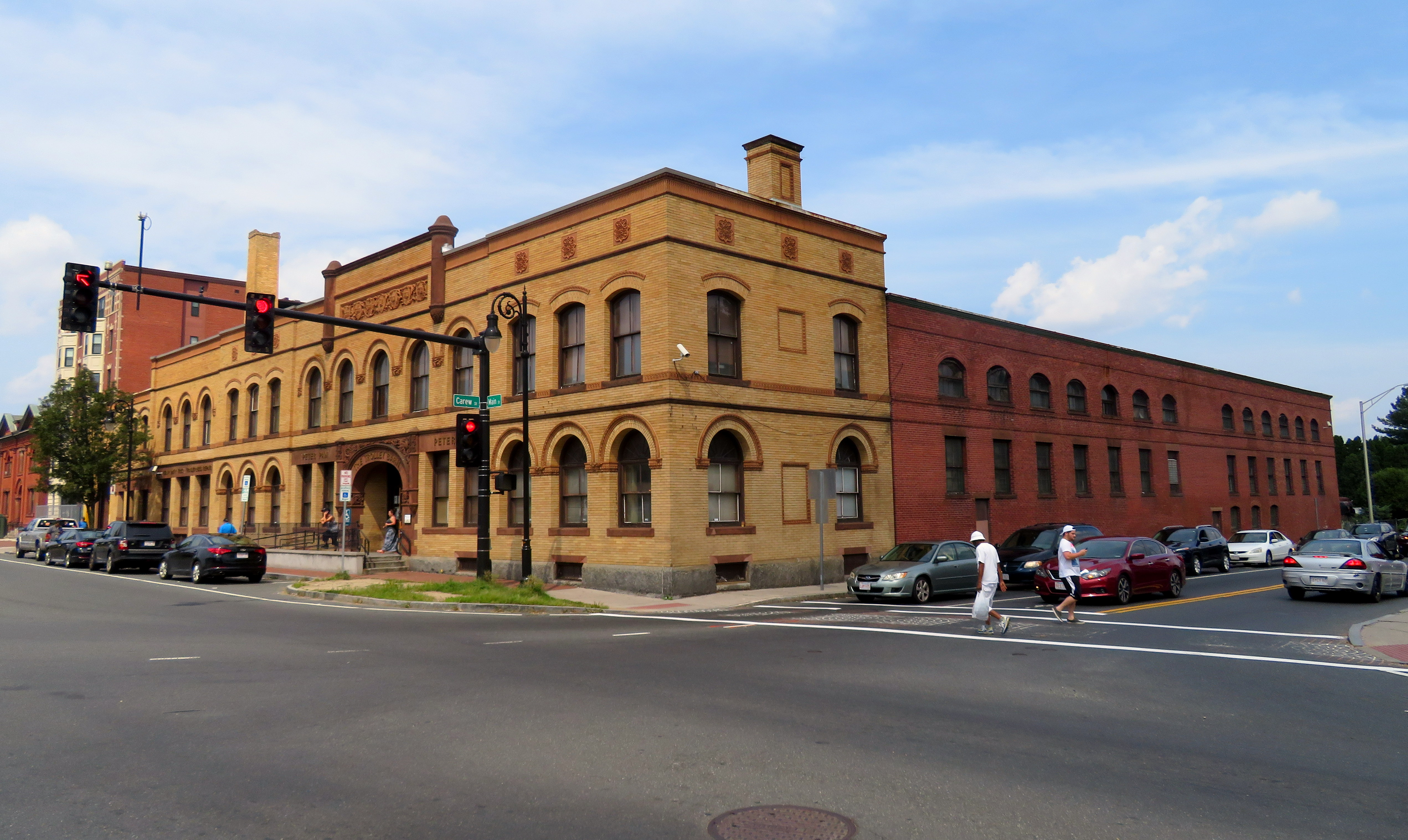
Springfield Street Railway Building in 2018

Memorial Square is now little more than a landscaped triangular area at the junction of Main and Plainfield Streets, with its northern boundary called Bradford Street. In the mid-19th century, the surrounding area was predominantly one of large estates of Springfield's business and civic elites. After the American Civil War, the area began to be developed, and the square became a focal point for civic development. The Memorial Church, which stands north of the triangular square, was built in 1866 to a design by Richard Upjohn and his son, Richard M. Upjohn; it is one of the city's architectural landmarks. On the west side of the square, the library was built in 1914 to a design by Edward Tilton of New York City; it is a significant local example of Italian Renaissance architecture.

On the east side of the square is a row of five buildings. The most southerly was built in 1897 as the trolley barn for the Springfield Street Railway, a business owned by George Atwater, one of the area's estate owners. To its north stands the Memorial Square building, at six stories the tallest facing the square; it is a primarily residential building constructed in 1911. Three houses stand to its north, two of them distinguished examples of Queen Anne architecture, as well as the Classical Revival former parish house for the Memorial Church.

== See also ==
- National Register of Historic Places listings in Springfield, Massachusetts
- National Register of Historic Places listings in Hampden County, Massachusetts
