= Bay, Springfield, Massachusetts =

Neighborhood in Springfield, Massachusetts

Coordinates: 42.122°N 72.557°W

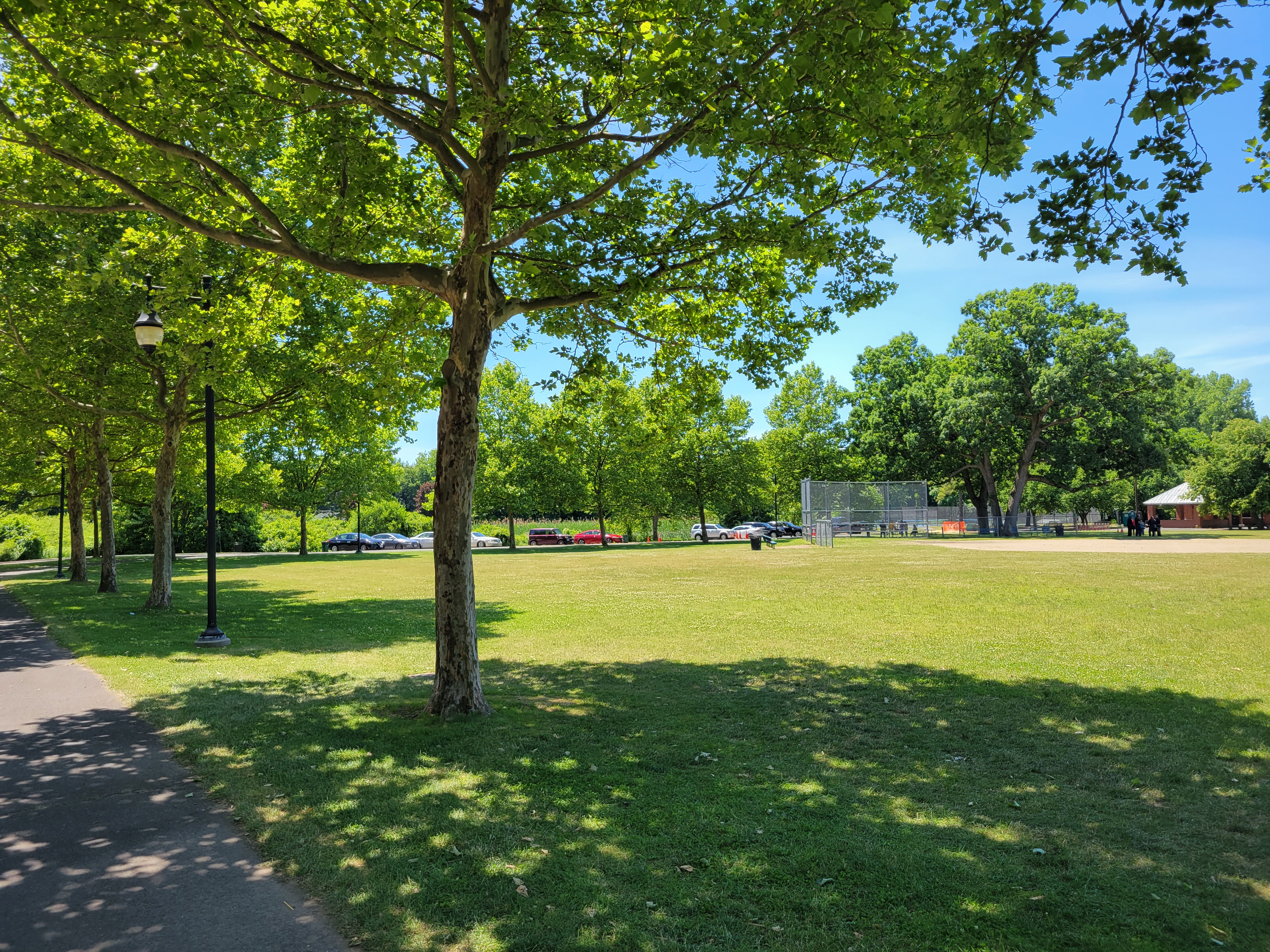
Blunt Park

The Bay neighborhood is located in Springfield, Massachusetts. It covers 556.5 acres of land, making it one of the city's smallest neighborhoods.

== Neighborhood ==
Its housing stock features Victorian architecture and brick apartment buildings.

The neighborhood contains Central High School and a portion of American International College.

== Demographics ==
In 2009 Bay was home to 4,500 residents.
