= Six Corners/Maple Heights, Springfield, Massachusetts =

Neighborhoods in Springfield, Massachusetts, United States

Coordinates: 42.0992°N 72.5728°W

The Six Corners and Maple Heights neighborhoods are located in Springfield, Massachusetts. They are often combined for political purposes, although they feature dramatically different political and socioeconomic characteristics.

The political entity known as Six Corners includes the architecturally significant Maple Heights and Ridgewood Historic Districts. Bordering the urban Metro Center neighborhood, several blocks south of Main Street, Maple Heights and the Ridgewood Historic District feature prominent mansions built along a high bluff overlooking the Connecticut River. From the 1820s until the 1910s, these districts were Springfield's streetcar suburbs and served as the city's first "Gold Coast."

Mulberry Street, a tourist spot made famous by Springfield native Dr. Seuss's first children's book, And to Think that I Saw It on Mulberry Street, allows fans to follow in the steps of a young Dr. Seuss.

Today, in these neighborhoods, one can view majestic Gilded Age mansions featuring original hand-crafted woodwork and ironwork that is unable to be replicated today. The Ridgewood District also contains Mulberry House, a 1950s futurist-style apartment building, now condominiums, with unparalleled views of Springfield's skyline. Behind Ridgewood Terrace and Mulberry House is the historic Springfield Cemetery, providing an oasis of green. Springfield's oldest private school, the MacDuffie School's historic campus is located in mansions on Maple Street.

Six Corners, the neighborhood on the northern side of Springfield Cemetery, is currently one of the city's most impoverished districts; however, the nearby Maple Heights, Ridgewood Historic District, and Mulberry Street look much as they did during the 19th century.
