= Liberty Heights, Springfield, Massachusetts =

Neighborhood in Springfield, Massachusetts, United States

Coordinates: 42°7′47.7″N 72°35′4.4″W

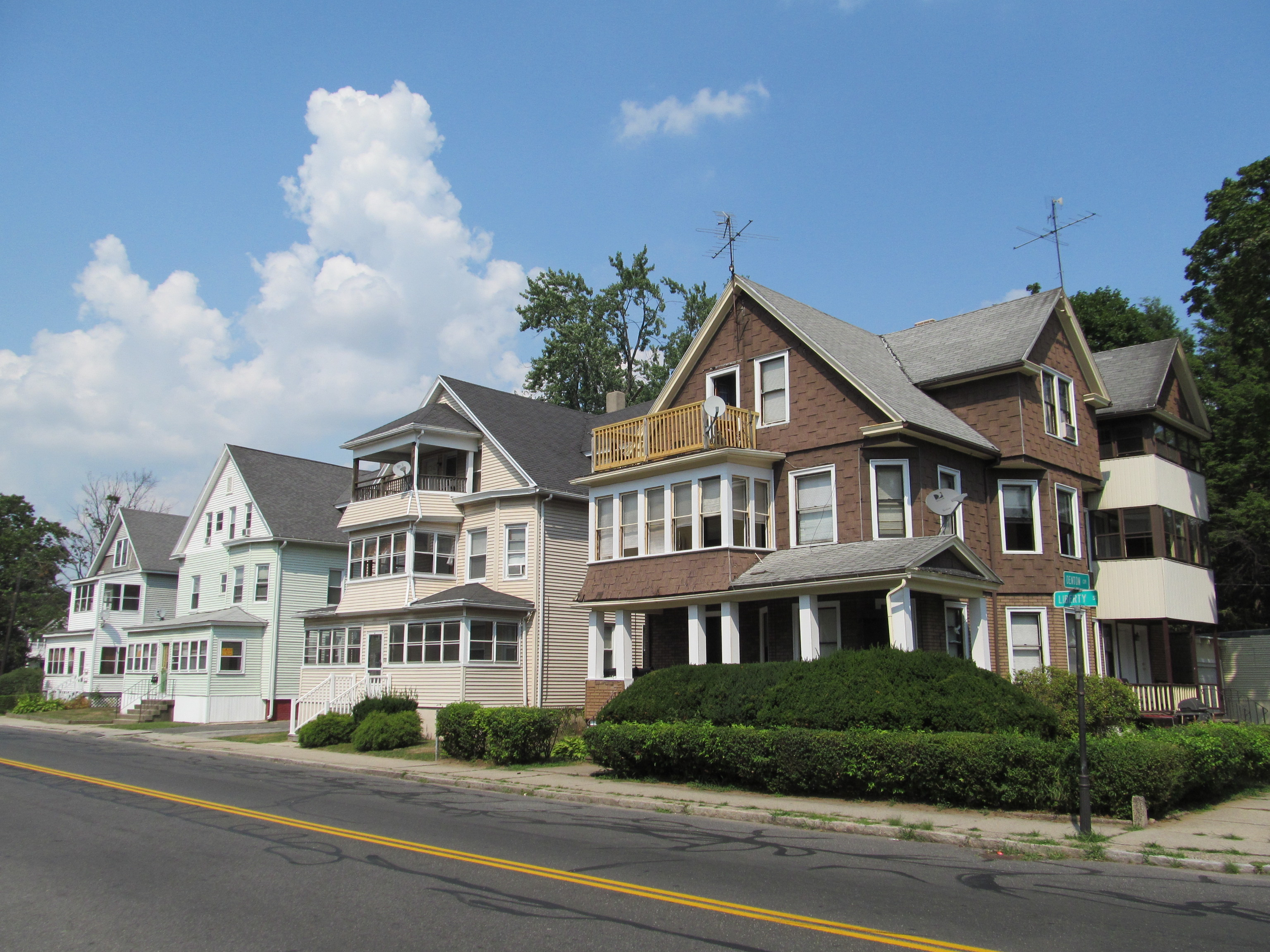
Liberty Street at Denton Circle

Liberty Heights is a neighborhood in Springfield, Massachusetts, named for its main thoroughfare of Liberty Street.

Located along Springfield's northern border, with easy access to I-291 and the Mass Turnpike (I-90), Liberty Heights is a residential neighborhood full of a variety of 20th-century housing types, such as: Craftsman, Colonial Revival, Tudor Revival, Cape Cods, and ranches. Liberty Heights has a branch library that offers a wide variety of family activities.

The neighborhood is home to Van Horn Park, one of the city's largest public parks, the Liberty Plaza shopping center, Salerno Pizzeria, and some of the city's largest employers, such as Baystate Medical Center and Smith & Wesson. The Liberty Heights neighborhoods are also close to Elms College in Chicopee. The combined studios of ABC affiliate WGGB and CBS affiliate WSHM-LD are in the area, across the street from Springfield Plaza, the former site of the Springfield Airport.

In addition to the public and parochial schools in these neighborhoods, the private Academy Hill School serves students in grades K–8.
