= South End, Springfield, Massachusetts =

Neighborhood in Springfield, Massachusetts, United States

Coordinates: 42°5′53.8″N 72°35′0.1″W

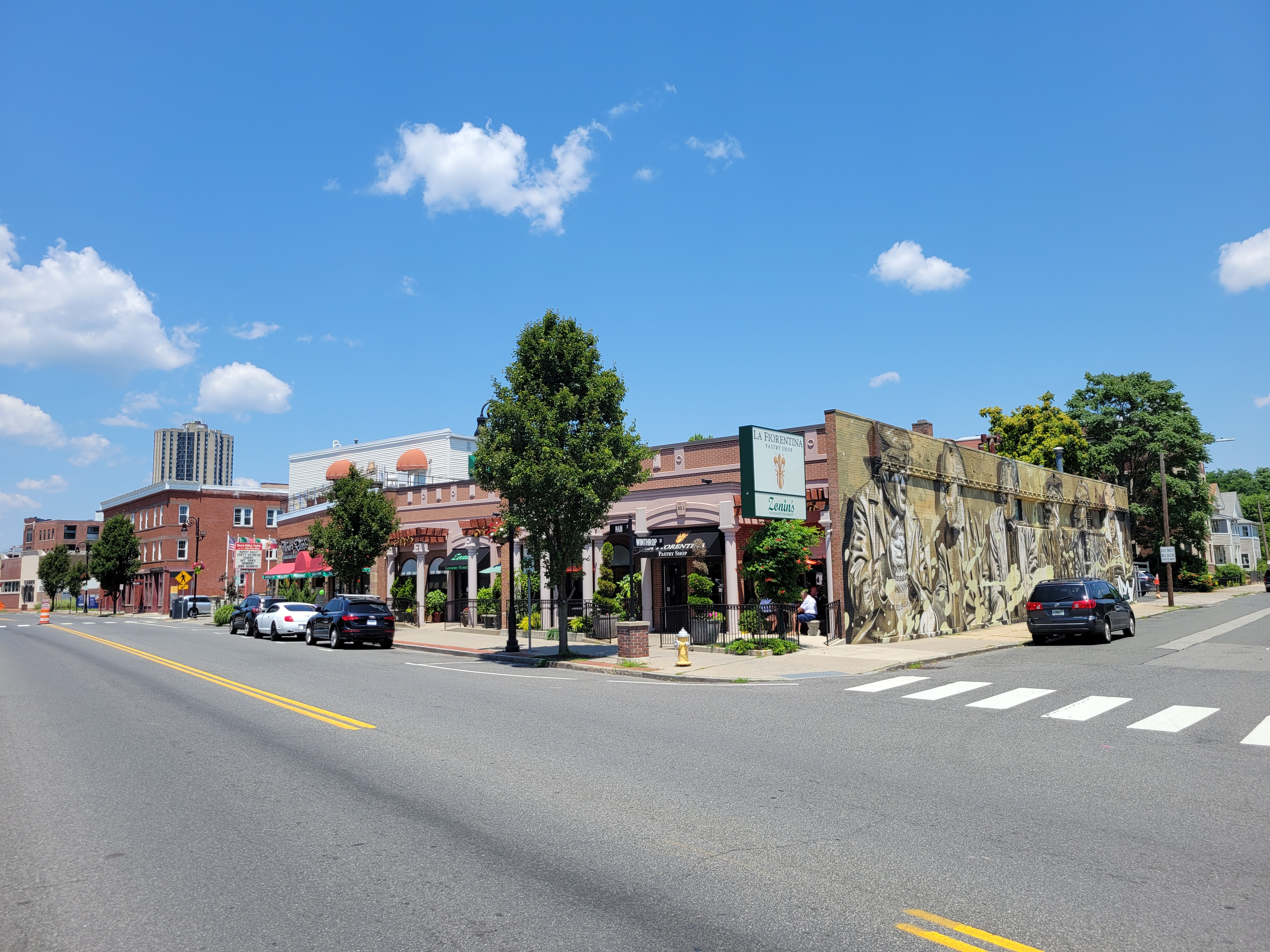
La Fiorentina Pastry Shop

South End is a neighborhood in the city of Springfield, Massachusetts. Interstate 91 separates it from the Connecticut River and the Basketball Hall of Fame museum and entertainment complex.

The South End has long been home to Springfield's Italian community, and it remains so today. In the South End, one will find numerous Italian restaurants and pastry shops, e.g. Red Rose Pizzeria, Frigo's, Mom and Rico's, and La Fiorentina, among many others.

During the summer, as in New York City and Boston, Springfield's South End Italians celebrate the annual Catholic Feast Days. In Springfield, the South End's largest annual feast day is the annual Our Lady of Mount Carmel Festival, at which attendees can purchase many different kinds of Italian food.
