= Pine Point, Springfield, Massachusetts =

Coordinates: 42°7′15.2″N 72°31′47.9″W

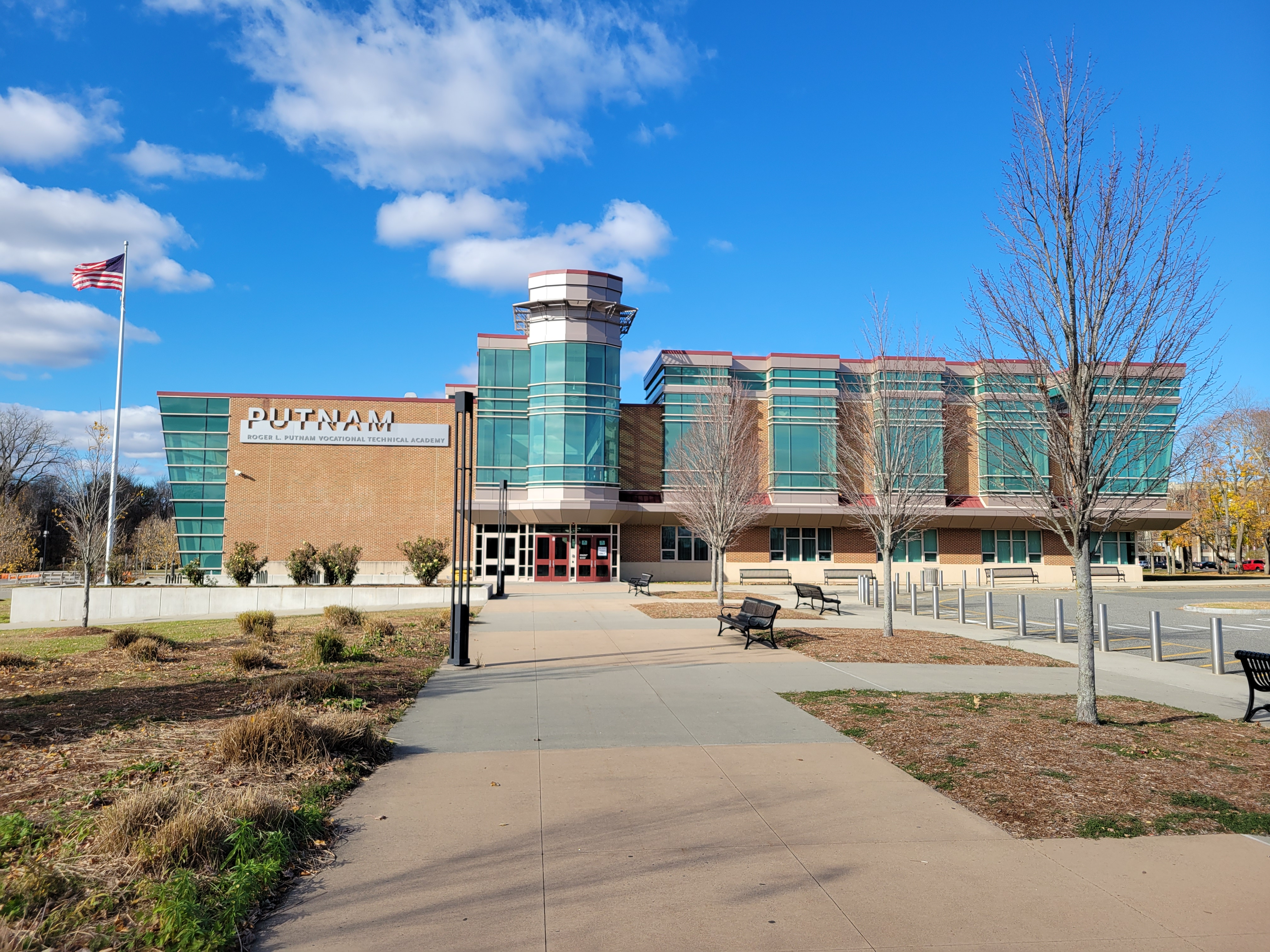
Putnam Vocational Technical High School

Pine Point is a neighborhood in Springfield, Massachusetts. Located along Boston Road -- one of Springfield's commercial thoroughfares, was home to the Eastfield Mall -- the middle-class Pine Point neighborhoods features streets of cozy capes and ranches as well as some of the most interesting Craftsman style bungalows in the region.

The neighborhood features Pine Point Library and city parks surrounding Five Mile Pond and Loon Pond, providing places to swim, fish, boat, and picnic. The High School of Science & Technology and Putnam Vocational High School are found in this neighborhood.

The headquarters of MassMutual, a Fortune 100 company - one of Massachusetts' top 2 companies by $billions of earnings - is located on State Street in the Pine Point neighborhood.
