= East Springfield, Springfield, Massachusetts =

Neighborhood in Springfield, Massachusetts, United States

Coordinates: 42°8′29.8″N 72°33′29.7″W

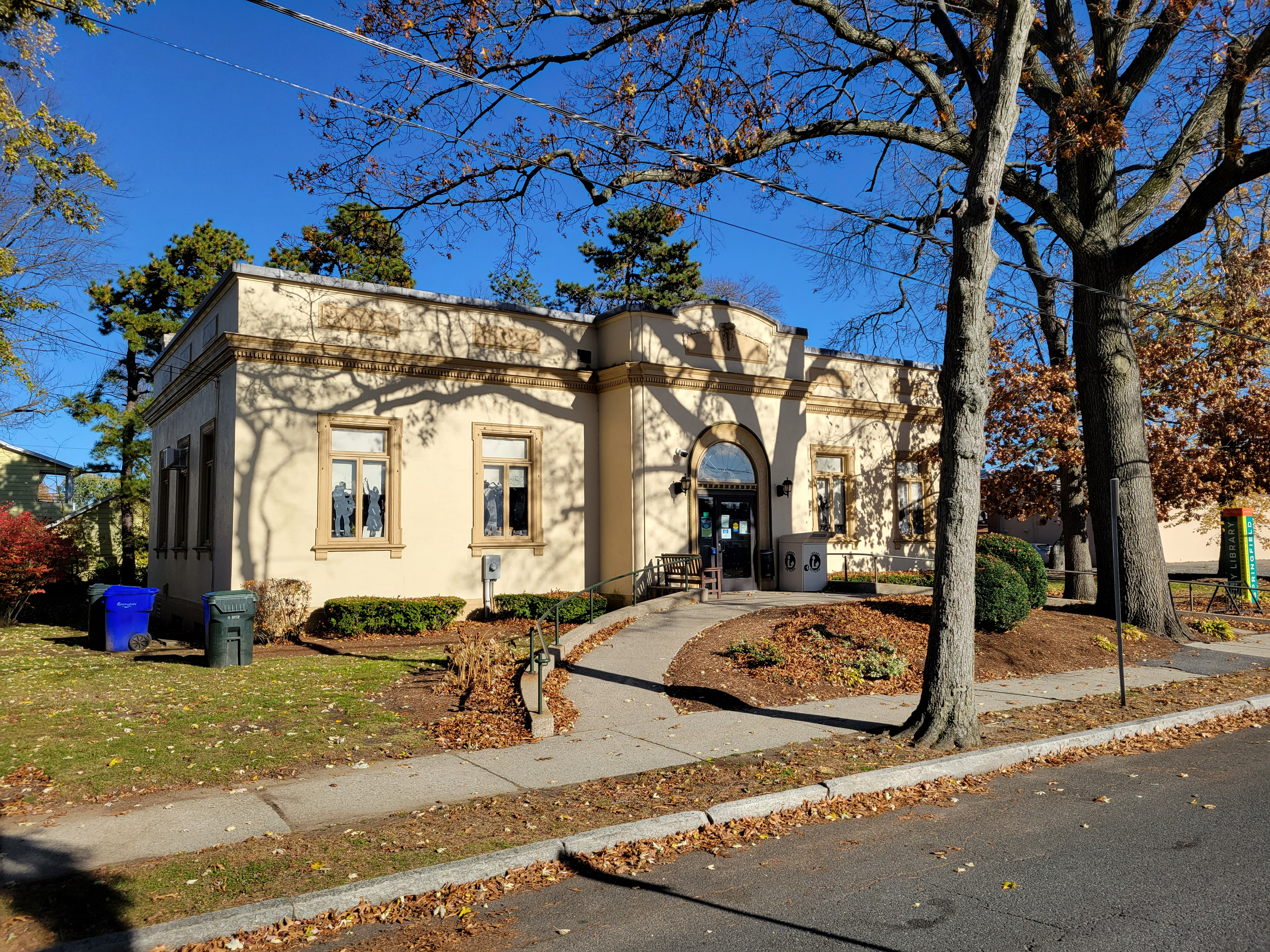
East Springfield Branch Library

East Springfield is a neighborhood located in Springfield, Massachusetts.

East Springfield sits along Springfield's northern border, with easy access to I-291 and the Mass Turnpike (I-90). East Springfield is a residential neighborhood full of a variety of 20th-century housing types, such as: Craftsman, Colonial Revival, Tudor Revival, Capes, and Ranches. East Springfield has a branch library that offers a wide variety of family activities.

East Springfield is home to some of the city's largest employers, such as Smith & Wesson. The neighborhood is also close to Elms College in Chicopee.
