= Slade Green and Northend =

Electoral ward in Bexley, London, England

- Electoral ward for the Bexley London Borough Council
- Borough: Bexley
- County: Greater London
- Population: 12,749 (2021)
- Area: 4.427 km²

Current electoral ward
- Created: 2018
- Councillors: 2

Slade Green and Northend is an electoral ward in the London Borough of Bexley. The ward was first used in the 2018 elections. It elects two councillors to Bexley London Borough Council.

== Geography ==
The ward is named after the suburbs of Slade Green and North End.

== Councillors ==
Election	Councillors	
2018	Stefano Borella (Labour)	Brenda Langstead (Labour)
2022	Stefano Borella (Labour)	Anna Day (Labour)

== Elections ==
=== 2022 ===
Slade Green and Northend (2 seats)
Party	Candidate	Votes	%	±%
Labour	Stefano Borella*	1,220	62.6	+8.7
Labour	Anna Day	1,213	62.3	
Conservative	Michael Gillespie	764	39.2	
Conservative	Mandy Brinkhurst	700	35.9	
Turnout		3,897	24.3	−5.46
Labour hold		Swing		
Labour hold		Swing		

=== 2018 ===
Slade Green & Northend (2)
Party	Candidate	Votes	%	±%
Labour	Brenda Langstead	1,291	53.9	
Labour	Stefano Borella	1,272	53.1	
Conservative	Graham D'Amiral	668	27.9	
Conservative	Viny Poon	575	24.0	
UKIP	Mac McGannon	305	12.7	
Green	Sophie Chaise	289	12.1	
Turnout		2,409	29.8	
Labour win (new seat)				
Labour win (new seat)				
