= North End Historic District =

North End Historic District can refer to:

- North End Historic District (Colorado Springs, Colorado), listed on the NRHP in Colorado
- North End Historic District (Westerly, Rhode Island), listed on the NRHP in Rhode Island
- North End Historic District (Woonsocket, Rhode Island), listed on the NRHP in Rhode Island
- North End Historic District (Newport News, Virginia), listed on the NRHP in Virginia
