= Old Hill, Springfield, Massachusetts =

Neighborhood in Springfield, Massachusetts, United States

Coordinates: 42°6′15.3″N 72°34′4.2″W

Old Hill is one of the seventeen neighborhoods of Springfield, Massachusetts. It is composed, almost entirely, of Victorian buildings overlooking Springfield's Metro Center.

At the start of the twenty-first century, the Old Hill neighborhood struggled to maintain its vitality. Drugs and traffic had become a problem. Despite that, Old Hill had neighborhood groups and committed residents, numerous religious organizations, supportive neighborhood businesses, and Springfield College, all of which banded together to revitalize the neighborhood. Currently, crime is down 50%, and many of Old Hill's "Painted Lady" Victorians are being restored.
