= Brightwood, Springfield, Massachusetts =

Neighborhood in Springfield, Massachusetts, United States

Coordinates: 42°7′5.1″N 72°36′49.6″W

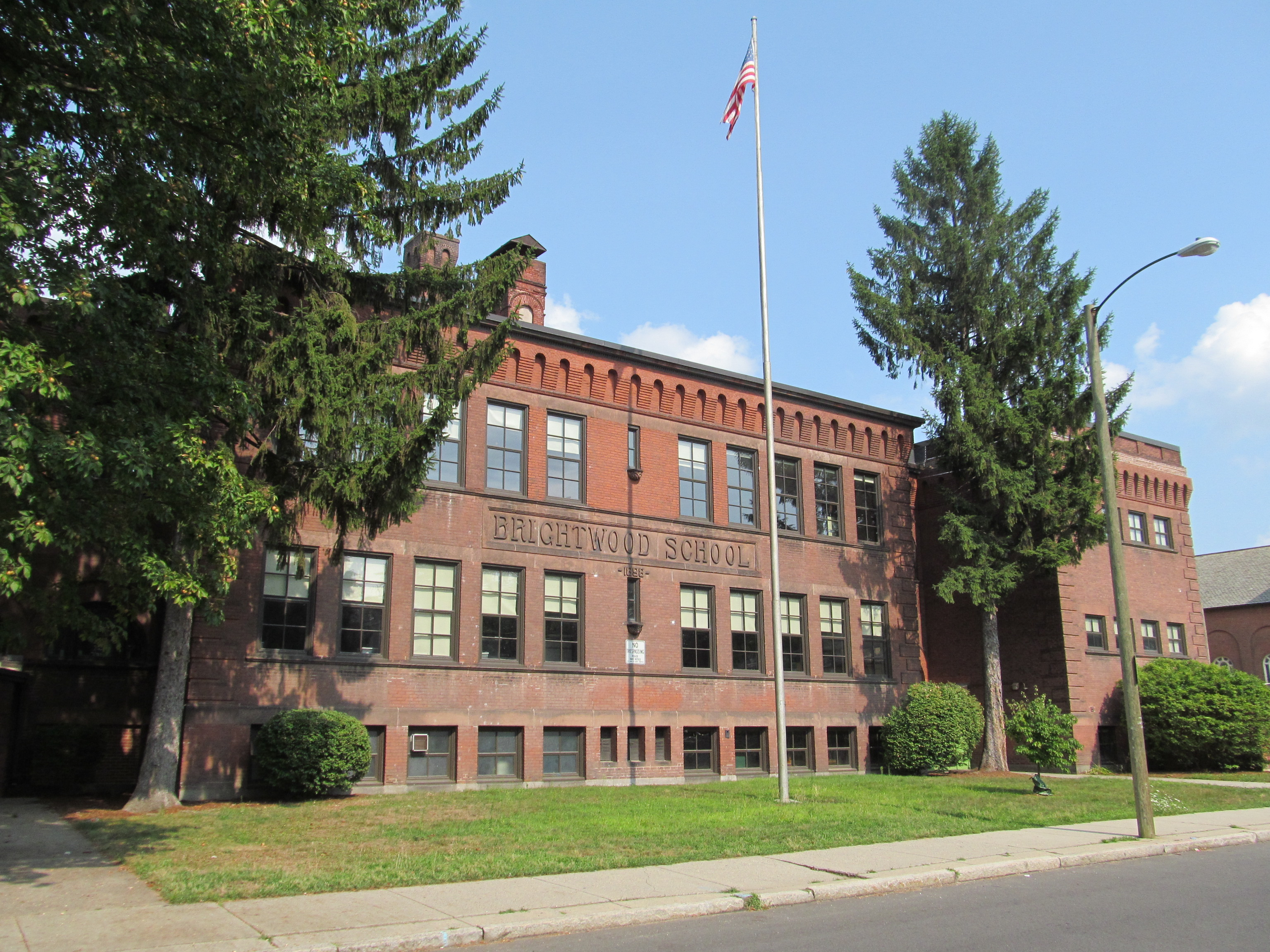
Brightwood School

The Brightwood neighborhood of Springfield, Massachusetts, is located in the northwest corner of the city, along the Connecticut River; however, it is separated from the rest of Springfield by the Interstate 91 elevated highway. Many recent academic papers at the University of Massachusetts Amherst' School of Urban Design have focused on the detrimental physical and sociological effects that Interstate 91 has had on the Brightwood neighborhood and on Springfield in general.

Much of Brightwood was destroyed during the 1936 and 1938 Connecticut River Floods, thus it features housing stock from the Works Progress Administration rebuilding period. Geographically, Brightwood is the second smallest of Springfield's seventeen neighborhoods. It contains 234 acres of land, plus streets and railroads. Its boundaries are well defined: the Chicopee city line to the north; Clinton Street to the south; the B & M Railroad to the east; and the Connecticut River to the west. Its demographics have changed exponentially during the last two censuses. It is now over 80% Puerto Rican and a center of Springfield's Puerto Rican community.
