= Baystate Mercy Hospital =

- Baystate Health

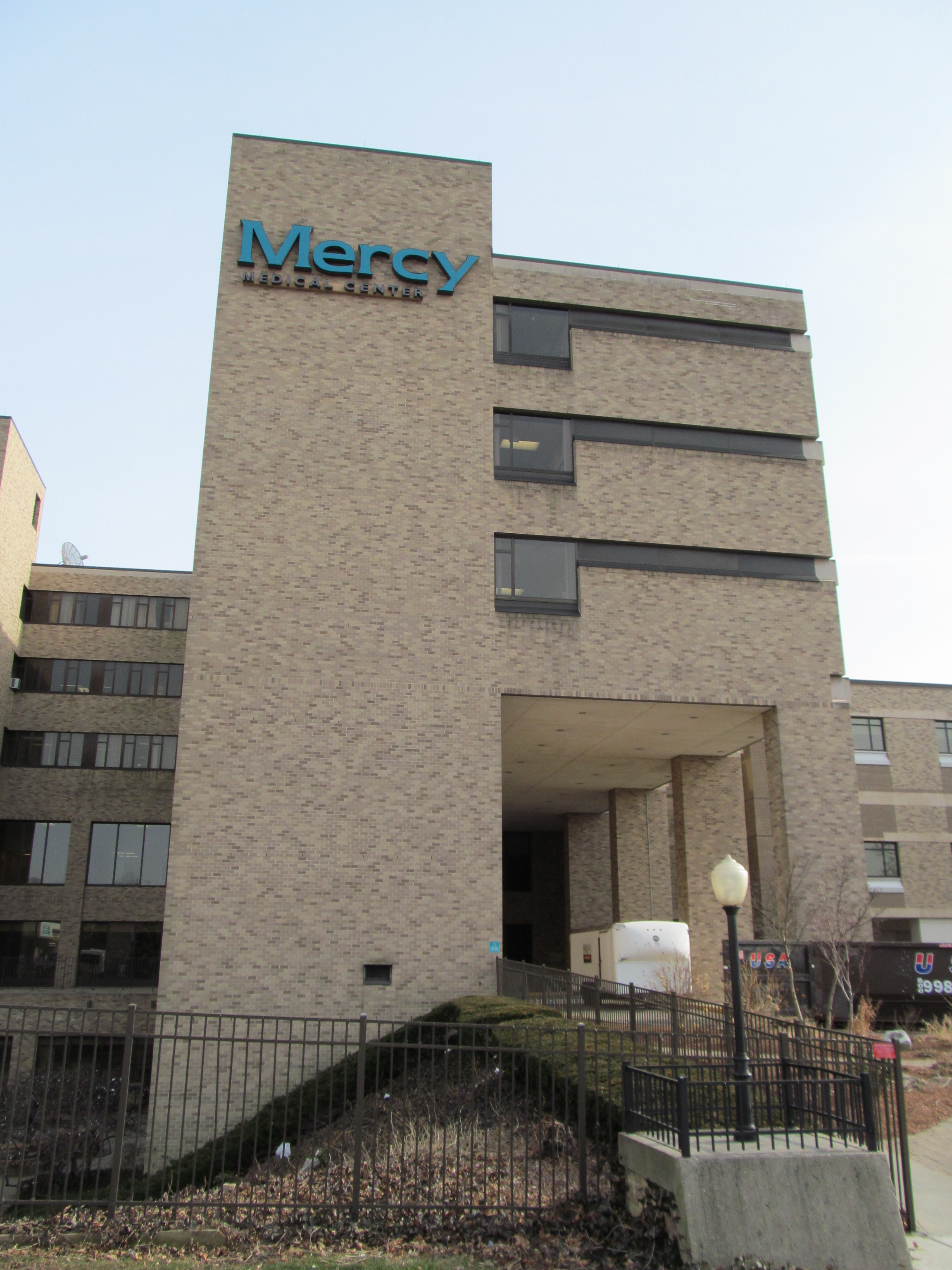

- Location within Massachusetts

Geography
- Location: Springfield, Massachusetts, United States
- Coordinates: 42.115532°N 72.593679°W

Organization
- Care system: Private
- Type: Community

Services
- Beds: 301

History
- Founded: November 7, 1873

Links
- Website: www.trinityhealthofne.org/location/mercy-medical-center-1
- Lists: Hospitals in the United States

Baystate Mercy Hospital (formerly Mercy Medical Center) is a community hospital located in Springfield, Massachusetts. Founded by the Sisters of Providence Health System, Mercy Hospital is a faith-based, non-profit organization serving patients regardless of background or beliefs. Mercy Medical Center is known for its tradition of holistic health care.

As of 2011, Mercy Medical Center is ranked among the Top 100 Community Value Hospitals by Cleverley & Associates.

In 2026, Baystate Health entered into a definitive agreement (pending regulatory approval) to integrate Mercy Medical Center as Baystate Mercy Hospital into the Baystate hierarchy, along with several other Mercy locations.

== Mission ==
Like other hospitals in the Sisters of Providence Health System, (a member of Catholic Health East), Mercy is a community of persons committed to serving citizens of the Knowledge Corridor metropolitan area. Mercy Medical Center advocate public policies and initiatives in line with the Catholic faith.

== History ==
Today's Sisters of Providence originated from another community of religious women, the Sisters of Providence of St. Vincent de Paul in Kingston, Ontario, Canada.

In September 1873, two Sisters from the Canadian community approached Reverend Patrick J. Harkins, pastor of Holyoke, Massachusetts' St. Jerome's Church, asking permission to solicit funds from his parishioners. Reverend Harkins granted the request, he in turn asked the Sisters to petition their superiors to send others from their community to establish a Holyoke mission. He wanted the new mission to address the needs of the rapidly growing poor Irish and Scottish immigrant mill workers in the Holyoke community.

On November 7, 1873, four Sisters arrived to establish the Holyoke mission. Within a week they accepted the first orphan to their House of Providence and it was not long before city officials were sending the needy and infirm to them for care and shelter. In 1874, the Sisters of Providence established the first Catholic hospital in western Massachusetts. Today's Springfield-based Mercy Medical Center developed from this small start as the "House of Providence."

In 1998, Pittsburgh Mercy Health System, Sisters of Providence Health System, and Allegany merged to form Catholic Health East. Catholic Health East merged with Trinity Health in 2013. Sisters of Providence Health System merged with St. Francis Care to form Trinity Health of New England in 2015.

On April 28, 2026: Baystate Health and Trinity Health of New England signed the initial definitive agreement for the takeover of the hospital. The transaction underwent state regulatory reviews, including a formal Determination of Need process through the Massachusetts Department of Public Health. The state okayed the takeover on September 9th. In October of 2026, Mercy began the transition to become a Baystate Health hospital. On November 1st, the hospital operations became known as "Baystate Mercy Hospital".

== Services provided ==
Services	Condition
Inpatient	Birthing center, End-of-life care, Infection isolation, Cancer care, and Psychiatric care
Outpatient	Bariatric/weight control services, Breast cancer screening/mammograms, Chemotherapy, Extracorporeal shock wave lithotripsy, Geriatric services, Home health services, Physical rehabilitation, Psychiatric services, Sleep center, Stop-smoking program, Substance-abuse programs, Urgent-care center, Women's health center, and Wound management services
Imaging services	CT scanner, Diagnostic radioisotope facility, Magnetic resonance imaging, Multislice spiral CT, Single photon emission CT, and Ultrasound
Community outreach	Health fairs and Health screenings
Patient/Family support services	Patient support groups, Transportation for elderly/handicapped, Translation services, Cancer services, and Chaplaincy/pastoral care services

== Facilities and current operations ==
=== Mercy Continuing Care Network ===
Mercy Continuing Care Network comprises six skilled nursing facilities, including two residential care facilities and an independent living facility. The network has Western Massachusetts’ second largest home care agency, a hospice agency, an adult day health program, a Program of All-Inclusive Care for the Elderly (PACE), and an in-home private duty support program.

==== Nursing care facilities ====
In addition to offering specialized nursing care, each facility within the Mercy Continuing Care Network provides an array of social and cultural events to keep residents mentally alert and physically active. Facilities and services cover a wide geographic area with locations in Springfield Westfield Turners Falls, and Holyoke. Each nursing care facility is accredited by the Joint Commission on Accreditation of Healthcare Organizations.

=== Sister Caritas Cancer Center ===
The original cancer center opened in 2003 and was named after Sister Caritas, for her desire and mission to help cancer patients with a local treatment facility.

In the spring of 2014, ground was broken on a new $15 million treatment center that will be two levels and offer 32 infusion bays to provide more than 30,00 treatments for cancer patients each year. The facility is scheduled to open in 2016.

=== Medical office building ===
In 2014, a new $20 million medical office building opened in the medical center area. The 75,000-square-foot facility will house the Mercy Hearing Center, the Weldon Rehabilitation Hospital's outpatient rehabilitation programs, and two Mercy-affiliated neurosurgery and orthopedic physician practices. Hampden County Physician Associates will also consolidate some of its other offices into the building.

== See also ==
- List of hospitals in Massachusetts
