= North End, Bexley =

Neighbourhood in the London Borough of Bexley

Coordinates: 51.474°N 0.177°E

North End
- Location within Greater London
- OS grid reference: TQ525765
- London borough: Bexley
- Ceremonial county: Greater London
- Region: London
- Country: England
- Sovereign state: United Kingdom
- Post town: ERITH
- Postcode district: DA8
- Dialling code: 01322
- Police: Metropolitan
- Fire: London
- Ambulance: London
- UK Parliament: Bexleyheath and Crayford
- London Assembly: Bexley and Bromley

North End is a name for a neighbourhood in the London Borough of Bexley and the term is of fading use. It was originally a hamlet or farmstead towards the north of the parish of Crayford, a parish founded by the early Middle Ages and which continues in the Church of England.

North End has largely been absorbed by the sprawl of neighbouring communities. It previously covered an area either side of what is now North End Road, between Colyers Lane and Boundary Street, and included Myrtle Farm. Samuel Lewis's 1848 book "A Topographical Dictionary of England" states that Northend was a hamlet with 191 people.

Bus routes 89 and route 428 serve the area and Southeastern trains serve Slade Green railway station on the North Kent Line from Dartford to London.

== Politics and government ==
The North End electoral ward covered a wider area of the London Borough of Bexley than the neighbourhood of the same name. The ward existed between 1978 and 2018. Since 2018, North End has been part of the Slade Green and Northend ward for elections to Bexley London Borough Council.

North End is part of the Bexleyheath and Crayford constituency for elections to the House of Commons of the United Kingdom, represented by Daniel Francis of the Labour Party since 2024.
