= Sixteen Acres =

Neighborhood in Springfield, Massachusetts, United States

Coordinates: 42°6′56.0″N 72°31′11.0″W

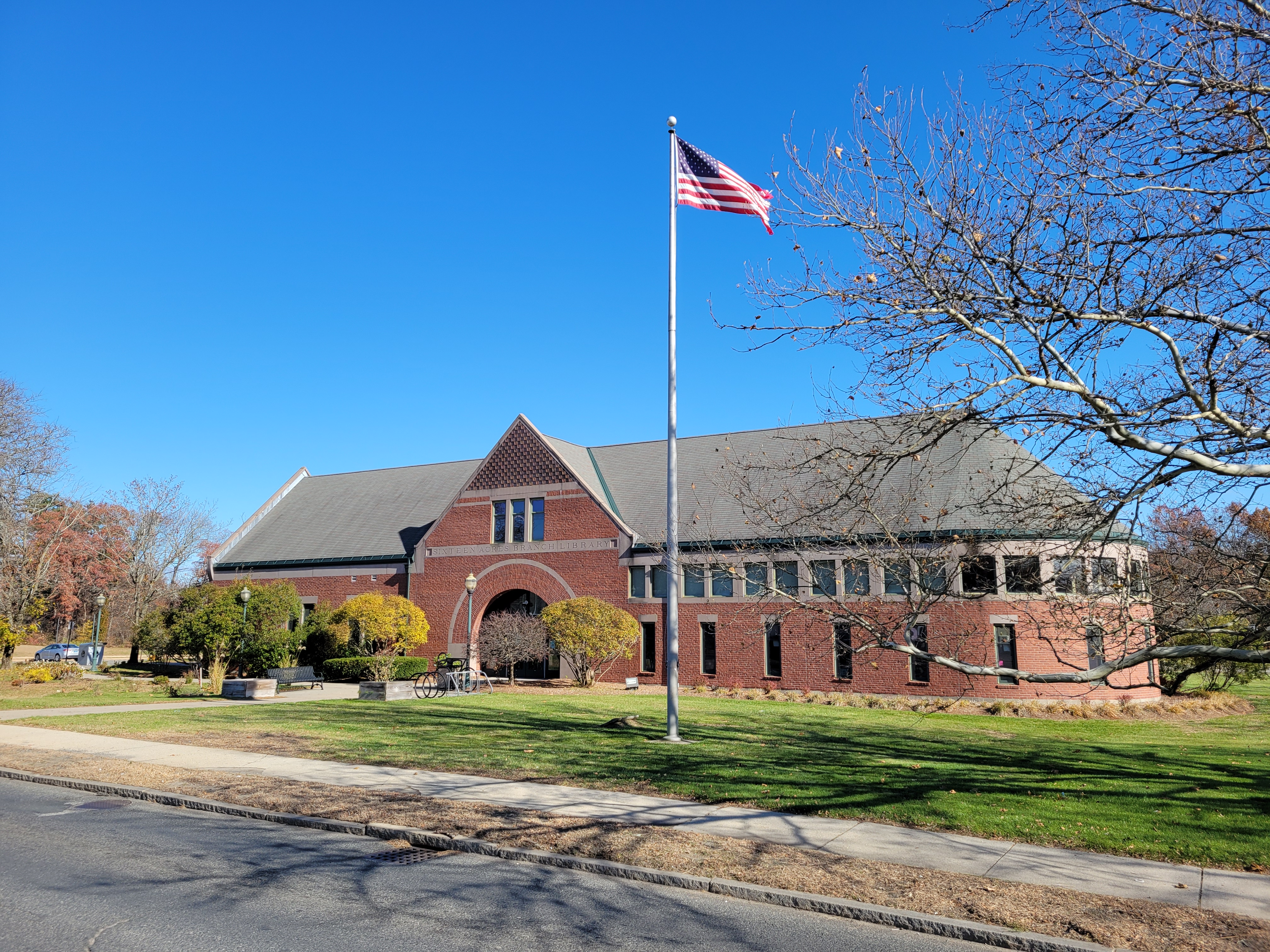
Sixteen Acres Branch Library

Sixteen Acres is a neighborhood in Springfield, Massachusetts. Much of the neighborhood was constructed after World War II and is suburban in character. Unlike what its name might suggest, the neighborhood covers 4,506 acres.

== Neighborhood ==
Sixteen Acres includes Western New England University, SABIS International High School, Pioneer Valley Christian Academy, and the 18-hole Veterans Memorial Golf Course. Besides streets of newer ranches, colonials, split-levels, and capes, the neighborhood has large condominium complexes on Nassau Drive.

Sixteen Acres also features the 28-acre (11 ha) Greenleaf Park, the Greenleaf community center, a branch library, and two private beach clubs (Bass Pond and the Paddle Club). Commercial clusters on Wilbraham Road and Allen Street provide shopping.

Sixteen Acres residents have a quick drive to East Longmeadow's employers, such as Hasbro and American Saw, as well as a short drive up Parker Street to the Massachusetts Turnpike.

== History ==
In the early 1900s, Theodore Granger (after whom Granger Street is named) bought a parcel of land which was 16 acres in size in pursuit of his dream to become a farmer. His skills at farming were less than his skills as a carpenter, and the farm did not thrive, but parcels of land were given to family members and also sold.

The residents of the area were largely isolated from the rest of Springfield, as no public transportation served the area.

The area remained largely rural until after World War II.
