= Upper Hill, Springfield, Massachusetts =

Neighborhood in Springfield, Massachusetts

Upper Hill, Massachusetts
- Neighborhood
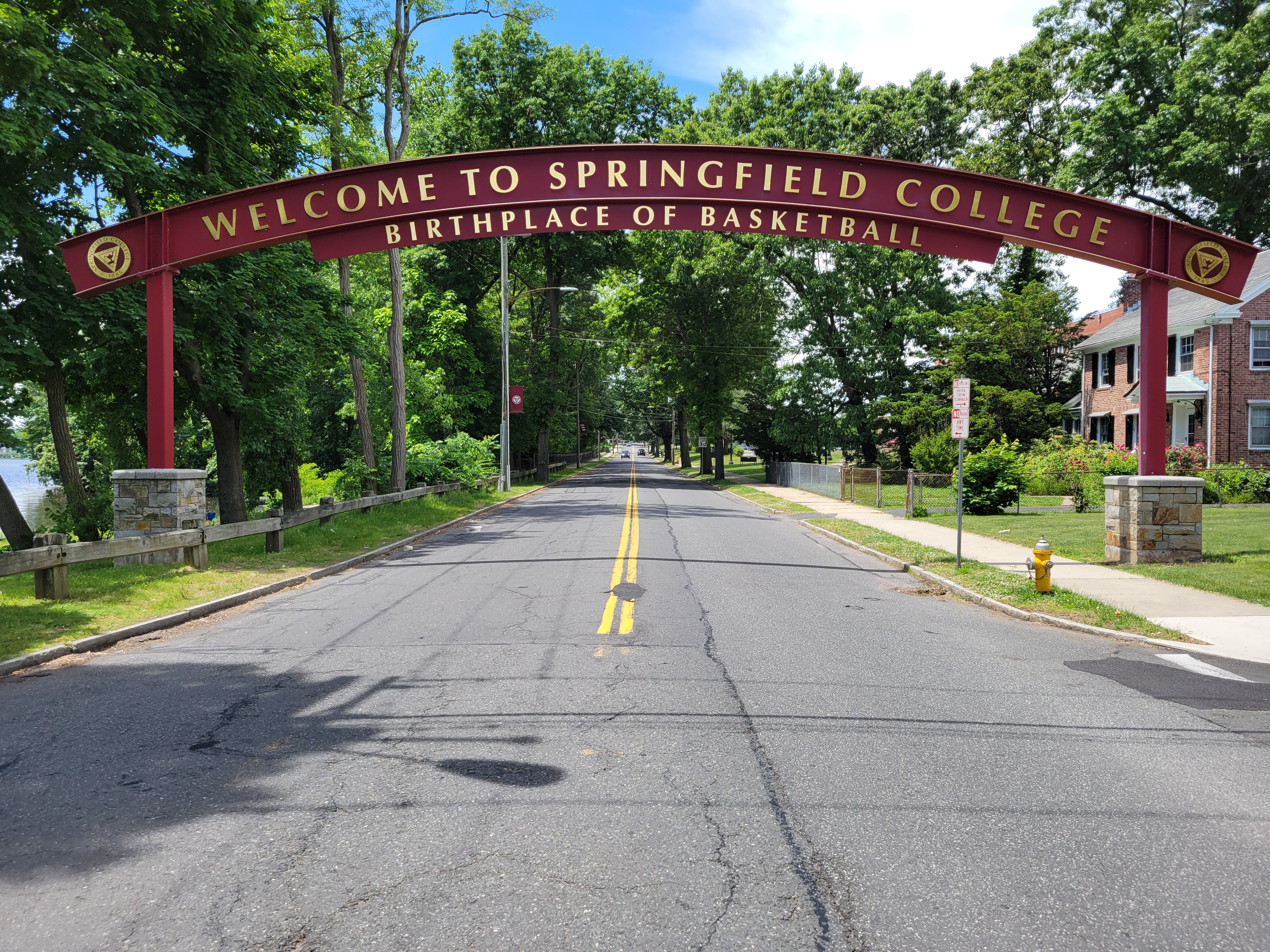
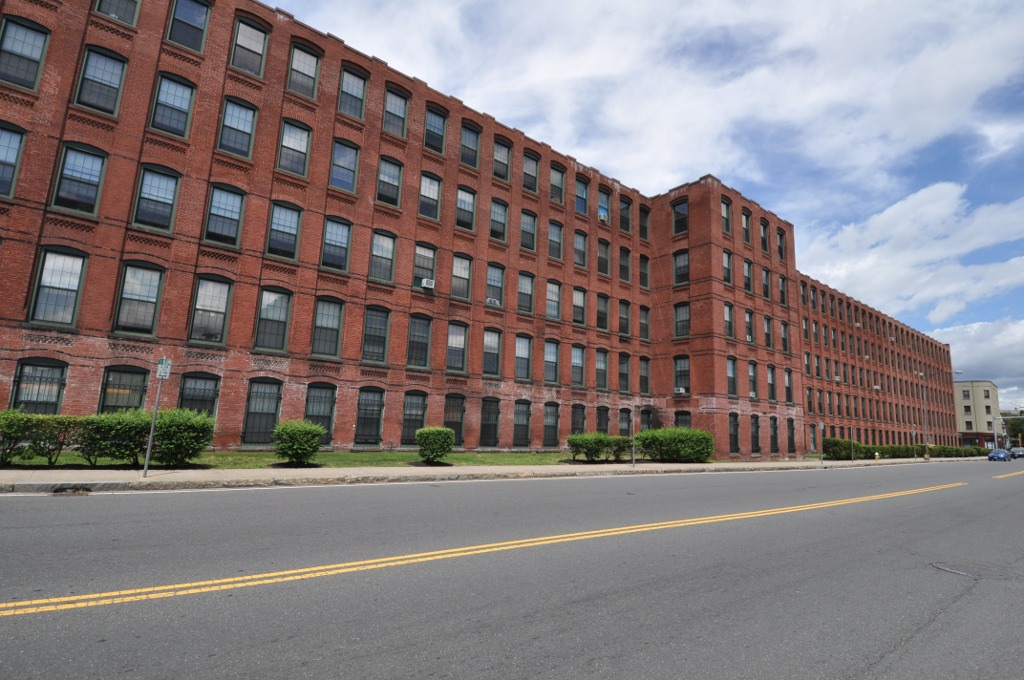
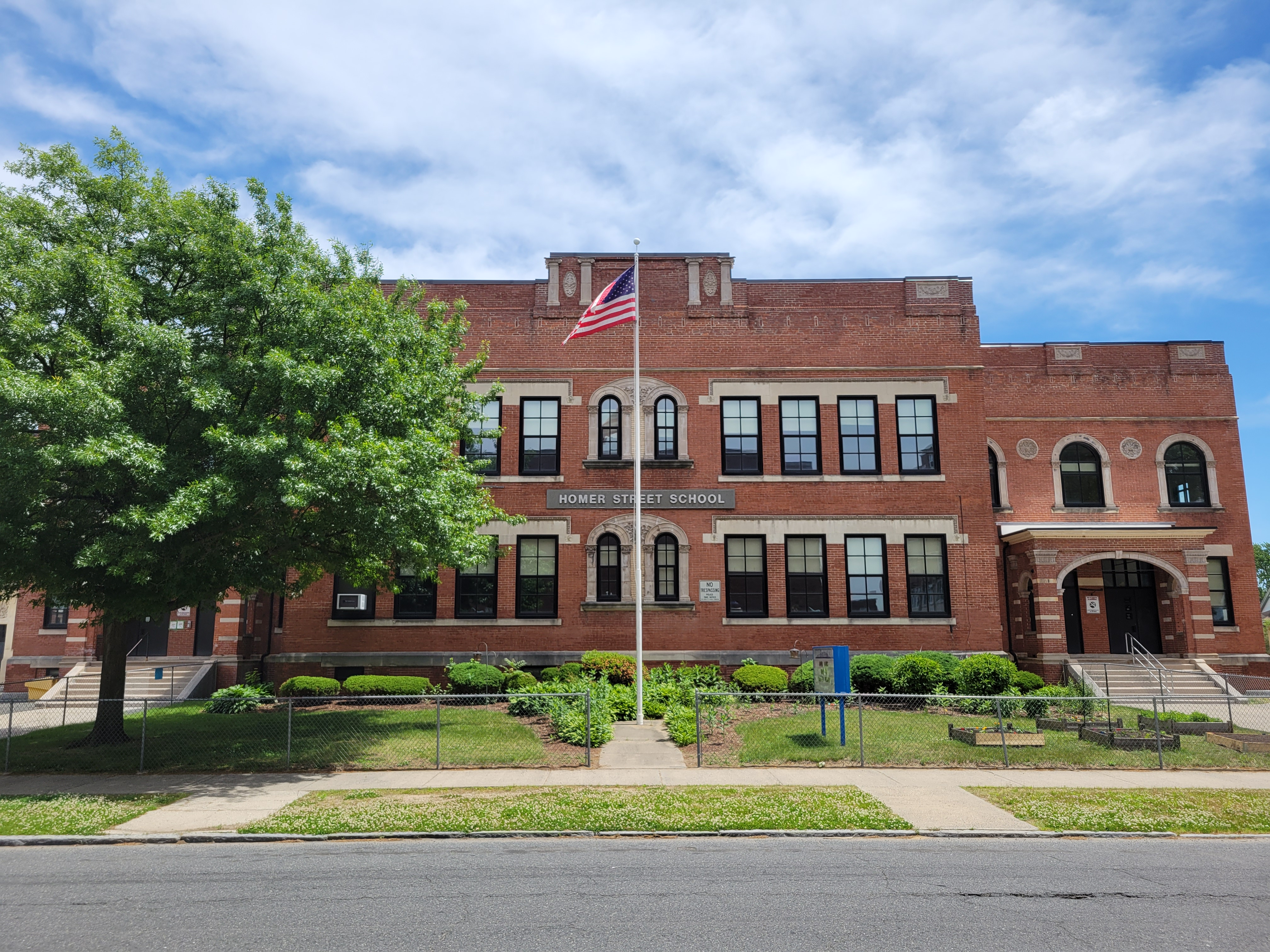
- Springfield College, birthplace of basketball Indian Motorcycle factory Homer Street School

- Location within Massachusetts Location within the United States
- Coordinates: 42.1098164°N 72.5536989°W
- Country: United States
- State: Massachusetts
- County: Hampden
- Elevation: 197 ft (60 m)
- Time zone: UTC−5 (Eastern)
  - Summer (DST): UTC−4 (Eastern)
- GNIS feature ID: 609100

Upper Hill is a neighborhood in the city of Springfield, Massachusetts, United States.

Watershops Pond borders the south of Upper Hill.

== History ==
A branch of the New York, New Haven and Hartford Railroad—the "Highland Division"—was constructed along the western boundary of Upper Hill in the 1800s, fostering industrial development along its route. Hendee Manufacturing Company (later Indian Motorcycle) established a factory here, where it remained until 1953. The factory has since been converted to apartments. Knox Automobile Company also established a factory in Upper Hill, one of several automobile manufacturers in Springfield. The rail line was abandoned in 1993. Upper Hill had been "sparsely settled" until the factories arrived, and by the 1910s, new streets and house lots had been planned. Neighborhood residential development accounts for approximately 90 percent of the zoned land in Upper Hill.

Two colleges are located in Upper Hill, American International College and Springfield College, where basketball was invented in 1891.

== Arts and culture ==
Winchester Square Historic District in Upper Hill is listed on the National Register of Historic Places.
