= Watershops Pond =

Coordinates: 42°6′15.2″N 72°32′59.6″W

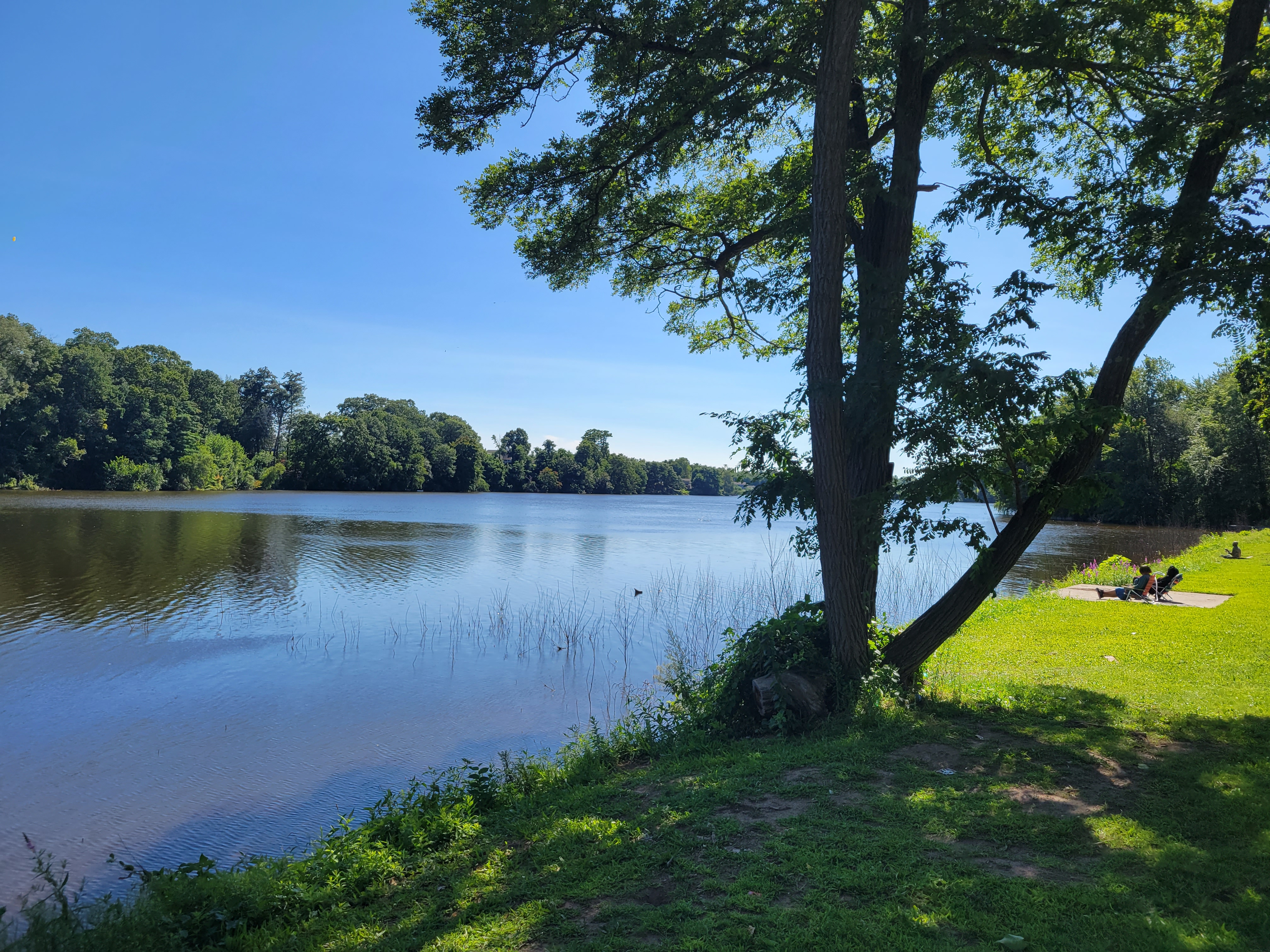
Watershops Pond

Watershops Pond (or Lake Massasoit) is a lake in the city of Springfield, Massachusetts. Located in the Upper Hill neighborhood, it is the city's second-largest body of water, after the Connecticut River. Watershops Pond features 7 miles of shorelines and 186 acres. It was a major site for fishing, featuring species ranging from Black Crappie, Bluegill, Brown Trout, Chain Pickerel, Channel Catfish, Common Carp, Largemouth Bass, Pumpkinseed, Rainbow Trout, and Yellow Bass. The city after multiple lowering of the dam draining the pins for lengthy periods had destroyed the habitat. Not only had it decimated the fish population, leaving primarily pumpkinseed, calico bass, and carp, it also lost aquatic mammals such as the muskrat. The pond was formed by damming the Mill River, which flows out of the westernmost end and continues 1.25 miles until its confluence with the Connecticut River.

In the 19th century, three separate facilities: the Upper, Middle, and Lower Watershops on Watershops Pond, were built by the Springfield Armory along a dammed stream to house heavy equipment such as trip hammers, forges, and barrel rolling machinery. Eventually, these three units were combined into one facility, known as the Water Shops, which remained in service until the Springfield Armory was controversially shut down by The Pentagon in 1968. The Watershops gave name to the lake, which had initially been called Lake Massasoit. The original Watershops building still stands on Allen Street in Springfield.

Springfield College, the institution where basketball was founded in 1891, borders Watershops Pond.
