= Forest Park, Springfield, Massachusetts =

Historic district in Massachusetts, US

- Forest Park Heights Historic District
- U.S. National Register of Historic Places
- U.S. Historic district
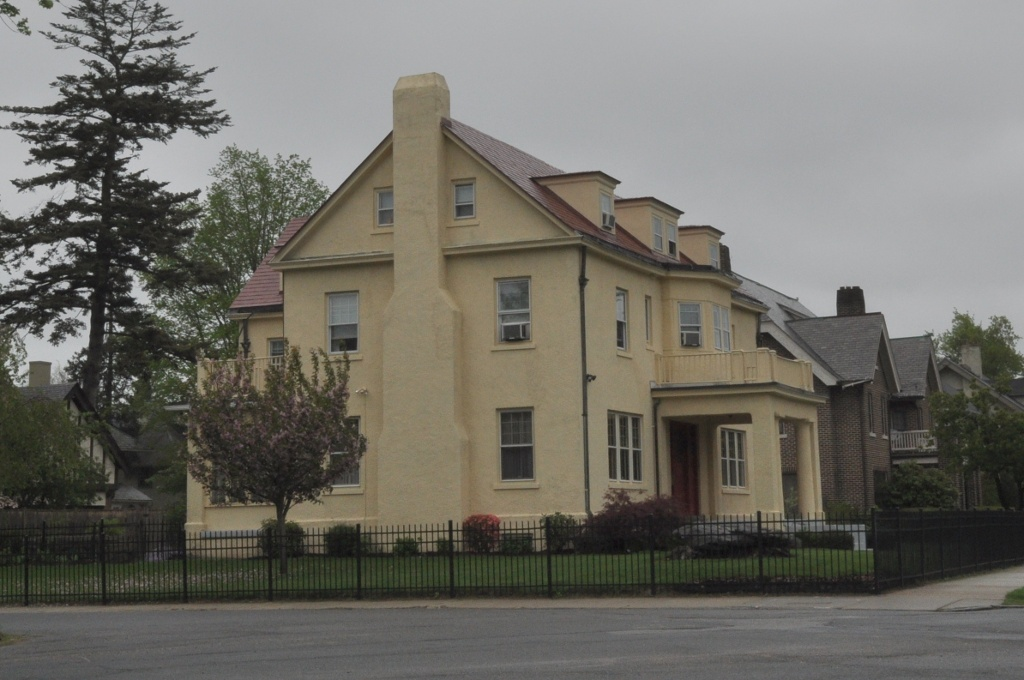

- Location within Massachusetts Location within the United States
- Interactive map showing the location of Forest Park Heights Historic District
- Location: Springfield, Massachusetts
- Coordinates: 42°5′4″N 72°34′19″W
- Built: 1893
- Architect: Mutual Investment Co.; Forest Park Heights Co.
- Architectural style: Late-19th and 20th Century Revivals, Late Victorian
- NRHP reference No.: 82004942
- Added to NRHP: August 31, 1982

Forest Park is a Victorian garden district located in Springfield, Massachusetts, developed between 1880 and 1920. It is the city's most populous neighborhood and surrounds the 735-acre Forest Park, for which the neighborhood is named. The Forest Park neighborhood has nature and recreation within walking distance. To the west, I-91 separates Forest Park from the Connecticut River. A 195-acre section of the neighborhood was listed on the National Register of Historic Places in 1982 as the Forest Park Heights Historic District.

The 600-house Forest Park Heights Historic District was developed between 1890 and 1910 and includes gracious Colonial Revival, Tudor Revival, Queen Anne, and shingle style homes. This neighborhood was named one of the Northeast's "Best Old House Neighborhoods" by This Old House in 2010. East of the park is the Trafton Road area with Colonials and Tudors dating from the 1920s. Further east in this tree-filled neighborhood are pockets of American Craftsman-style houses and more Colonials.

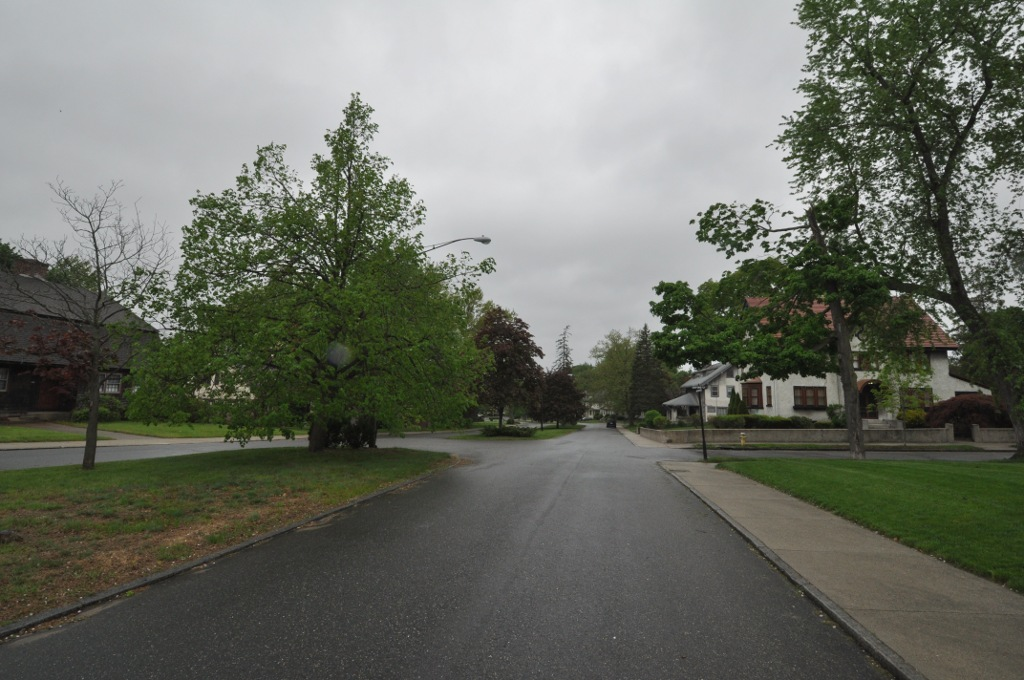
Riverview Terrace

Within the park for which the neighborhood is named are a zoo, walking and hiking trails, promenades, playgrounds, lakes and ponds, a formal rose garden, the Barney Carriage House, sculptures, baseball diamonds, basketball courts, tennis courts, bocce courts, lawn bowling fields, and a hockey arena, Cyr Arena. During the winter holiday season, the park features a lighting display, Bright Nights, a 2.6-mile trail of large, intricate, animated lighting displays. The 18-hole Franconia Municipal Golf Course is also in the neighborhood.

Georgetown, on the Longmeadow town line, is the neighborhood's largest condominium complex, and there are smaller condo complexes in the area.

Forest Park also contains a branch library, the Jewish Community Center, and a commercial district known as the "X," at the intersection of Sumner Avenue, Belmont Avenue, and Dickinson Street.

== See also ==
- National Register of Historic Places listings in Springfield, Massachusetts
- National Register of Historic Places listings in Hampden County, Massachusetts
