= Baystate Health =

Not-for-profit integrated health system

- Company type: Not-for-profit corporation
- Industry: Health care
- Genre: Health care system
- Founded: 1970; 56 years ago (Originally Springfield City Hospital)
- Headquarters: Springfield, Massachusetts, United States
- Area served: Western Massachusetts; Connecticut
- Number of employees: 12,000
- Website: baystatehealth.org

Baystate Health is a non-profit integrated healthcare system headquartered in Springfield, Massachusetts, primarily serving Western Massachusetts. The system comprises four acute-care hospitals encompassing over 1,000 licensed beds; a multi-specialty group, Baystate Medical Practices, which includes over 700 physicians across 40 care locations; and a health maintenance organization (HMO), Health New England, which covers residents of parts of Massachusetts, Connecticut, New York, Vermont, and New Hampshire. The system's flagship hospital, Baystate Medical Center, serves as the only Level I trauma center in Western Massachusetts.

In 2022, Baystate's four hospitals reported a total of over 55,000 discharges and over 185,000 emergency department visits. A fifth, the former Baystate Mary Lane Hospital in Ware, was demolished in August 2025, two years after its closure.

In 2026 Baystate entered into a definitive agreement (pending regulatory approval) to integrate Mercy Medical Center as Baystate Mercy Hospital into the Baystate hierarchy, along with several other Mercy locations.. Once completed, this would bring the number of hospitals back up to 5.

== History ==
=== 1974–1983 ===
In 1974, Springfield Hospital Medical Center merged Wesson Women's Hospital to create the 672-bed Medical Center of Western Massachusetts. In 1976, the Medical Center of Western Massachusetts merged with Wesson Memorial Hospital. The merger established Baystate Medical Center, then the second-largest hospital in New England, with 1,036 beds.

In 1983, Baystate Medical Center was reorganized into three separate corporations: Baystate Health Systems, the parent corporation now renamed Baystate Health; Baystate Medical Center; and the for-profit corporation Baystate Diversified Health Services. The reorganization provided a legal framework for developing a future multi-institutional health care system and for reducing the assets that would be encumbered with the financing of a major new hospital building.

=== 1986–2004 ===
In 1986, Franklin Medical Center in Greenfield joined Baystate Health; in 1999, Baystate Mary Lane Hospital in Ware joined the health system. In 2004, the Visiting Nurse Association & Hospice of Pioneer Valley, now renamed the Baystate Visiting Nurse Association & Hospice, became a member of Baystate Health.

To this end, a major corporate restructuring in 1997 reduced the number of governing boards across BH from twenty-one to six. On January 1, 2004, the governance structure of Baystate Health was further simplified with the establishment of a single board of trustees for Baystate Health that also serves as mirror boards for its patient care entities that had previously been governed by a separate board.

=== 2005–present ===
In August 2016, a phishing scam of Baystate Health employees may have compromised some demographic and clinical information of as many as 13,000 patients. Baystate informed patients and stated social security numbers or financial or account information was not accessed in the scam.

in 2026, the process to integrate Baystate Mercy Hospital begins.

== Components ==
=== Baystate Children's Hospital ===
Located on the campus of Baystate Medical Center in Springfield, Massachusetts, Baystate Children's Hospital, with 110 beds and 57 bassinets, provides complete critical care programs, including the region's only Pediatric Intensive Care and Neonatal Intensive Care Units. It also includes pediatric inpatient services, child life specialists, an emergency room for kids, and outpatient specialty services.

=== Baystate Franklin Medical Center ===
Baystate Franklin Medical Center is a hospital in Greenfield, Massachusetts.

==== History of Baystate Franklin Medical Center ====
In 1894, Dr. William Pierce and Ellen Brown rented a house at 6 Main Street and opened a private medical practice. The following year, citizens of Franklin County agreed to open Franklin County Public Hospital (FCPH). With $16,000 in community fundraising, the new hospital opened on September 9, 1895. In 1910, the hospital had raised an additional $65,000 in donations, enough to build a much larger facility on High Street. Although FCPH struggled financially during the Great Depression, it managed to expand its facilities and recruit new medical specialists. The hospital expanded further after World War II, and became affiliated with Baystate Medical Center in 1981. To reflect this new affiliation, it was renamed Baystate Franklin Medical Center (BMFC) two years later.

As of July 2025, Baystate Franklin Medical Center is one of several rural hospitals in New England listed as at risk of closure due to recent federal budget cuts made under the Trump Administration.

==== Current facilities and operations of Baystate Franklin Medical Center ====
Baystate Franklin Medical Center is a 90-bed hospital providing medical, surgical, obstetric, pediatric, psychiatric and behavioral health inpatient care, as well as outpatient services. With 900 employees, it is the only hospital in Franklin County and serves rural communities with appropriate specialized services.

=== Baystate Mary Lane Hospital ===
Shuttered by Baystate Health in 2023 after 99 years of operation, the Baystate Mary Lane Hospital was a non-profit community hospital in Ware that until its final years of operation had provided medical, surgical, pediatric, obstetric, emergency, outpatient, and adult day care services to the residents of the surrounding area. Founded in 1909 as the Mary Lane Hospital by the Ware Visiting Nurse Association after being awarded an endowment by the estate of Lewis Gilbert, a patriarch of an affluent local family who had set aside the equivalent of $10 million in his will to be used for the construction and operation a permanent hospital in Ware, with the condition it would "be forever known as ‘The Mary Lane Hospital'", in honor of his late wife.

Baystate Health acquired Mary Lane Hospital in 1991 along with the remainder of the Gilbert endowment, which still contained over $6 million as recently as 2020, although Baystate did not change the name to "Baystate Mary Lane Hospital" until 2006".

In 2016, overnight care at Mary Lane was terminated, and on June 3, 2021, in the midst of the COVID-19 pandemic Baystate Health made the decision to permanently close the hospital's emergency department, after which it was briefly renamed Baystate Mary Lane Outpatient Clinic, reflecting the significant downgrading of the institution's capacities from 2016 until its complete closure seven years later. The Mary Lane Hospital had served communities in Western and Central Massachusetts that were similarly distant from both of the regional's primary medical hubs in Worcester and Springfield, for almost a century, communities which like those formerly treated at Monson Developmental Center, are now required to travel to Baystate Wing Hospital in Palmer or further to receive healthcare formerly provided at Mary Lane.

In August 2025, in spite of local protests, Baystate Health demolished all but one of the historic buildings on the former Baystate Mary Lane Hospital campus.

=== Baystate Medical ===
Baystate Medical Center (BMC) is a hospital in Springfield, Massachusetts.

==== History of Baystate Medical Center ====
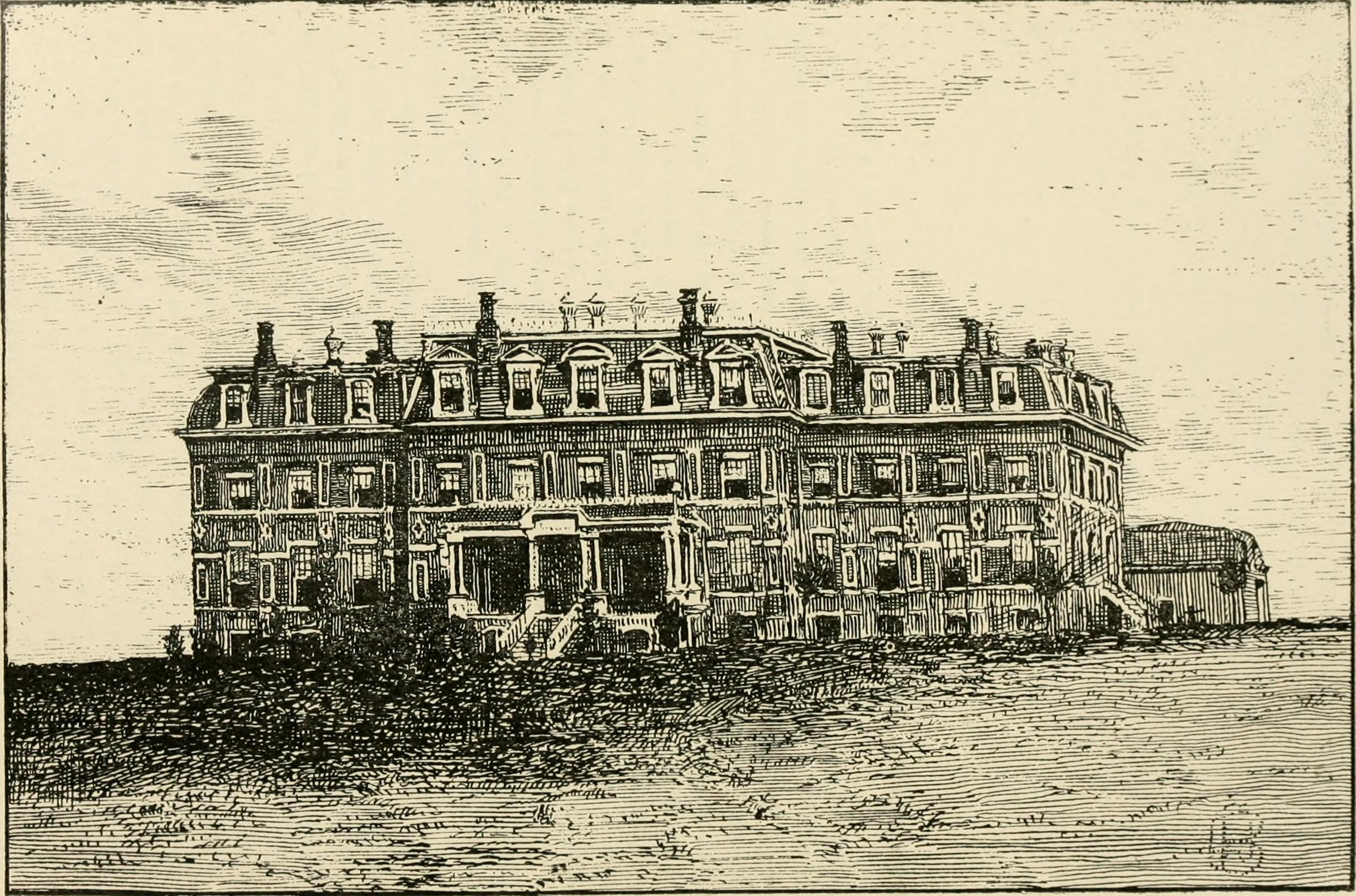
King's handbook of Springfield, Massachusetts - a series of monographs, historical and descriptive (1884) (14804598813)

In 1868, Dr. George Stebbins, the city physician in Springfield, Massachusetts, recommended that the city establish a permanent hospital. The need for a dedicated hospital in Springfield became evident during and after the Civil War, when wounded soldiers came to the city in search of treatment. The city approved Dr. Stebbins' recommendation, and Springfield City Hospital opened two years later in a remodeled farmhouse on Boston Road. In 1886, Dorcas Chapin, the widow of Chester W. Chapin, bequeathed $25,000 of her husband's will to Springfield Hospital on the condition that an equal sum be raised. By 1907, the hospital had a main building surrounding by four wings.

In the twentieth century, Springfield's population increased considerably, and Springfield Hospital further expanded Expansion culminated in a big merger in fall 1976, when Springfield Hospital and Wesson Women's Hospital joined with Wesson Memorial to form the 1,036-bed Baystate Medical Center (BMC). Today, BMC is the largest hospital affiliated with Baystate Health Systems.

In 2012, Baystate Medical Center opened a new 641,000-square-foot (59,600 m^{2}), $300 million facility that includes: a heart and vascular center; new patient care units with private rooms; a new emergency department, of 70,000 square feet (6,500 m^{2}). The new building also includes shell space for future growth. It was officially dedicated on February 28, 2012. The Massachusetts Department of Health certified the new building in January 2012 and new patients began to occupy the building in March 2012.

==== Current facilities and operations of Baystate Medical Center ====
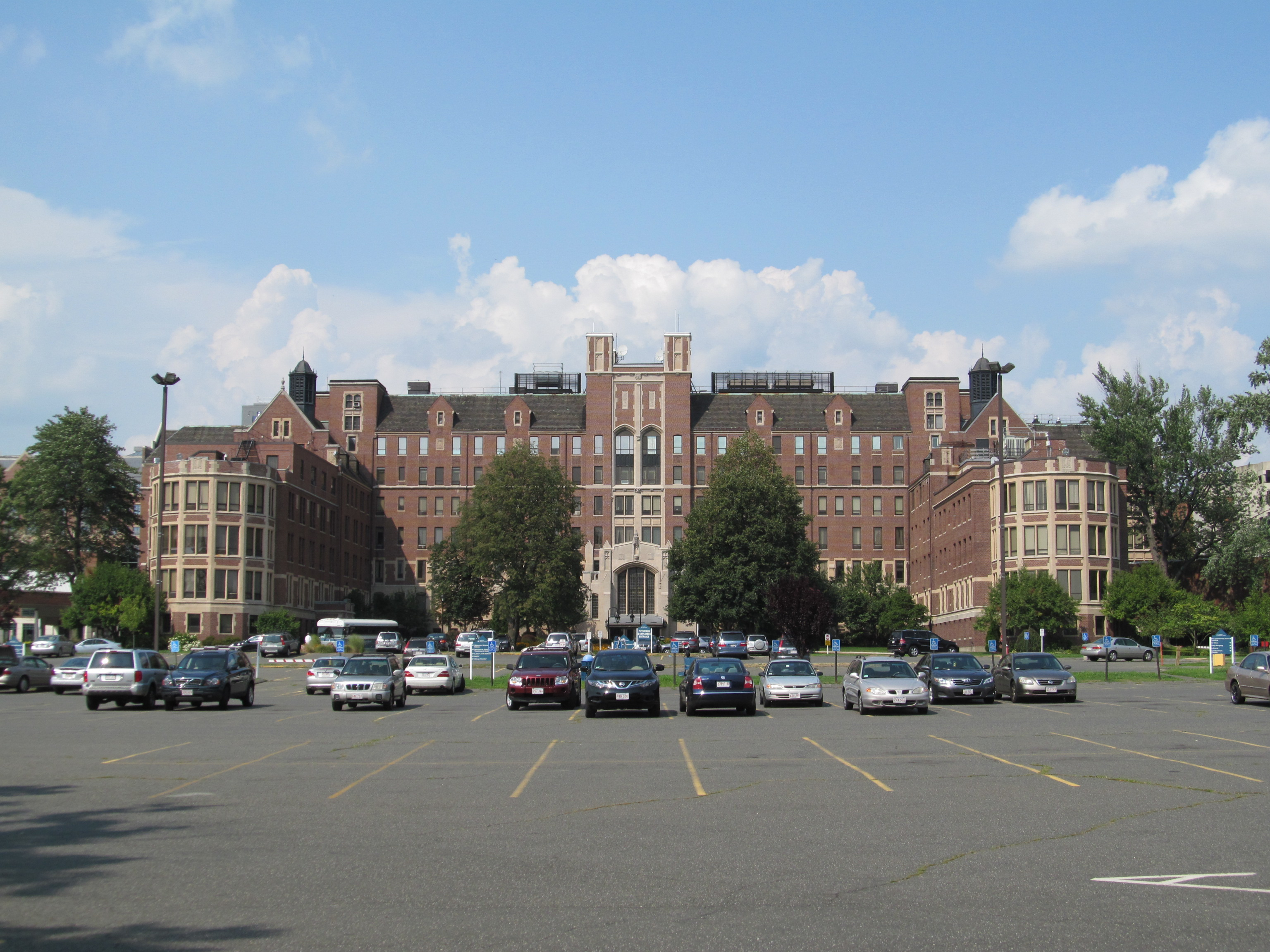
Baystate Medical Center, Springfield MA

Baystate Medical Center is currently a tax-exempt, nonprofit hospital with 716 beds and more than 4,000 employees. BMC serves as the tertiary care referral center for the region, meaning that it has a full complement of medical services and facilities. The latter include the area's only neonatal intensive care unit, a level-1 trauma center with pediatric designation, an adult cardiac surgery service with the region's only open-heart surgery capabilities, and a kidney transplant center. BMC is affiliated with the University of Massachusetts Medical School, and therefore is classified as an academic hospital. In 2016, U.S. News & World Report ranked BMC the third-best hospital in Massachusetts. In March 2020, BMC constructed a triage area outside the emergency department to address the potential surge in COVID-19 patients.

=== Baystate Noble Hospital ===
Baystate Noble Hospital is a medical center in Westfield, Massachusetts.

==== History of Baystate Noble Hospital ====
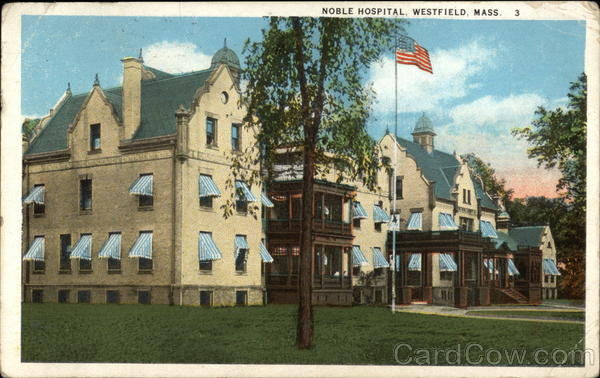
Noble Hospital Westfield, MA in the early 1900s

Founded in 1893, Noble Hospital owes its existence to Reuben Noble. Noble was born in Westfield in 1820. He made a fortune from the city's whip manufacturing industry and unsuccessfully campaigned as a Democrat in two Massachusetts State Senate elections. Noble died on June 3, 1890. His will gifted over $43,000 for the establishment of a hospital "for the reception of persons who may need medical or surgical treatment during temporary sickness or injury." Noble Hospital addressed the demand for a dedicated medical facility in Westfield, which was industrializing rapidly at the turn of the century.

By 1905, Noble Hospital had expanded to include a surgical center and a nurse's training school. Between 1917 and 1920, the hospital's medical staff treated hundreds of wounded World War I veterans and Spanish Influenza patients. It grew further in the interwar period and treated airmen from Westfield's Barnes Airport during World War II. In 1956, its trustees voted to construct a new hospital building. Westfield residents enthusiastically supported this decision, raising $1,500,000 to fund the construction of this new facility. The new Noble Hospital opened in 1958, and has expanded its services substantially over the past half century.

==== Current facilities and operations of Baystate Noble Hospital ====
In 2015, Noble Hospital joined Baystate Health and became Baystate Noble Hospital. The 97-bed facility now has an emergency center, a psychiatric ward, and an ICU. Services include intensive care, diagnostic imaging, cardiopulmonary services and rehab, emergency treatment, cancer services, lab and behavioral health. In 2015, the Cleverley & Associates Community Value Index recognized Noble Hospital as being in the top 20 percent of hospitals nationwide. In 2019 both the Telemetry Unit and the Intensive Care Unit of Noble Hospital were closed. Currently the mental health unit is scheduled to close in 2023.

=== Baystate Wing Hospital ===
Baystate Wing Hospital in Palmer, Massachusetts is a 74-bed community hospital with a history of providing health care for the Quaboag Hills and the Pioneer Valley. In addition, Baystate Wing's five medical centers, located in Belchertown, Palmer, and Wilbraham, offer outpatient services and primary care.

=== Baystate Mercy Hospital ===
Mercy Medical Center, is a 300-bed hospital in Springfield, Massachusetts, less than a mile from Baystate Medical Center.

==== History of Baystate Mercy Hospital ====
Founded by the Sisters of Providence on November 7, 1873 as a smaller facility in Holyoke, evolving into Mercy Medical Center.
