= Bill Karlon =

American baseball player (1909-1964)

- Born: January 21, 1909; Palmer, Massachusetts, U.S.
- Died: December 7, 1964 (aged 55); Ware, Massachusetts, U.S.
- Batted: Right Threw: Right

MLB debut
- April 28, 1930, for the New York Yankees

Last MLB appearance
- April 28, 1930, for the New York Yankees

MLB statistics
- Games played: 2
- At bats: 5
- Hits: 0
- Stats at Baseball Reference

Teams
- New York Yankees (1930)

William John Karlon (January 21, 1909 – December 7, 1964) was an American Major League Baseball outfielder. Nicknamed "Hank", Karlon played for the New York Yankees in 1930. In 2 career games, he had no hits in 5 at-bats. He batted and threw right-handed.

The Yankees claimed Karlon from the Springfield Ponies of the second iteration of the Eastern League in March 1930. Karlon had joined the Ponies after graduating from Palmer High School in Palmer, Massachusetts. The Yankees thought the bow-legged outfielder was a future star like Jimmie Foxx. Ed Barrow had a scout follow Karlon around the Eastern League and claimed him on waivers for $4,000, a low value as no other teams put in bids for the outfielder's services. On April 14, 1930, the Yankees announced that they would eventually option Karlon out to the Jersey City Skeeters of the International League along with Bill Henderson, Ed Walsh and Floyd Van Pelt.

However, by April 25, there were questions of Karlon's future on the team. The Yankees had made a deal with the Ponies to send Karlon back to Springfield if he did not meet the moment for the team, who were struggling by that point of the season. Karlon was optioned on May 16 back to the Ponies.

Karlon died of a heart attack while hunting in Ware, Massachusetts on December 7, 1964. His funeral was held on December 10 in Three Rivers, Massachusetts.
