= Todd Smola =

American politician

Todd M. Smola
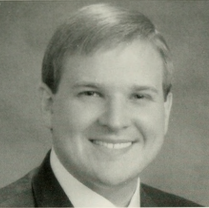
- Smola in 2005

Member of the Massachusetts House of Representatives from the First Hampden district
- Incumbent
- Assumed office January 5, 2005
- Preceded by: Reed V. Hillman

Personal details
- Born: 1977 (age 48–49)
- Party: Republican
- Education: Westfield State University

Todd M. Smola (born c. 1977) is a Republican member of the Massachusetts House of Representatives Smola represents the 1st Hampden District, serving the towns of Brimfield, Holland, Palmer, Sturbridge, Wales, Ware, and Warren.

== Education ==
Smola graduated from Palmer High School in 1995. He earned an associate degree in liberal arts from Holyoke Community College and a Bachelor of Science in geography and regional planning from Westfield State College.

== Political career ==
=== City of Palmer ===
Smola began his career in politics in 1997 at the age of 20, when he became the youngest elected member of the Palmer planning board in the city's history. Three years later, he became the youngest elected member on the Board of Selectmen; he served both offices simultaneously. While serving in Palmer, he served as chairman of the Board of Selectmen (2002–2003 and in 2004); the Pioneer Valley Planning Commissioner; and the education liaison to the Palmer Public Schools (for 2 years). As the chairman of the Board of Selectmen, Smola oversaw a local government transition that replaced the 3-member Board of Selectmen and Open Town Meeting with a Town Manager and a 9-member Town Council, first elected in November 2004.

Additionally, Smola has served on the Palmer Senior Center Building Committee and the local Emergency Planning Committee.

=== Massachusetts House of Representatives ===
In 2001, Smola served as a legislative aide to State Representative Reed V. Hillman. Smola served in that capacity until August 2004, when he ran to replace Hillman in the legislature after his retirement.

In the 2008-2009 Legislative Session, Smola served as the ranking member of the Joint Committee on Public Service and the Joint Committee on Telecommunications, Utilities and Energy. He has also been a member of the Joint Committee on Veterans and Federal Affairs, the Joint Committee on Municipalities Regional Government, the Joint Committee on Veteran's and Federal Affairs and the Joint Committee on Tourism, Arts and Cultural Development. Currently, Smola serves on the Joint Committee on Public Service and is the ranking member of the House Committee on Bonding, Capital Expenditures and State Assets.

=== Additional affiliations ===
Smola is currently a member of the Sons of AMVETS, the Parish of Divine Mercy Council, the St. Stanislaus Polish Lyceum, and the St. Joseph's Society.

== See also ==
- 2019–2020 Massachusetts legislature
- 2021–2022 Massachusetts legislature
