= Hampden County, Massachusetts =

County in Massachusetts, United States

- County
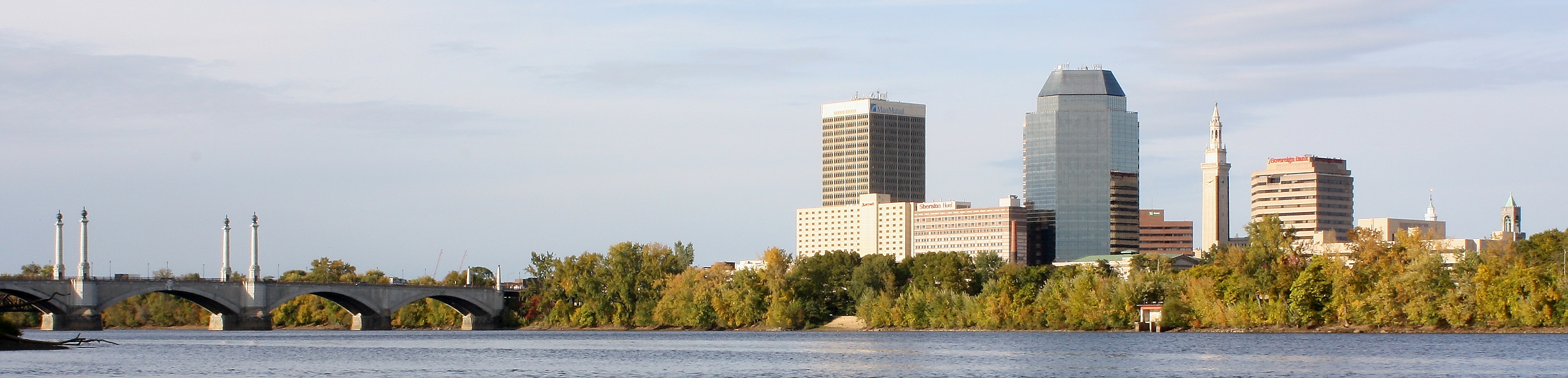
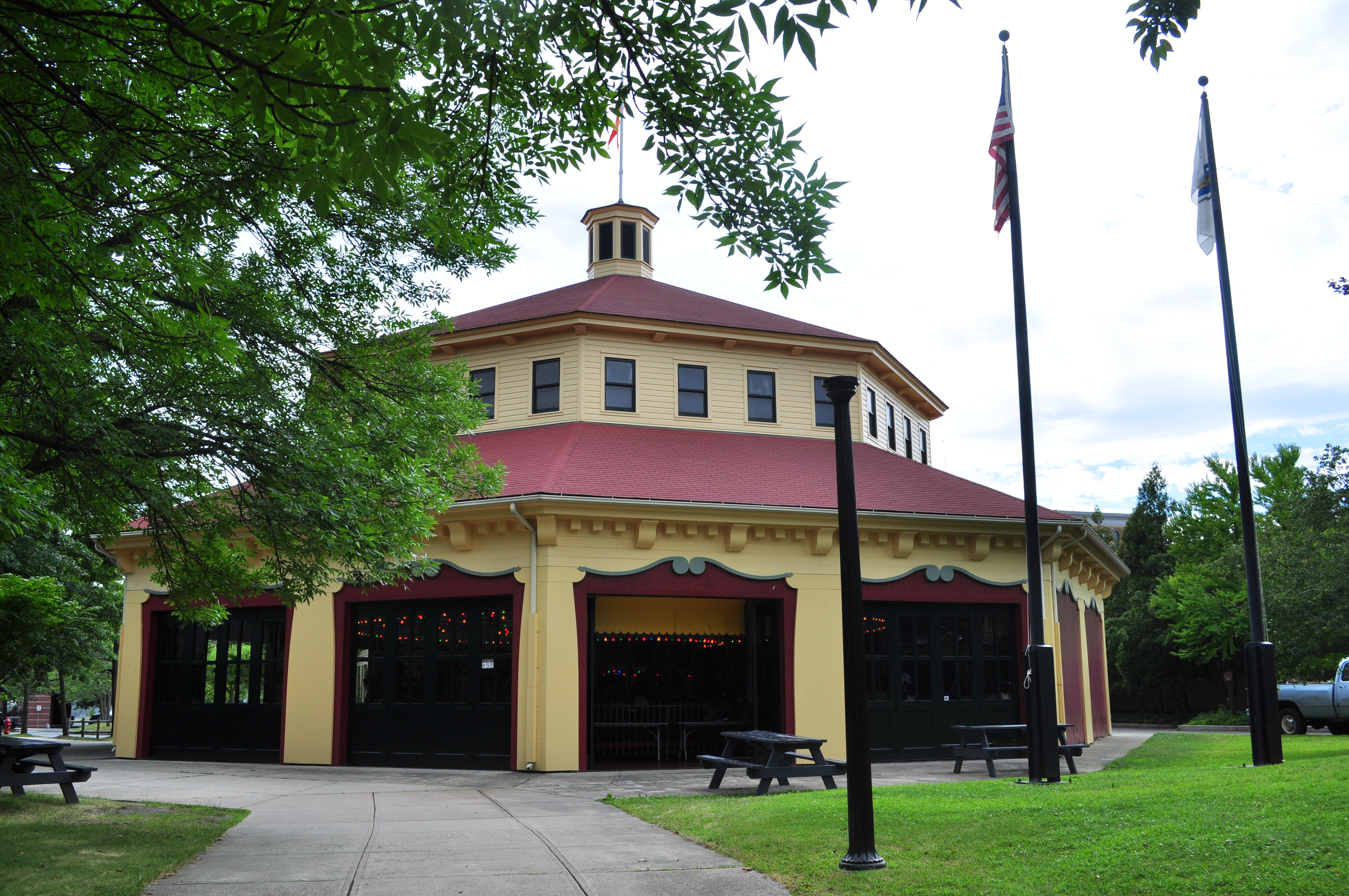
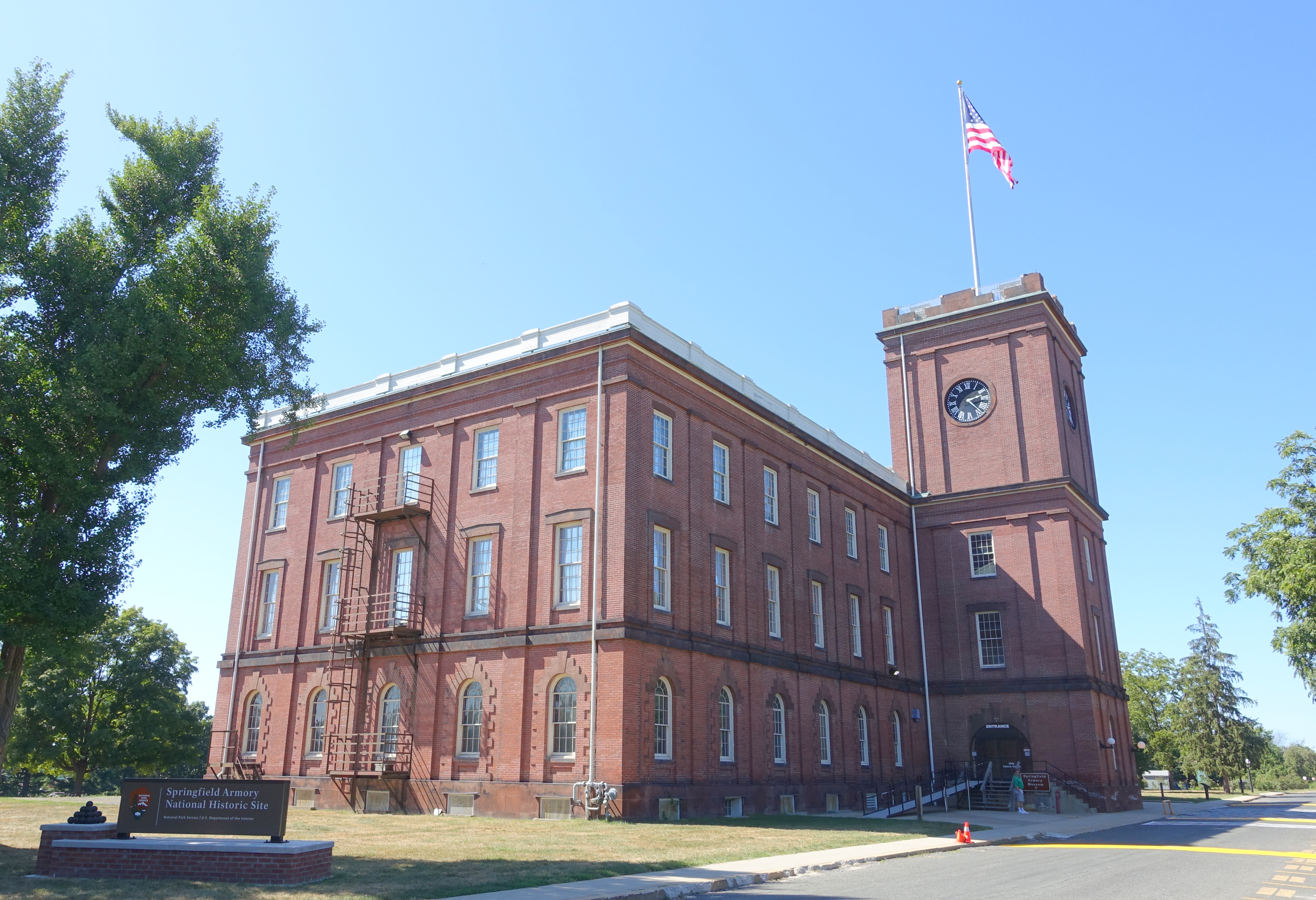
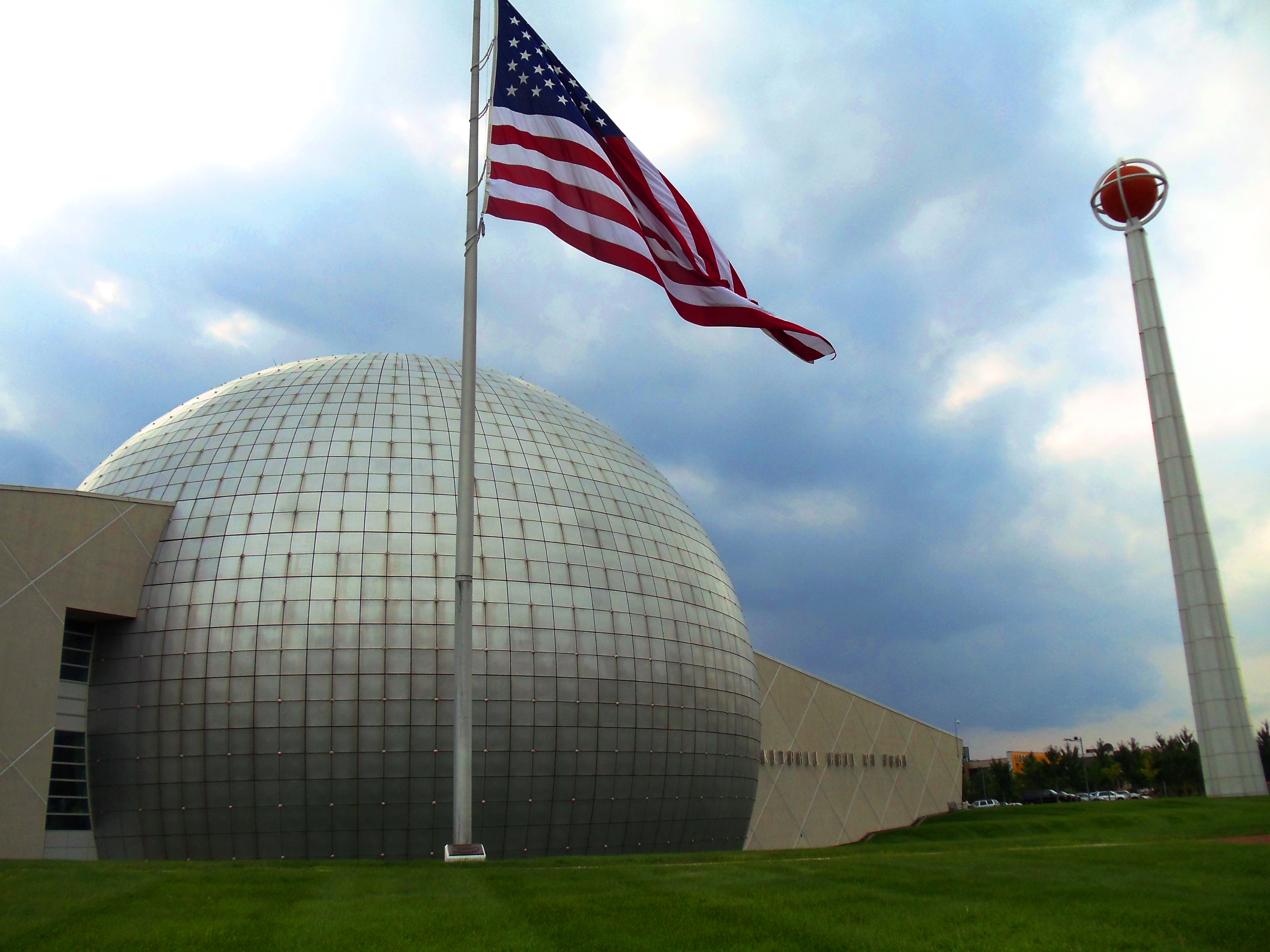
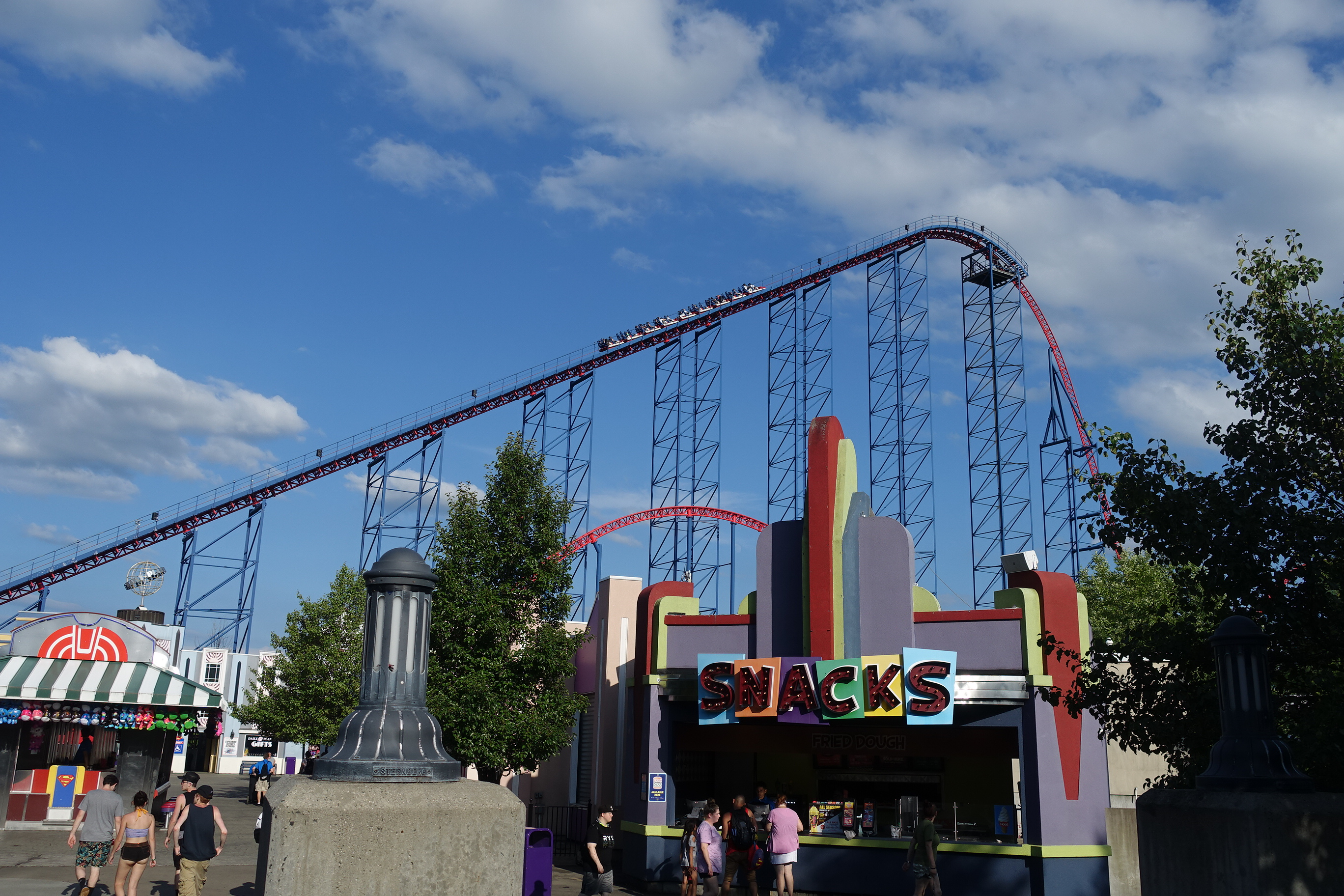
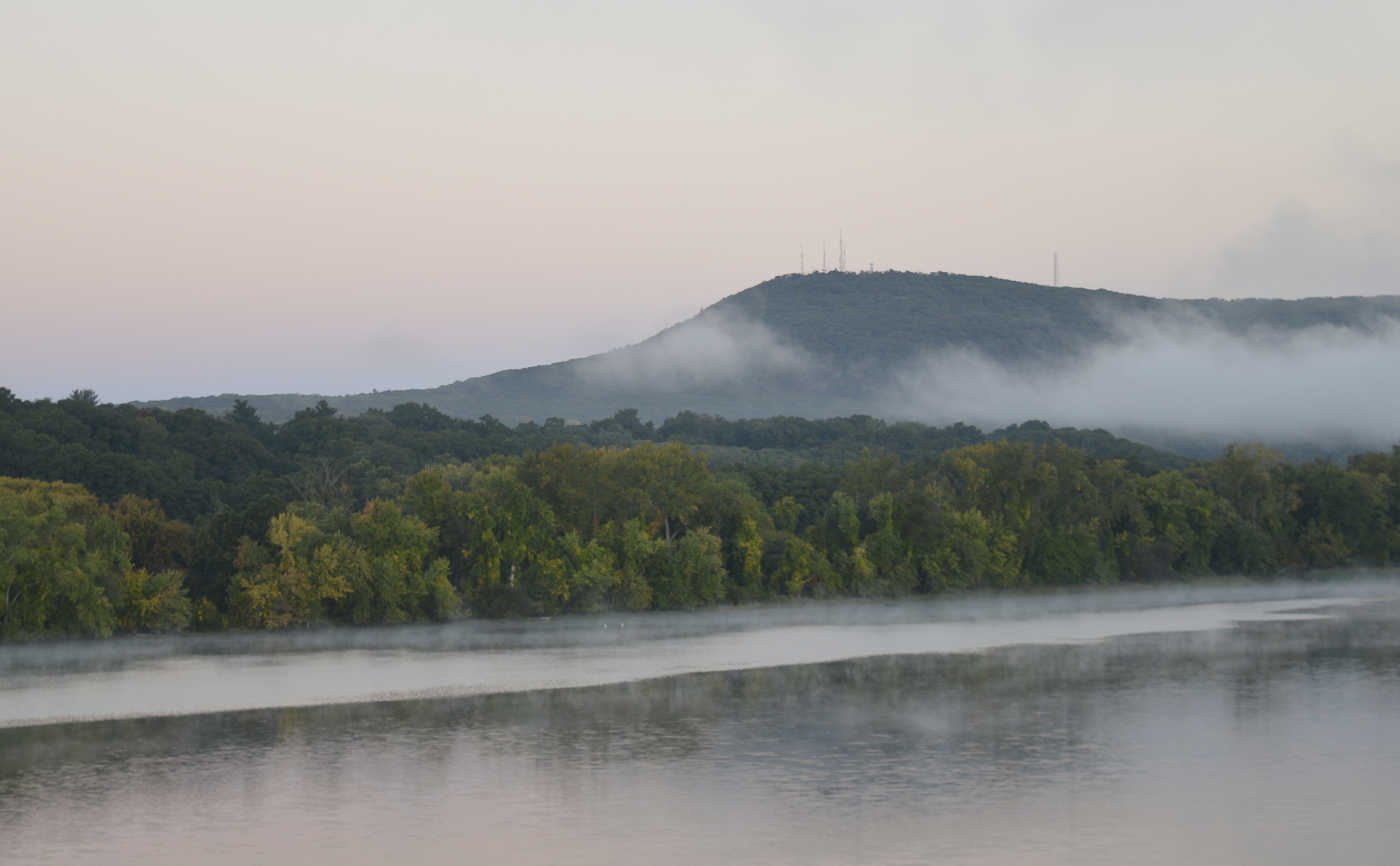
- Springfield Holyoke Merry-Go-Round Springfield Armory Basketball Hall of Fame Six Flags New England Mount Tom

- Seal

- Location within the U.S. state of Massachusetts
- Coordinates: 42°07′39″N 72°34′17″W
- Country: United States
- State: Massachusetts
- Founded: August 1, 1812
- Named for: John Hampden
- Seat: Springfield
- Largest city: Springfield

Area
  - Total: 634 sq mi (1,640 km^{2})
  - Land: 617 sq mi (1,600 km^{2})
  - Water: 17 sq mi (44 km^{2}) 2.7%

Population (2020)
  - Total: 465,825
  - Estimate (2024): 464,338 ▼
  - Density: 755/sq mi (292/km^{2})
- Time zone: UTC−5 (Eastern)
  - Summer (DST): UTC−4 (EDT)
- Congressional districts: 1st, 2nd

Hampden County is a non-governmental county located in the Pioneer Valley of the U.S. state of Massachusetts, in the United States. As of the 2020 census, Hampden County's population was 465,825. Its traditional county seat is Springfield, the Connecticut River Valley's largest city, and economic and cultural capital; with an estimated population of 154,758, approximately one-third of Hampden County residents live in Springfield.

== History ==
Springfield had been Hampshire County's traditional shire town since its founding in 1636, then in 1794 Northampton was made Hampshire County's shire town. Springfield grew at a pace far quicker than Northampton, so was granted shire town-status over its own southerly jurisdiction. The southern division of Hampshire County was separated as Hampden County on August 1, 1812, by a prior act of the Massachusetts General Court on February 25, 1812, with Springfield named as the shire town. The agreement of settlement (regarding assets, liabilities, income and expenses) made between Hampden and Hampshire counties in November 1812 can be found in the Court of Sessions Record Book 1, pages 5–6 of the Hampden County Commissioners' Archives, housed in the Registry of Deeds. Hampden County was named for parliamentarian John Hampden, and is the youngest county by establishment date in the state.

To the north of Hampden County is modern-day Hampshire County; to the west is Berkshire County; to the east is Worcester County; to the south are Litchfield County, Hartford County, and Tolland County in Connecticut. Hampden County is part of the Springfield Metropolitan Statistical Area. It is the most urban county in Western Massachusetts. The Knowledge Corridor surrounding Springfield-Hartford is New England's second most populous urban area (after Greater Boston) with 1.9 million people.

== Law and government ==
As with most Massachusetts counties, Hampden County exists today only as a historical geographic region, and has no county government. All former county functions were assumed by state agencies in 1998. The sheriff and some other regional officials with specific duties are still elected locally to perform duties within the county borders, but there is no county council, county commission or other county governing body. Communities are now granted the right to form their own regional compacts for sharing services. Hampden County and Hampshire County together are part of the Pioneer Valley Planning Commission.

== Government and politics ==
United States presidential election results for Hampden County, Massachusetts
Year	Republican / Whig		Democratic		Third party(ies)	
Year	No.	%	No.	%	No.	%
1836	2,262	48.83%	2,370	51.17%	0	0.00%
1840	3,441	50.09%	3,312	48.21%	117	1.70%
1844	3,416	45.79%	3,593	48.16%	451	6.05%
1848	3,306	43.21%	3,061	40.01%	1,284	16.78%
1852	3,458	44.50%	3,545	45.62%	767	9.87%
1856	5,533	62.21%	2,730	30.69%	631	7.09%
1860	5,184	64.28%	1,993	24.71%	888	11.01%
1864	6,356	68.71%	2,894	31.29%	0	0.00%
1868	6,760	64.61%	3,702	35.39%	0	0.00%
1872	6,565	61.56%	4,100	38.44%	0	0.00%
1876	7,963	54.49%	6,605	45.20%	46	0.31%
1880	8,673	57.68%	6,194	41.19%	170	1.13%
1884	7,897	47.76%	7,245	43.81%	1,394	8.43%
1888	9,577	49.71%	9,177	47.64%	511	2.65%
1892	11,373	48.82%	11,228	48.20%	693	2.98%
1896	16,064	67.65%	6,787	28.58%	893	3.76%
1900	13,757	54.66%	10,424	41.41%	989	3.93%
1904	14,962	57.61%	9,369	36.07%	1,641	6.32%
1908	14,485	52.19%	9,910	35.71%	3,358	12.10%
1912	11,393	37.45%	10,620	34.91%	8,410	27.64%
1916	18,207	50.19%	17,028	46.94%	1,042	2.87%
1920	46,741	68.92%	19,156	28.25%	1,923	2.84%
1924	46,489	59.97%	19,079	24.61%	11,947	15.41%
1928	56,063	47.18%	62,056	52.23%	703	0.59%
1932	55,032	44.51%	63,189	51.11%	5,408	4.37%
1936	51,288	36.59%	80,164	57.19%	8,728	6.23%
1940	64,502	41.67%	89,477	57.80%	817	0.53%
1944	63,293	40.71%	91,819	59.05%	374	0.24%
1948	70,256	41.89%	94,609	56.41%	2,855	1.70%
1952	98,641	51.86%	90,936	47.81%	616	0.32%
1956	104,689	55.87%	81,743	43.63%	935	0.50%
1960	72,054	37.17%	121,061	62.46%	713	0.37%
1964	44,299	24.86%	133,085	74.67%	835	0.47%
1968	55,783	31.31%	111,376	62.52%	10,991	6.17%
1972	86,164	47.31%	94,945	52.13%	1,024	0.56%
1976	70,008	37.78%	110,028	59.38%	5,254	2.84%
1980	72,528	40.36%	80,369	44.72%	26,823	14.92%
1984	89,330	51.05%	84,985	48.57%	656	0.37%
1988	74,872	43.17%	97,332	56.13%	1,216	0.70%
1992	54,621	29.01%	86,026	45.69%	47,618	25.29%
1996	48,513	28.17%	105,050	60.99%	18,676	10.84%
2000	59,558	34.61%	100,103	58.17%	12,432	7.22%
2004	70,925	38.00%	113,710	60.93%	2,004	1.07%
2008	71,350	36.09%	121,454	61.43%	4,916	2.49%
2012	73,392	36.62%	123,619	61.69%	3,388	1.69%
2016	78,685	38.18%	112,590	54.63%	14,826	7.19%
2020	87,318	40.02%	125,948	57.73%	4,911	2.25%
2024	92,474	44.33%	110,937	53.18%	5,193	2.49%

County-level state agency heads
Clerk of Courts:	Laura S. Gentile (D)
District Attorney:	Anthony Gulluni (D)
Register of Deeds:	Cheryl Coakley-Rivera (D)
Register of Probate:	Suzanne Seguin (I)
County Sheriff:	Nicholas Cocchi (D)
State government
State Representative(s):	by community
State Senator(s):	by community
Governor's Councilor(s):	Tara Jacobs (D) 8th District; Paul DePalo (D) 7th District
Federal government
U.S. Representative(s):	Richard Neal (D-1st District),
U.S. Senators:	Elizabeth Warren (D), Ed Markey (D)

Voter registration and party enrollment as of February 2024
Unenrolled	219,200	62.5%
Democratic	91,495	26.09%
Republican	35,661	10.17%
Libertarian	1,416	0.4%
Other parties	2,971	0.85%
Total	350,743	100%

== Geography ==
Cities and Towns of Hampden County

1	Chester
2	Blandford
3	Tolland
4	Granville
5	Russell
6	Montgomery
7	Westfield
8	Southwick

9	Holyoke
10	Chicopee
11	West Springfield
12	Springfield
13	Agawam
14	Longmeadow
15	East Longmeadow
16	Ludlow

17	Wilbraham
18	Hampden
19	Palmer
20	Monson
21	Brimfield
22	Wales
23	Holland

According to the U.S. Census Bureau, the county has a total area of 634 square miles (1,640 km^{2}), of which 617 square miles (1,600 km^{2}) is land and 17 square miles (44 km^{2}) (2.7%) is water.

=== Adjacent counties ===
- Hampshire County (north)
- Worcester County (east)
- Tolland County, Connecticut (southeast)
- Hartford County, Connecticut (south)
- Litchfield County, Connecticut (southwest)
- Berkshire County (west)

== Communities ==
=== Cities ===
- Agawam
- Chicopee
- Holyoke
- Palmer
- Springfield (traditional county seat)
- West Springfield
- Westfield

=== Towns ===
- Blandford
- Brimfield
- Chester
- East Longmeadow
- Granville
- Hampden
- Holland
- Longmeadow
- Ludlow
- Monson
- Montgomery
- Russell
- Southwick
- Tolland
- Wales
- Wilbraham

=== Census-designated places ===
- Blandford
- Chester
- Holland
- Monson Center
- Russell
- Wilbraham

=== Other unincorporated communities ===
- Bondsville
- Depot Village
- Feeding Hills
- Three Rivers
- Woronoco

=== City neighborhoods ===
The following are neighborhoods located in Springfield or West Springfield.

- Bay
- Boston Road
- Brightwood
- East Forest Park
- East Springfield
- Forest Park
- Indian Orchard
- Liberty Heights
- McKnight
- Memorial Square
- Merrick
- Metro Center
- Old Hill
- Pine Point
- Six Corners and Maple Heights
- Sixteen Acres
- South End
- Upper Hill

The following are neighborhoods located in Chicopee.

- Aldenville
- Burnett Road
- Chicopee Center (Cabotville)
- Chicopee Falls
- Fairview
- Smith Highlands
- Westover
- Willimansett

The following are neighborhoods located in Holyoke.

- Churchill
- Downtown
- Elmwood
- The Flats
- Highlands
- Highland Park
- Homestead Avenue
- Ingleside
- Jarvis Avenue
- Oakdale
- Rock Valley
- Smith's Ferry
- South Holyoke
- Springdale
- Whiting Farms

=== National Parks ===
- Springfield Armory National Historic Site

=== State parks ===
- Brimfield State Forest
- Chester-Blandford State Forest
- Chicopee Memorial State Park
- Connecticut River Greenway State Park
- Hampton Ponds State Park
- Holyoke Heritage State Park
- Lake Lorraine State Park (CLOSED)
- Mount Tom State Reservation
- Tolland State Forest

== Demographics ==
Historical population
Census	Pop.	Note	%±
1820	28,021		—
1830	31,639		12.9%
1840	37,366		18.1%
1850	51,283		37.2%
1860	57,366		11.9%
1870	78,409		36.7%
1880	104,142		32.8%
1890	135,713		30.3%
1900	175,603		29.4%
1910	231,369		31.8%
1920	300,305		29.8%
1930	335,496		11.7%
1940	332,107		−1.0%
1950	367,971		10.8%
1960	429,353		16.7%
1970	459,050		6.9%
1980	443,018		−3.5%
1990	456,310		3.0%
2000	456,228		0.0%
2010	463,490		1.6%
2020	465,825		0.5%
2025 (est.)	464,338	▼	−0.3%
U.S. Decennial Census; 1790–1960 1900–1990; 1990–2000 2010-2020

=== 2020 census ===
As of the 2020 census, the county had a population of 465,825. Of the residents, 21.1% were under the age of 18 and 18.2% were 65 years of age or older; the median age was 40.2 years. For every 100 females there were 93.1 males, and for every 100 females age 18 and over there were 90.0 males. 90.5% of residents lived in urban areas and 9.5% lived in rural areas.

The racial makeup of the county was 64.9% White, 8.9% Black or African American, 0.5% American Indian and Alaska Native, 2.6% Asian, 0.1% Native Hawaiian and Pacific Islander, 12.7% from some other race, and 10.3% from two or more races. Hispanic or Latino residents of any race comprised 26.0% of the population. There were 185,030 households in the county, of which 28.8% had children under the age of 18 living with them and 33.2% had a female householder with no spouse or partner present. About 30.6% of all households were made up of individuals and 13.3% had someone living alone who was 65 years of age or older.

There were 197,033 housing units, of which 6.1% were vacant. Among occupied housing units, 60.6% were owner-occupied and 39.4% were renter-occupied. The homeowner vacancy rate was 1.1% and the rental vacancy rate was 5.1%.

=== Racial and ethnic composition ===
Hampden County, Massachusetts – Racial and ethnic composition Note: the US Census treats Hispanic/Latino as an ethnic category. This table excludes Latinos from the racial categories and assigns them to a separate category. Hispanics/Latinos may be of any race.
Race / Ethnicity (NH = Non-Hispanic)	Pop 1980	Pop 1990	Pop 2000	Pop 2010	Pop 2020	% 1980	% 1990	% 2000	% 2010	% 2020
White alone (NH)	389,831	373,426	339,625	313,846	278,464	87.99%	81.84%	74.44%	67.71%	59.78%
Black or African American alone (NH)	27,207	32,105	34,034	35,692	35,988	6.14%	7.04%	7.46%	7.70%	7.73%
Native American alone (NH)	472	668	769	717	659	0.11%	0.15%	0.17%	0.15%	0.14%
Asian alone (NH)	1,565	3,705	5,835	8,937	12,110	0.35%	0.81%	1.28%	1.93%	2.60%
Pacific Islander alone (NH)	x	x	143	114	169	x	x	0.03%	0.02%	0.04%
Other race alone (NH)	1,201	621	505	588	1,945	0.27%	0.14%	0.11%	0.13%	0.42%
Mixed race or Multiracial (NH)	x	x	6,120	6,820	15,171	x	x	1.34%	1.47%	3.26%
Hispanic or Latino (any race)	22,742	45,785	69,197	96,776	121,319	5.13%	10.03%	15.17%	20.88%	26.04%
Total	443,018	456,310	456,228	463,490	465,825	100.00%	100.00%	100.00%	100.00%	100.00%

=== 2010 census ===
As of the 2010 United States census, there were 463,490 people, 179,927 households, and 115,961 families residing in the county. The population density was 751.0 inhabitants per square mile (290.0/km^{2}). There were 192,175 housing units at an average density of 311.4 per square mile (120.2/km^{2}). The racial makeup of the county was 76.5% white, 9.0% black or African American, 2.0% Asian, 0.4% American Indian, 0.1% Pacific islander, 9.2% from other races, and 2.9% from two or more races. Those of Hispanic or Latino origin made up 20.9% of the population. The largest ancestry groups were:

- 17.9% Puerto Rican
- 17.4% Irish
- 12.7% French
- 11.0% Polish
- 10.8% Italian
- 8.8% English
- 6.0% German
- 5.5% French Canadian
- 2.6% American
- 2.2% Portuguese
- 2.0% Scottish
- 1.6% Russian
- 1.4% West Indian
- 1.3% Scotch-Irish
- 1.1% Swedish

Of the 179,927 households, 32.6% had children under the age of 18 living with them, 41.9% were married couples living together, 17.5% had a female householder with no husband present, 35.6% were non-families, and 29.2% of all households were made up of individuals. The average household size was 2.49 and the average family size was 3.09. The median age was 38.6 years.

The median income for a household in the county was $47,724 and the median income for a family was $61,061. Males had a median income of $50,207 versus $37,765 for females. The per capita income for the county was $24,718. About 13.2% of families and 17.2% of the population were below the poverty line, including 26.5% of those under age 18 and 11.2% of those age 65 or over.

=== Demographic breakdown by town ===
==== Income ====
The ranking of unincorporated communities that are included on the list are reflective if the census designated locations and villages were included as cities or towns. Data is from the 2007–2011 American Community Survey 5-Year Estimates.

Rank	Town		Per capita income	Median household income	Median family income	Population	Number of households
1	Longmeadow	Town	$50,203	$100,092	$111,803	15,772	5,605
2	Wilbraham	Town	$39,372	$88,839	$107,871	14,145	5,393
3	Hampden	Town	$38,396	$79,773	$103,173	5,134	1,960
4	Montgomery	Town	$36,575	$78,125	$90,313	742	291
5	Tolland	Town	$36,567	$67,083	$75,625	434	164
6	Blandford	Town	$36,412	$78,875	$82,656	1,174	462
	Massachusetts	State	$35,051	$65,981	$83,371	6,512,227	2,522,409
7	East Longmeadow	Town	$34,417	$76,517	$89,570	15,555	5,660
8	Southwick	Town	$33,753	$74,721	$86,915	9,425	3,657
9	Wales	Town	$32,129	$60,938	$70,536	1,914	773
10	Granville	Town	$32,050	$71,667	$85,625	1,444	554
11	Brimfield	Town	$31,671	$78,380	$86,695	3,582	1,385
12	Monson	Town	$31,274	$70,485	$86,333	8,531	3,318
	Monson Center	CDP	$29,938	$50,242	$51,691	1,880	846
13	Agawam	City	$29,914	$65,339	$76,258	28,408	11,506
14	Holland	Town	$29,835	$69,565	$79,779	2,595	998
15	West Springfield	City	$27,946	$54,251	$63,954	28,320	11,571
	United States	Country	$27,915	$52,762	$64,293	306,603,772	114,761,359
16	Palmer	City	$27,694	$50,864	$58,144	12,161	5,006
17	Ludlow	Town	$27,644	$60,694	$73,048	21,131	7,876
18	Chester	Town	$27,630	$56,711	$69,063	1,320	528
19	Westfield	City	$26,605	$53,772	$72,210	41,025	15,207
20	Russell	Town	$25,600	$60,398	$72,759	1,846	681
	Hampden County	County	$25,363	$48,866	$61,800	462,752	177,954
21	Chicopee	City	$23,703	$45,763	$58,118	55,205	23,136
22	Holyoke	City	$20,370	$33,915	$42,033	39,897	16,012
23	Springfield	City	$18,483	$35,603	$41,454	152,992	56,211

== Education ==
=== Colleges and universities ===
- American International College
- Bay Path University
- Elms College
- Holyoke Community College
- Springfield College
- Springfield Technical Community College
- Western New England University

- Western New England University School of Law

- Westfield State University

=== Public school districts ===
- Agawam Public Schools
- Chicopee Public Schools
- East Longmeadow Public Schools
- Gateway Regional School District (Blandford, Chester, Huntington, Middlefield, Montgomery, Russell and Worthington)
- Hampden-Wilbraham Regional School District
- Holyoke Public Schools
- Longmeadow Public Schools
- Monson Public Schools
- Palmer Public Schools
- Southwick-Tolland-Granville Regional School District
- Springfield Public Schools
- Westfield Public Schools
- West Springfield Public Schools

=== Other institutions ===
Although no county government exists in Hampden County, a number of private associations, mainly representing trades, remain identified with Hampden County. For example the Hampden Agricultural Society opened Hampden Park in Springfield in 1853. To maintain current training among municipal inspectors, in 2005 the nongovernmental Hampden County Plumbing & Gas Inspectors Association was formed. The Hampden County Bar Association provides support and resources to the legal community and those seeking such representation. In part a legacy of the Eastern States Exposition, the Hampden County Improvement League, and Hampden County Beekeepers Association, both provide agricultural education and outreach. The Hampden County Radio Association, an affiliate of the ARRL, offers training in amateur radio and related technology.

== Transportation ==
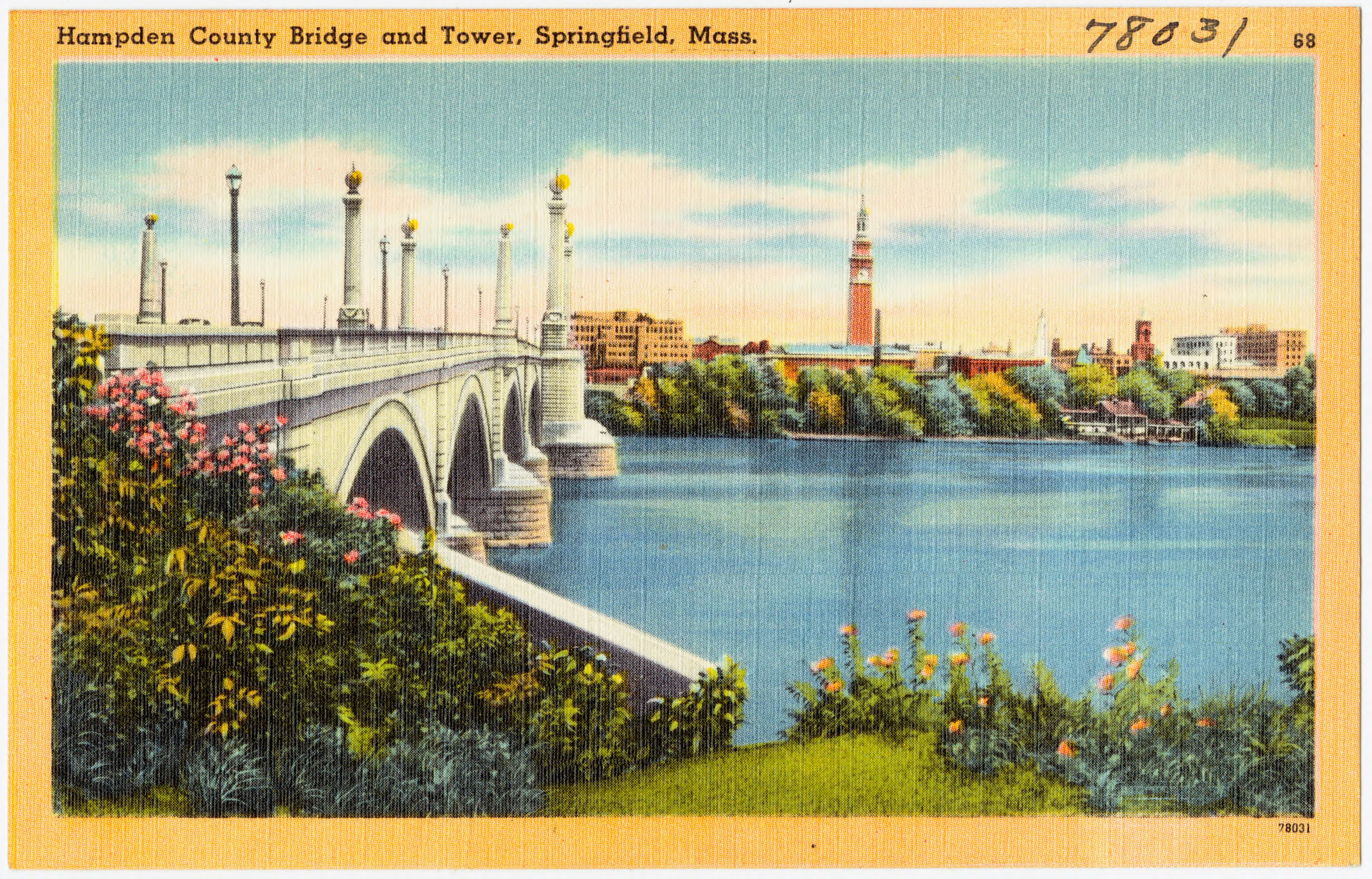
Hampden County Memorial Bridge over the Connecticut, connecting Springfield/West Springfield, c. 1945

=== Highways ===
Hampden County serves as a major transportation crossroads for Western New England, anchored by two primary Interstate Highways: Interstate 90 (the Massachusetts Turnpike), the region's main east–west toll highway, and Interstate 91, which runs north–south along the Connecticut River valley through Springfield, West Springfield, and Holyoke. The Springfield metropolitan area is further served by auxiliary routes Interstate 291 and Interstate 391, while Interstate 84 clips the southeastern corner of the county in Holland. Three U.S. Routes also pass through Hampden County: U.S. Route 5 parallels I-91 along the river, U.S. Route 20 provides a major east–west surface corridor from Chester to Brimfield, and U.S. Route 202 runs north–south through Southwick, Westfield, and Holyoke.

Key east–west state routes include Massachusetts Route 23 and Massachusetts Route 57 in the western hilltowns, as well as Massachusetts Route 147 in West Springfield and Agawam. Primary north–south state corridors include Massachusetts Route 10 (concurrent with US 202), Massachusetts Route 21, Massachusetts Route 32, Massachusetts Route 33, Massachusetts Route 67, Massachusetts Route 116, Massachusetts Route 141, and Massachusetts Route 181, along with Route 75, Route 83, and Route 159 connecting the southern suburbs into Connecticut.

=== Public transportation ===
Hampden County is served by both bus and rail service, with intermodal connections at Springfield Union Station, and Holyoke station via the Holyoke Transportation Center. Additionally the region is served by the Westfield-Barnes Regional Airport, and Westover Metropolitan Airport. A bike share program, ValleyBike, connects Springfield, Chicopee, Holyoke and West Springfield to points north in Hampshire County.

==== Bus ====
- PVTA
- Peter Pan Bus Lines

==== Rail ====
- Hartford Line
- Valley Flyer

== See also ==
- List of Massachusetts locations by per capita income
- National Register of Historic Places listings in Hampden County, Massachusetts
- Registry of Deeds (Massachusetts)
- Tofu Curtain
- USS Hampden County
