= Palmer Motorsports Park =

Motorsports park in Hampden County, Massachusetts

Coordinates: 42.23605°N 72.24442°W

PMP
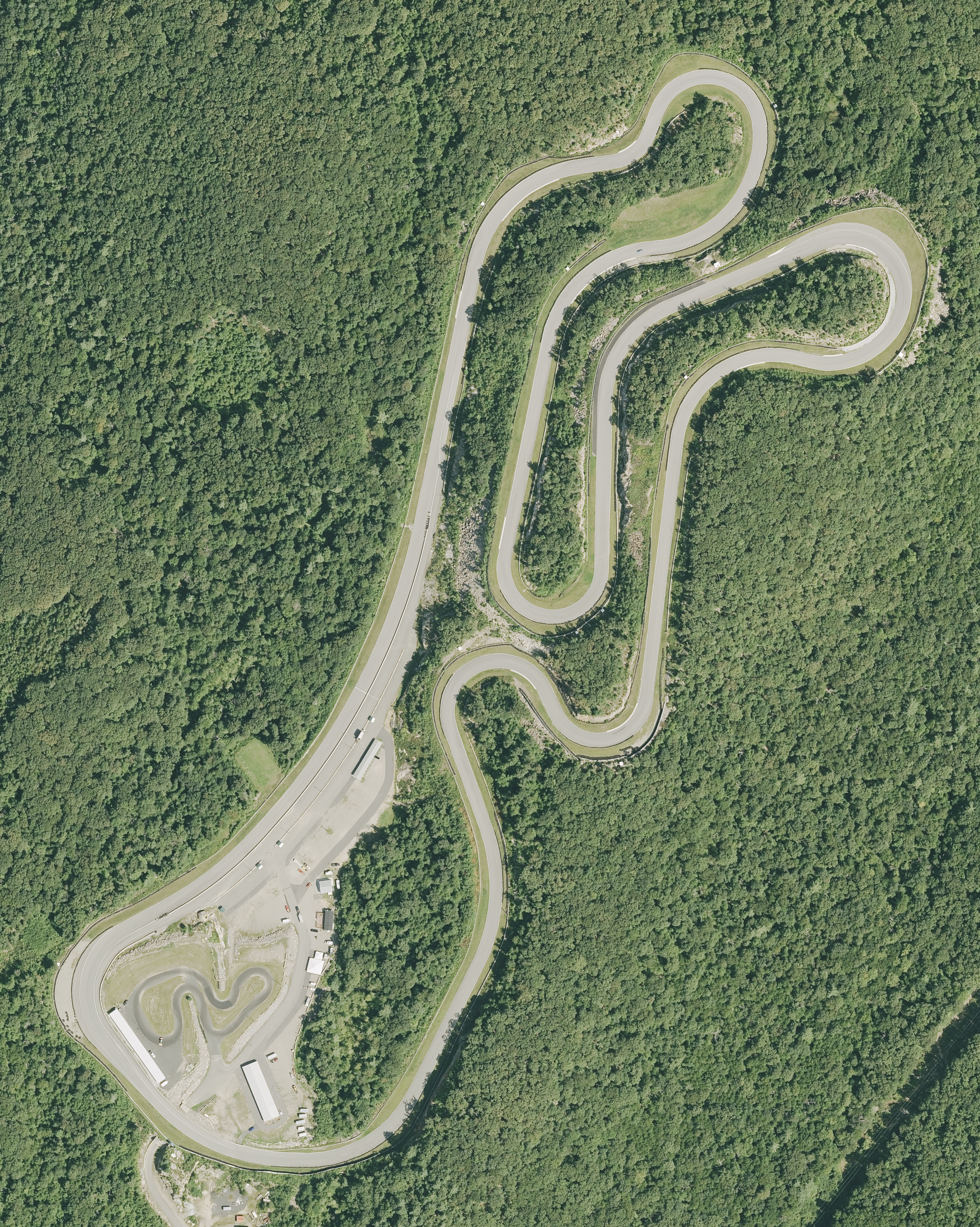
- 2023 aerial photo
- Address: 58 W Ware Rd; Palmer, MA 01069
- Opened: May 2015
- Website: palmermotorsportspark.com

Whiskey Hill Raceway
- Length: 2.3 mi (3.7 km)
- Turns: 14

Palmer Motorsports Park is an operating motorsports park in Hampden County, Massachusetts, located at the intersection of West Ware Road and Bacon Road in the town of Palmer. The creation of the track was approved by Palmer on December 4, 2007, and in 2009 underwent review by the Massachusetts Department of Environmental Protection.

Palmer was to be a "flagship" track of the New England Region (NER) of the Sports Car Club of America. Like Buttonwillow Raceway Park in California, owned and operated by SCCA's Cal Club Region, Palmer was to be owned and operated by a limited liability company created by NER. The Track search commission started in the early 2000s. In addition to Palmer, as of 2015 NER operates at New Hampshire Motor Speedway in Loudon, New Hampshire, Lime Rock Park in Lakeville, Connecticut, and Thompson Speedway Motorsports Park in Thompson, Connecticut. Due to their heavy use by NASCAR and other racing entities, the costs of renting these tracks has become higher (combined with the remote location and high cost of lodging at Lime Rock), and as part of the club's continuing mission to provide more opportunities for its members to race, NER proposed the creation of their own track. However, the region has divested itself of any legal and financial responsibility for the creation and operation of the track as of early 2015. Despite delays with the previous developers, work on Palmer continued by partners Fred Ferguson and Jonathan Fryer in 2014–2015.

Palmer Motorsports Park opened in May 2015. The Whiskey Hill Raceway at Palmer Motorsports Park features a 2.3-mile road course with 190 feet of elevation and 14 turns.

Since its opening, there have been complaints about the sound from the race track, and claims it has been a nuisance to neighboring communities. The track was built on a mountain overlooking 3 towns. The operators have taken many measures, including erection of sound barriers as stipulated to "implement proper mitigation measures so as to remedy all of the noise conditions". While these efforts were initially hampered by the supply chain issues incurred during the COVID-19 pandemic, the work was completed successfully. Extensive testing was performed on May 2, 2021, after the track had complied (per court documents) with mitigation requirements. The track continues to perform testing of sound to assure compliance with mitigation requirements. To help ensure compliance, the track has implemented noise restrictions for vehicles using the track. The current limit is 95 dBA, measured at random locations around the track while it is in use.

Road & Track magazine named Palmer Motorsports Park one of the top 10 racetracks to drive in North America.
