= Sts. Peter and Paul Church (Three Rivers) =

Coordinates: 42°11′.3″N 72°21′19.5″W

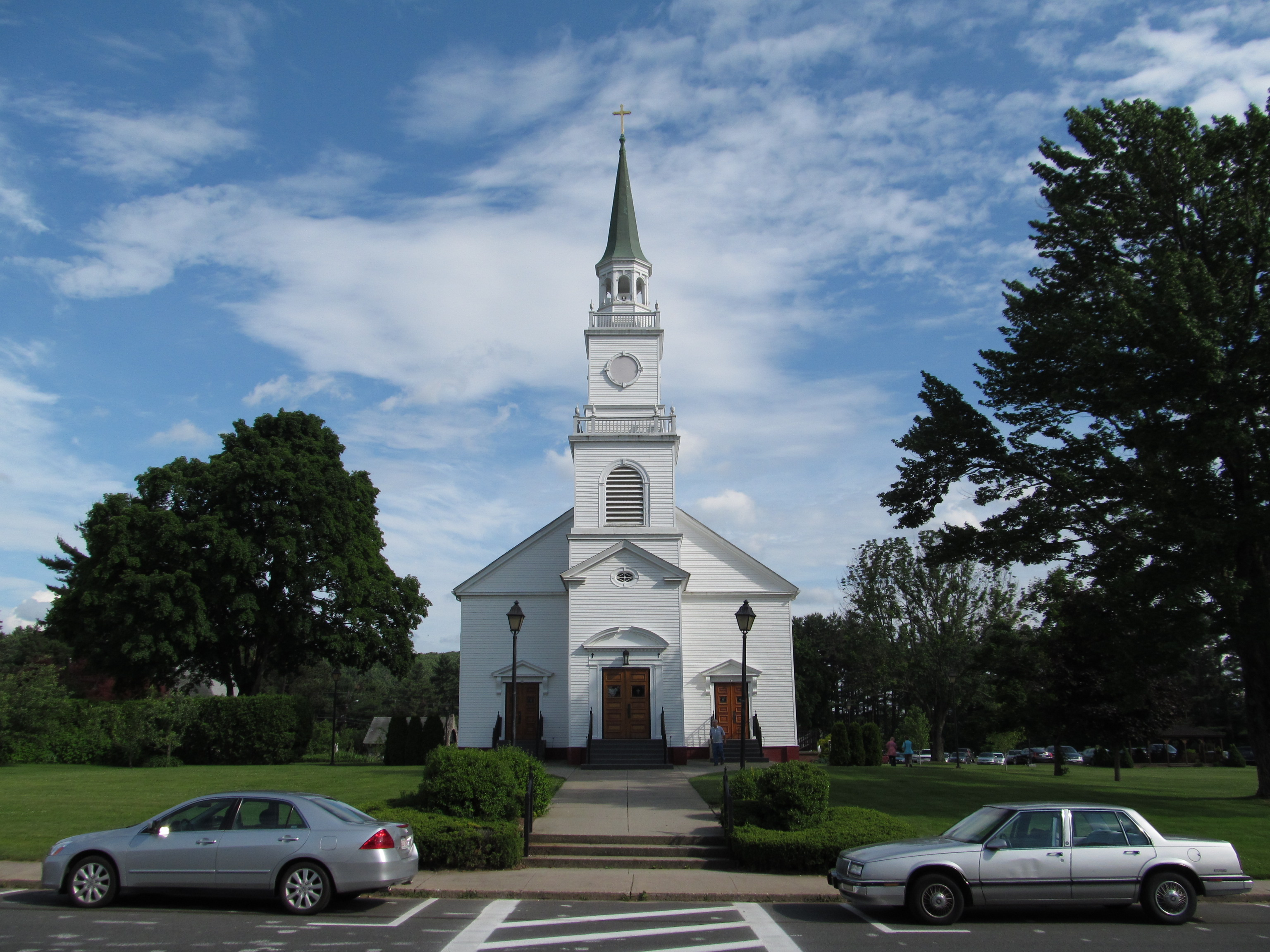
- SS. Peter and Paul Church
- Sts. Peter and Paul Church
- Location: 2267 Main Street; Three Rivers, Massachusetts
- Country: United States
- Denomination: Roman Catholic
- Website: Parish website

History
- Founded: July 1902
- Founder: Polish immigrants
- Dedication: Saints Peter and Paul
- Dedicated: September 24, 1905
- Consecrated: 1905

Architecture
- Style: Neo-Baroque (interior)
- Groundbreaking: 1903
- Completed: 1905

Administration
- Division: Region 8
- Province: Boston
- Diocese: Diocese of Springfield in Massachusetts
- Parish: Divine Mercy Parish

Clergy
- Bishop: William Draper Byrne
- Pastor: Stefan J. Niemczyk

Sts. Peter and Paul Church (Polish: Kościół ŚŚ Piotra i Pawła w Three Rivers) is a Roman Catholic church, designated for Polish immigrants in Three Rivers, Massachusetts, United States. Founded in 1903, it is one of the Polish-American Roman Catholic parishes in New England in the Diocese of Springfield in Massachusetts.

In 2010, the neighboring St. Anne Parish closed and merged with Sts. Peter and Paul Parish to form Divine Mercy Parish at Sts. Peter and Paul Church.

== History ==
According to the record, the first Polish immigrant arrived in the town of Palmer in the year 1886. Through the efforts of Fr. Franciszek Chalupka, the small group of Polish settlers in Three Rivers, Thorndike and Bondsville were organized as the St. Joseph Men's Society of Thorndike in April 1895.

In 1899, the St. Joseph's Society chose representatives and the committee visited Bishop Daniel T. Beaven. With the assistance of a lawyer, David Dillon, they finally were granted permission to organize and to establish the Sts. Peter and Paul Parish at Four Corners in Three Rivers.

In July 1902, Beaven appointed Wacław Lenz as the first pastor for Polish descent residing in the towns at Four Corners. At the first meeting they decided to build the church in the center of the town of Palmer and chose the present site in the village of Three Rivers opposite the Town Hall.

== Pastors ==
- Venceslaus (Wacław) Lenz (1902–1911)
- Władysław Kielbasinski (1911–1913)
- Andrew (Andrzej) Krzywda (1913–1947)
- Joseph (Józef) Szczepaniak (1947–1948)
- Alphonse A. Skoniecki (1948–1972)
- Robert J. Ceckowski (1972–1997)
- Stefan J. Niemczyk (1997–)

== Bibliography ==
- A short parish history the 1955 Jubilee Book. SS Peter & Paul Parish - Three Rivers MA: the internet Polish Genealogical Source.
- The 150th Anniversary of Polish-American Pastoral Ministry. Webster, Massachusetts: St. Joseph Basilica. September 11, 2005.
- The Official Catholic Directory in USA
