= Pynchon Park =

Sports venue in Springfield, Massachusetts

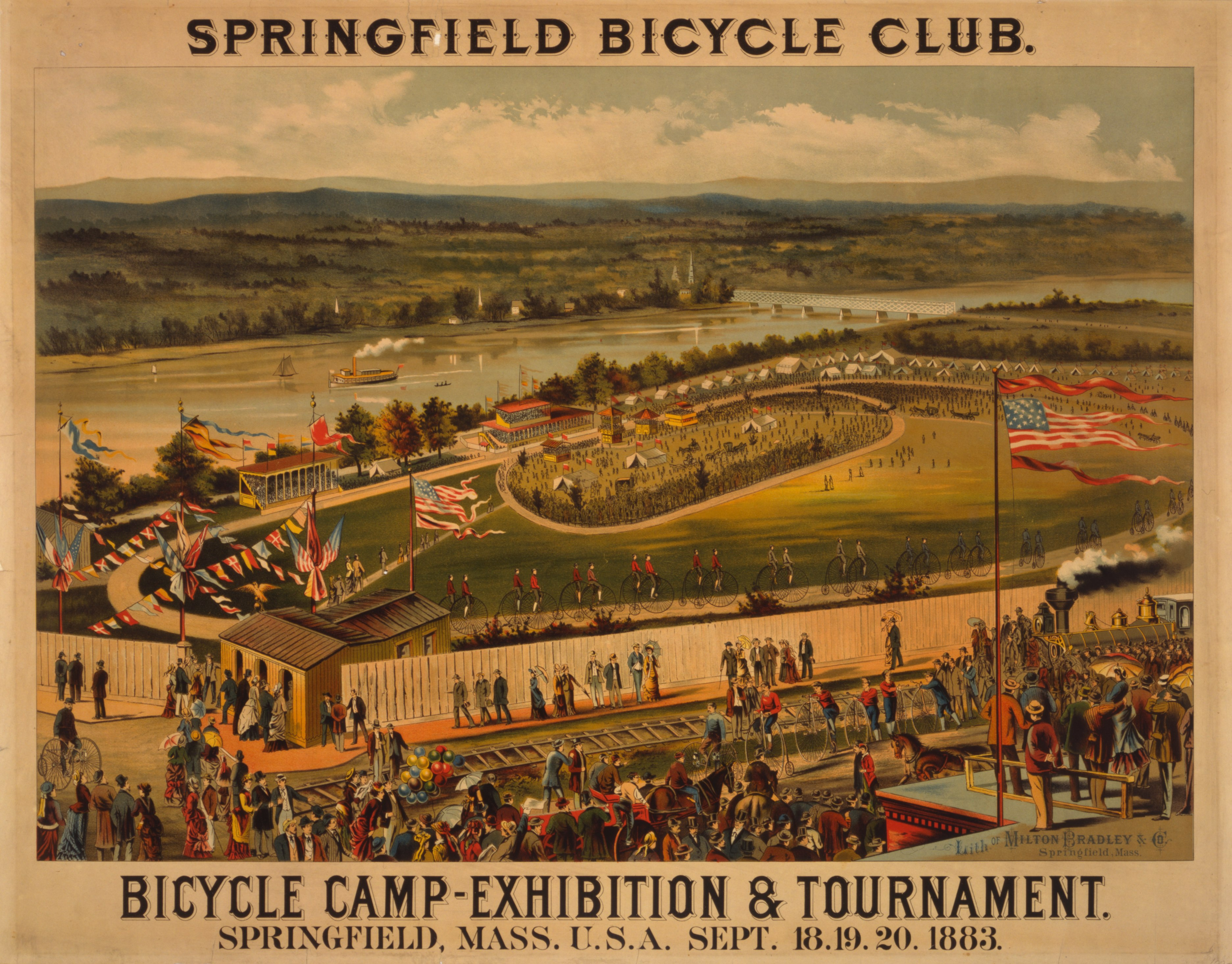
- A poster promoting a Springfield Bicycle Club event in September 1883 when the stadium was known as Hampden Park
- Interactive map of Pynchon Park
- Location: Springfield, Massachusetts
- Coordinates: 42.1102°N 72.6103°W

Construction
- Opened: 1853
- Closed: 1966

Tenants
- Springfield Bicycle Club; Springfield Giants; Springfield Acorns

Pynchon Park, also known as Hampden Park and League Park, was a sports venue in Springfield, Massachusetts. It was opened in 1853 by the Hampden Agricultural Society and was destroyed by fire in 1966.

The venue hosted various events, including horse racing, bicycle racing, and college football (including several editions of the Harvard–Yale football rivalry). It also served as home grounds for the minor-league baseball team primarily known as the Springfield Ponies.

== Hampden Park ==
In 1853, the Hampden Agricultural Society paid $15,405 for the land on the site with the intention of creating a venue for the National Trotting Organization to hold its meetings. The facilities were also used for a broader range of recreational activities. With the advent of the American Civil War, Hampden Park was used as a muster point for the 10th Massachusetts Infantry Regiment. The 46th Massachusetts Infantry Regiment was primarily recruited in Hampden County

In 1885 and 1896, cycling's hour record was unofficially broken multiple times at Hampden Park.

Renamed in 1940 for early settler William Pynchon, the park came down in a blaze in 1966.

=== College football ===
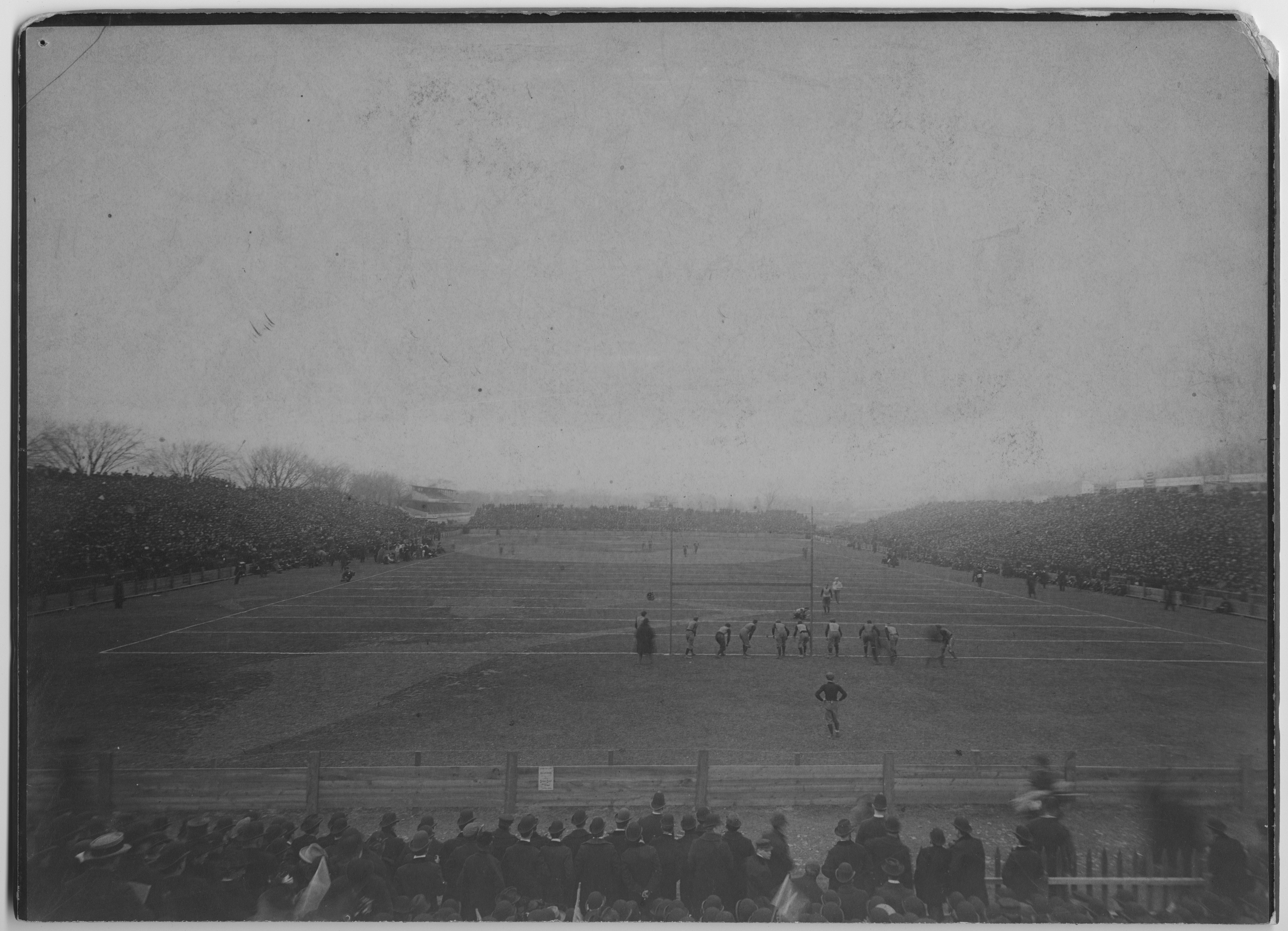
1894 Harvard–Yale football game at Hampden Park

Date	Winning team	Result	Losing team	References
November 24, 1881	Amherst	0–0	Dartmouth	
October 30, 1889	Wesleyan	20–17	Williams	
November 9, 1889	Harvard	67–2	Wesleyan	
November 16, 1889	Yale	52–0	Wesleyan	
November 22, 1889	Lehigh	11–11	Wesleyan	
November 23, 1889	Dartmouth	20–9	Williams	
November 23, 1889	Yale	6–0	Harvard	
November 12, 1890	Harvard	64–0	Amherst	
November 21, 1890	Wesleyan	34–6	Brown	
November 22, 1890	Harvard	12–6	Yale	
November 21, 1891	Yale	10–0	Harvard	
October 26, 1892	Yale	50–0	Springfield YMCA	
November 19, 1892	Yale	6–0	Harvard	
November 25, 1893	Yale	6–0	Harvard	
October 17, 1894	Yale	34–0	Dartmouth	
November 24, 1894	Brown	20-4	Dartmouth	
November 24, 1894	Yale	12–4	Harvard	
November 25, 1905	Dartmouth	24–6	Brown	
October 27, 1906	Dartmouth	0–0	Williams	
November 24, 1906	Brown	23–0	Dartmouth	

=== The Hampden Park Blood Bath ===
Hampden Park provided a neutral venue between Cambridge and New Haven suitable for the annual Harvard-Yale game between 1889 and 1894, but the 1894 edition led to such violence and injury that the match was suspended for two years. It subsequently became known as the Hampden Park Blood Bath, also known as the Springfield Massacre.
