= Reed V. Hillman =

American law enforcement officer and politician

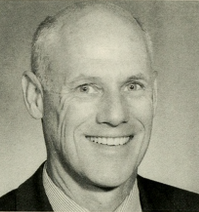
- Hillman c. 2003

Member of the Massachusetts House of Representatives from the 1st Hampden district
- In office 1999–2005
- Preceded by: Patrick Landers
- Succeeded by: Todd Smola

Personal details
- Born: November 30, 1948 (age 77) Waltham, Massachusetts
- Party: Republican
- Education: Babson College; Suffolk University Law School
- Occupation: Massachusetts State Trooper; Politician

Reed V. Hillman (born November 30, 1948, in Waltham, Massachusetts) is an American law enforcement officer and politician who was the Republican nominee for Lieutenant Governor of Massachusetts for the 2006 gubernatorial election in Massachusetts, as well as a former Massachusetts State Representative. He currently lives in Sturbridge, Massachusetts with his wife and two children.

== Pre-politics ==
Hillman was born and raised in Newton, graduating from Newton North High School in 1966. Hillman's father was a World War II veteran and his mother stayed at home to take care of her four children, of which Reed was the oldest.

Hillman graduated from Suffolk Law School in 1974 and continued to pass the bar exam. The same year Hillman would begin his 25-year career with the Massachusetts State Police.

In 1996, Hillman was named superintendent of the State Police by Governor William Weld. Hillman became responsible for more than 2,600 law enforcement personnel and an annual budget of over $200 million. Among Hillman's accomplishments as superintendent were the creation of the state police affirmative action program and the construction of new statewide crime labs.

Though his service as superintendent of the Massachusetts State Police generally received praise, it also received some criticism from feminists. This criticism stems from a policy of placing pregnant female troopers on restricted duty.

== Political career ==
In 1999, Hillman retired from the State Police and decided to run for State Representative in a special election. Hillman was successful and became vocal in the Massachusetts State Legislature. His most passionate issues were those of public safety, including his support for the Amber alert, expanding the State Police DNA database, and tougher drunk driving legislation.

In the state legislature, Hillman represented the First Hampden District, consisting of the towns of Brimfield, Holland, Palmer and Wales, all in Hampden County; precincts B and C in the town of Ware, in Hampshire County; and the towns of Sturbridge and Warren, both in Worcester County. He declined to seek re-election to the seat in 2004, and was succeeded by Palmer Board of Selectmen Chairman Todd M. Smola, a fellow Republican and Hillman's former aide.

In 2005, Hillman was suggested by Governor Mitt Romney to be considered for the position of U.S. Marshal for Massachusetts. The following year the lieutenant governor, and Republican nominee for governor, Kerry Healey, chose Hillman as her running mate for the 2006 election. The pair lost to Deval Patrick and Tim Murray in the general election in November by a wide margin.

Hillman now teaches at Mount Wachusett Community College, in Gardner MA, teaching criminal justice courses.

Party political offices
Preceded by Kerry Healey	Republican nominee for Lieutenant Governor of Massachusetts; 2006	Succeeded by Richard Tisei
