= Palmer High School (Massachusetts) =

Coordinates: 42°11′14.81″N 72°20′18.41″W

Palmer High School MA (Massachusetts)
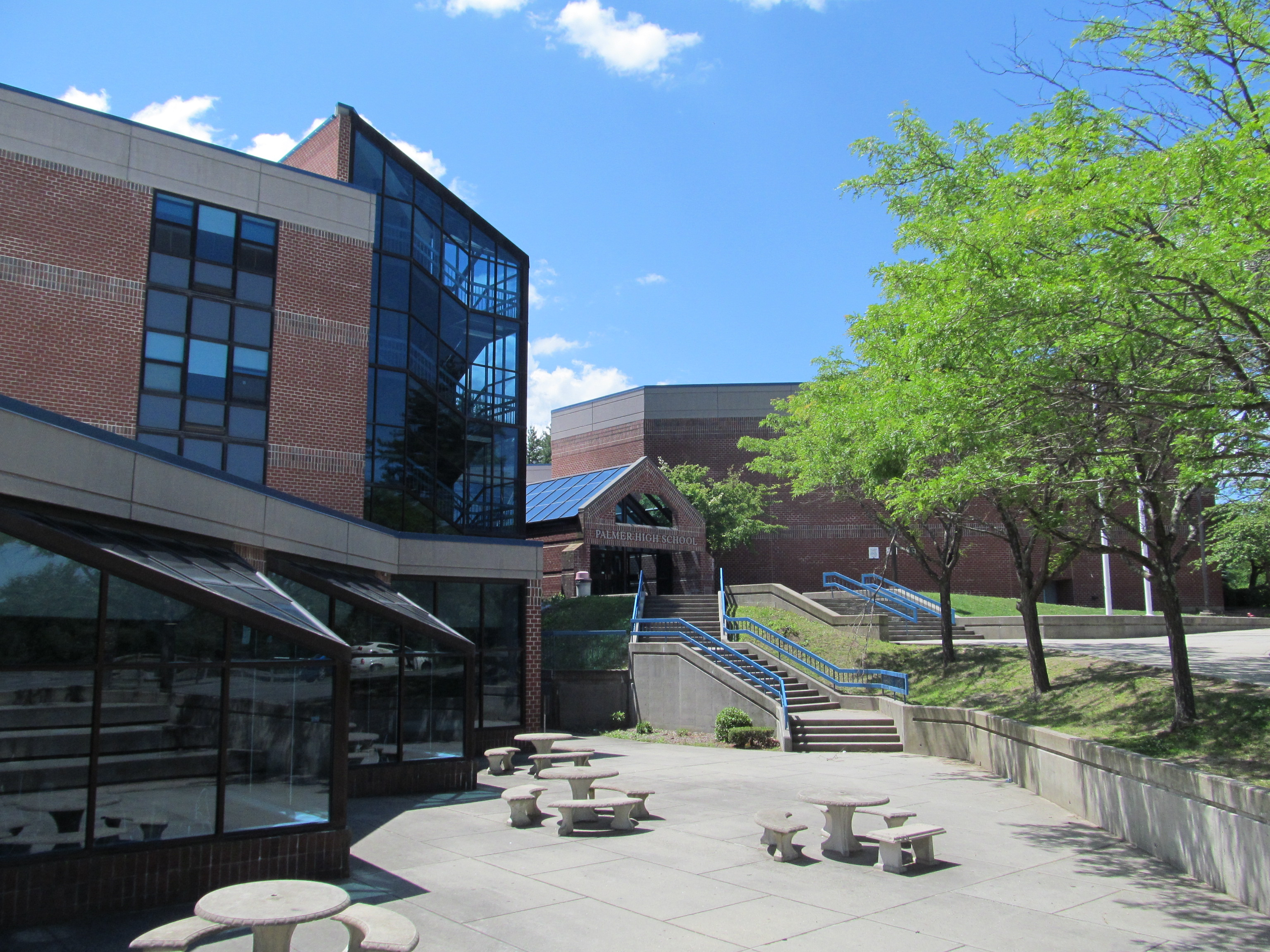
- Palmer High School

Location
- 4105 Main Street; Palmer, Massachusetts 01069; United States

Information
- Type: Public High School; Open enrollment
- Established: 1991
- Superintendent: ------
- Principal: -----
- Teaching staff: 46.95 (FTE)
- Grades: 7–12
- Student to teacher ratio: 8.86
- Hours in school day: 7:15am-1:51pm
- Colors: Blue and White
- Athletics: CoSinging
- Mascot: Panther
- Rivals: Ludlow
- Accreditation: New England Association of Schools and Colleges
- Website: www.palmerschools.org/apps/pages/index.jsp?uREC_ID=293370&type=d

Palmer High School is a public high school located in the town of Palmer, Massachusetts, United States.

== Demographics and statistics ==
For the 2015–2016 school year, Palmer High School enrolled 489 students in grades 8 through 12. Of these students, 88.8% were Caucasian, 2.0% were African American, 5.1% were Hispanic, 0.0% were Native American, 0.2% were Native Hawaiian/Pacific Islander and 1.4% were Multi-Ethnic. About 52.1% of the student population is male, while 47.9% is female.

== Notable alumni ==
- Bill Karlon, professional baseball player for the New York Yankees
- Todd Smola, member of Massachusetts House of Representatives
