= Palmer (CDP), Massachusetts =

Palmer, Massachusetts
- Former CDP
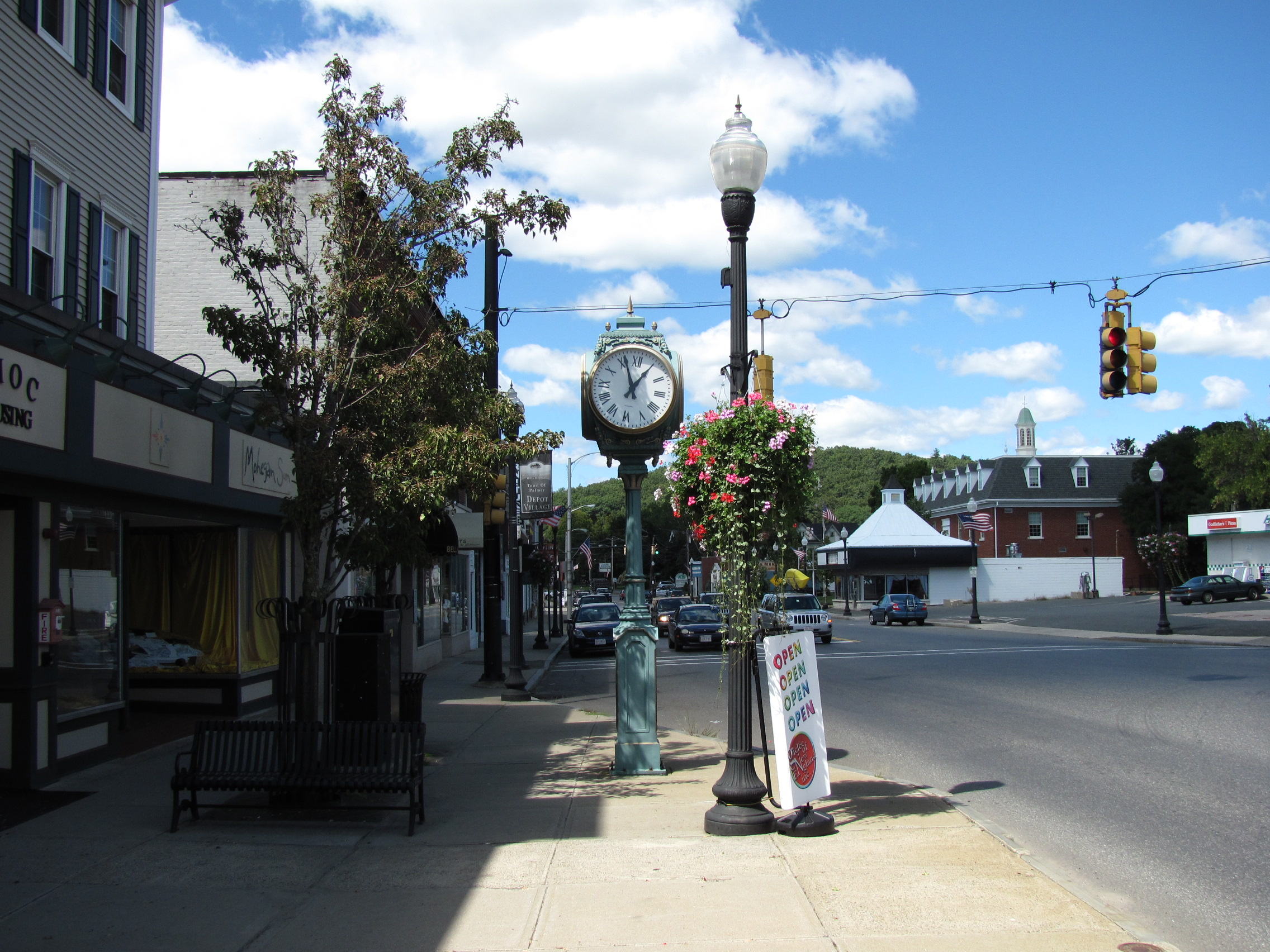
- Main Street
- Interactive map of Palmer, Massachusetts
- Coordinates: 42°9′26″N 72°19′37″W
- Country: United States
- State: Massachusetts
- County: Hampden
- City: Palmer

Area
  - Total: 4.1 sq mi (10.7 km^{2})
  - Land: 4.1 sq mi (10.6 km^{2})
  - Water: 0.039 sq mi (0.1 km^{2})
- Elevation: 344 ft (105 m)

Population (2000)
  - Total: 3,900
  - Density: 954/sq mi (368.4/km^{2})
- Time zone: UTC-5 (Eastern (EST))
  - Summer (DST): UTC-4 (EDT)
- ZIP code: 01069
- Area code: 413
- FIPS code: 25-52070
- GNIS feature ID: 0609578

Palmer is former census-designated place (CDP) in Hampden County, Massachusetts, United States. The population was 3,900 at the 2000 census. It is part of the Springfield, Massachusetts Metropolitan Statistical Area. The area is more commonly known as Depot Village, named for the ornate train depot built there by famed architect H.H. Richardson

== Geography ==
Palmer is located at 42°9′25″N 72°19′36″W (42.157157, -72.326855).

According to the United States Census Bureau, the CDP had a total area of 10.6 km^{2} (4.1 sq mi), of which 10.6 km^{2} (4.1 sq mi) is land and 0.1 km^{2} (0.039 sq mi) (0.73%) is water.

== Demographics ==
As of the census of 2000, there were 3,900 people, 1,778 households, and 970 families residing in the CDP. The population density was 368.2 people/km^{2} (954 people/mi^{2}). There were 1,874 housing units at an average density of 176.9 units/km^{2} (458 units/mi^{2}). The racial makeup of the CDP was 95.33% White, 1.44% Black or African American, 0.28% Native American, 1.03% Asian, 0.51% from other races, and 1.41% from two or more races. Hispanic or Latino of any race were 1.51% of the population.

There were 1,778 households, out of which 25.9% had children under the age of 18 living with them, 37.1% were married couples living together, 12.7% had a female householder with no husband present, and 45.4% were non-families. 39.3% of all households were made up of individuals, and 16.7% had someone living alone who was 65 years of age or older. The average household size was 2.16 and the average family size was 2.89.

In the CDP the population was spread out, with 22.4% under the age of 18, 6.6% from 18 to 24, 30.6% from 25 to 44, 21.2% from 45 to 64, and 19.2% who were 65 years of age or older. The median age was 39 years. For every 100 females, there were 92.6 males. For every 100 females age 18 and over, there were 85.5 males.

The median income for a household in the CDP was $35,199, and the median income for a family was $43,958. Males had a median income of $31,956 versus $26,309 for females. The per capita income for the CDP was $17,806. About 9.0% of families and 10.6% of the population were below the poverty line, including 12.6% of those under age 18 and 12.7% of those age 65 or over.
