= Frank Barnes (left-handed pitcher) =

American baseball player (1900–1967)

- Pitcher
- Born: January 9, 1900; Dallas, Texas
- Died: September 27, 1967 (aged 67); Houston, Texas
- Batted: Left Threw: Left

MLB debut
- April 18, 1929, for the Detroit Tigers

Last MLB appearance
- September 26, 1930, for the New York Yankees

MLB statistics
- Win–loss record: 0–2
- Earned run average: 7.79
- Strikeouts: 2
- Stats at Baseball Reference

Teams
- Detroit Tigers (1929); New York Yankees (1930)

Frank Samuel "Lefty" Barnes (January 9, 1900 – September 27, 1967) was a Major League Baseball (MLB) pitcher. Barnes played for the Detroit Tigers in 1929 and the New York Yankees in 1930. In six career games, he had a 0–2 record, with a 7.79 earned run average.
