= USS Hampden County =

1944 LST-542-class tank landing ship

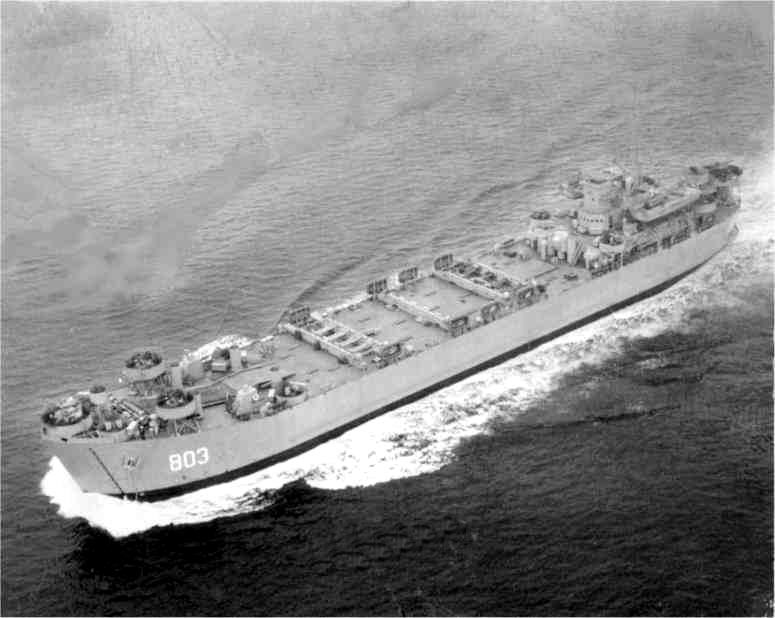
- USS Hampden County (LST-803) underway

History

United States
- Name: USS LST-803
- Builder: Jeffersonville Boat & Machine Company; Jeffersonville, Indiana
- Laid down: 2 September 1944
- Launched: 19 October 1944
- Sponsored by: Mrs. Katie Bryant
- Commissioned: 13 November 1944
- Decommissioned: 15 June 1949
- Recommissioned: 15 November 1950
- Renamed: USS Hampden County (LST-803), 1 July 1955
- Decommissioned: 2 January 1958
- Stricken: 17 April 1958
- Fate: Sunk as target, 26 September 1958

General characteristics
- Class & type: LST-542-class tank landing ship
- Displacement: 1,625 tons (light); 4,080 tons (full)
- Length: 328 ft (100.0 m)
- Beam: 50 ft (15.2 m)
- Draft: Bow 2'-4", stern 7'-6" (unloaded); bow 8'-2", stern 14'-1" (unloaded)
- Depth: 8 ft (2.4 m) fwd; 14 ft 4 in (4.37 m)aft (full load)
- Propulsion: Two General Motors 12-567 diesel engines, two shafts, twin rudders
- Speed: 12 knots
- Boats & landing craft carried: Two LCVPs
- Capacity: 16 officers, 147 enlisted men
- Complement: 7 officers, 104 enlisted men
- Armament: Eight 40 mm guns, twelve 20 mm guns

The USS Hampden County (LST-803) was an LST-542-class tank landing ship built for the United States Navy during World War II. Named after Hampden County, Massachusetts, she was the only U.S. Naval vessel to bear the name.

Originally laid down as LST-803 by the Jeffersonville Boat & Machine Company of Jeffersonville, Indiana, on 14 September 1944; launched 23 October; sponsored by Mrs. Katie Bryant; and commissioned 17 November. After shakedown off Florida LST-803 departed New Orleans in December, arriving San Diego 8 January 1945. Sailing 4 days later, she touched Pearl Harbor and Eniwetok before arriving Guam 12 February. During the next month she prepared at Guam, Saipan, and Tinian for the invasion of Okinawa. With the 16th Antiaircraft Artillery Battalion of the United States Marine Corps on board, she sailed 26 March for the last barrier on the road to Saipan. The landing ship approached Kerama Retto 2 April, then under heavy enemy air raids and suicide attacks for the next week she unloaded her cargo before proceeding to Saipan for reinforcements. For the rest of the War LST-803 shuttled cargo between Okinawa and the Philippines, then after the official Japanese surrender arrived Tokyo Bay with cargo for the occupation forces. Following 3 months duty in the Far East LST-803 sailed for the United States in mid-November, arriving San Diego the following month. In July, 1946 she returned to the Western Pacific to operate as a utility ship, and transported cargo, troops, and prisoners-of-war throughout the Mariana and Caroline Islands. She continued these operations until 26 February 1949 when she departed Kwajalein for the United States. Arriving Long Beach 10 April, LST-803 decommissioned 15 June and joined the Pacific Reserve Fleet.

Following the external communist aggression in South Korea LST-803 recommissioned on 15 November 1950 to meet the demand for ships needed in the struggle. She departed Port Hueneme 3 March 1951 and arrived Yokosuka 26 April. On 17 May she sailed to Korea to transport prisoners-of-war between Pusan and Koje-Do. Throughout the rest of the year she operated between Japan and Inchon, Korea, transporting troops, cargo, and prisoners-of-war then sailed 31 January 1952, for San Diego. After a brief overhaul and training, the veteran landing ship was back in Japan 15 November. She resumed her cargo and transport runs from Japan to Inchon and Pusan, continuing these operations until the Armistice ended the armed conflict 27 July 1953. Her major projects were amphibious landings at Inchon and salvage work behind enemy lines at Chummum Do.

After the War she engaged in "Operation Big Switch," the return of North Korean and Chinese Communists to Incheon for the exchange of South Korean repatriates. Returning to San Diego 25 September she operated along the West Coast for the rest of the year. In May, 1954 she sailed on her third Far East tour and, while there, was assigned to "Operation Passage to Freedom" which transported French and Vietnamese Army units, and Christian refugees from North Vietnam to Saigon. While still in the Far East early in 1955, another impending crisis flared between the Communist Chinese and the Chinese Nationalists over the Tachen Islands. As part of the amphibious force of the 7th Fleet, LST-803 commenced embarking personnel and supplies from the Tachen beaches on 8 February. During the next week she transported over 2,300 troops and civilians, along with vehicles and heavy weapons to Formosa. After these two operations contributing to peace in Asia were completed LST-803 sailed for the United States, arriving San Diego 28 April.

On 1 July 1955 LST-803 was named USS Hampden County (LST-803). For the next 2 years she engaged in amphibious exercises along the West Coast, Hawaii, and in the Far East. After her 1956-1957 WestPac tour, she returned to the West Coast 31 August, then decommissioned at Mare Island 2 January 1958. She was struck from the Naval Vessel Register 17 April and was sunk as a fleet practice target off the coast of California 26 September 1958.

LST-803 received one battle star for World War II service and five stars for the Korean War.
