= Roy Sherid =

American baseball player

- Pitcher
- Born: January 25, 1907; Norristown, Pennsylvania, U.S.
- Died: February 28, 1982 (aged 75); Parker Ford, Pennsylvania, U.S.
- Batted: Right Threw: Right

MLB debut
- May 11, 1929, for the New York Yankees

Last MLB appearance
- June 21, 1931, for the New York Yankees

MLB statistics
- Win–loss record: 23–24
- Earned run average: 4.71
- Strikeouts: 149
- Stats at Baseball Reference

Teams
- New York Yankees (1929–1931)

Royden Richard Sherid (January 25, 1907 – February 28, 1982) was an American professional baseball pitcher who appeared in 87 games over three seasons in the Major Leagues (1929–1931) for the New York Yankees. Born in Norristown, Pennsylvania, he threw and batted right-handed, stood 6 feet 2 inches (1.88 m) tall and weighed 185 pounds (84 kg).

Sherid attended two Pennsylvania colleges, Widener University in Chester and Albright College in Reading. His first pro season, 1929, was spent on the roster of the defending World Series champion Yankees. Appearing in 33 games, with 15 starts, he split 12 decisions, earned one save, threw nine complete games, and posted a 3.61 earned run average. But the Yankees finished a distant second in the American League, 18 lengths behind the eventual world champion Philadelphia Athletics. In 1930, Sherid increased his workload to 37 games and 184 innings pitched, doubled his win total with 12 triumphs, had three saves in relief, and fired eight more complete games. But he lost 13 games, and saw his ERA jump to 5.23. His Yankees had another disappointing campaign, dropping to third place and finishing 16 games behind the Athletics, who won their second straight World Series. The following season, in Sherid's second appearance of 1931, as a starter against the second-division Boston Red Sox, he threw a 15-inning complete game, only to lose 5–4. By June 21, he had evened his won–lost record at 5–5 in 17 games, but his effectiveness had continued to deteriorate: his ERA remained poor at 5.69.

He was sent to the International League in an attempt to regain his form, but he never returned to the majors, retiring in 1932 after four professional seasons.

In his 87 big-league appearances, Sherid posted a career 23–24 record with a 4.71 ERA, with 20 complete games among his 44 games started; he was credited with six career saves and 28 games finished as a reliever. In 413 innings pitched, he allowed 473 hits and 166 bases on balls, and recorded 149 strikeouts.

Roy Sherid died age 75 in Parker Ford, Pennsylvania, on February 28, 1982.
