= Suzanne Strempek Shea =

Suzanne Strempek Shea (born in western Massachusetts, USA), is the author of literary fiction, biographies and memoirs. She was the winner of the 2000 New England Book Award for Fiction. Shea lives in Bondsville, Massachusetts, with her husband, long-time Springfield Republican reporter and then columnist Tom Shea.

She is the author of five novels: Selling the Lite of Heaven, Hoopi Shoopi Donna, Lily of the Valley, Around Again, and Becoming Finola, published by Washington Square Press. She has also written three memoirs, Songs From a Lead-lined Room: Notes - High and Low - From My Journey Through Breast Cancer and Radiation; Shelf Life: Romance, Mystery, Drama and Other Page-Turning Adventures From a Year in a Bookstore; and Sundays in America: A Yearlong Road Trip in Search of Christian Faith, all published by Beacon Press.

Her freelance journalism and fiction has appeared in magazines and newspapers including Yankee, The Bark, Golf World, The Boston Globe, The Philadelphia Inquirer, Organic Style, and ESPN the Magazine. She was a regular contributor to Obit magazine. Her essay "Crafty Critters" appears in the anthology Knitting Yarns: Writers on Knitting, published by W. W. Norton & Company in 2013.

== Selected works ==
Novels

- Selling the Lite of Heaven
- Hoopi Shoopi Donna
- Lily of the Valley
- Around Again

Memoirs

- Songs from a Lead-Lined Room: Notes—High and Low—From My Journey Through Breast Cancer and Radiation
- Shelf Life: Romance, Mystery, Drama, and Other Page-Turning Adventures from a Year in a Bookstore

Other Work

- "Crafty Critters" in Knitting Yarns: Writers on Knitting.
