= Three Rivers, Massachusetts =

- Former CDP
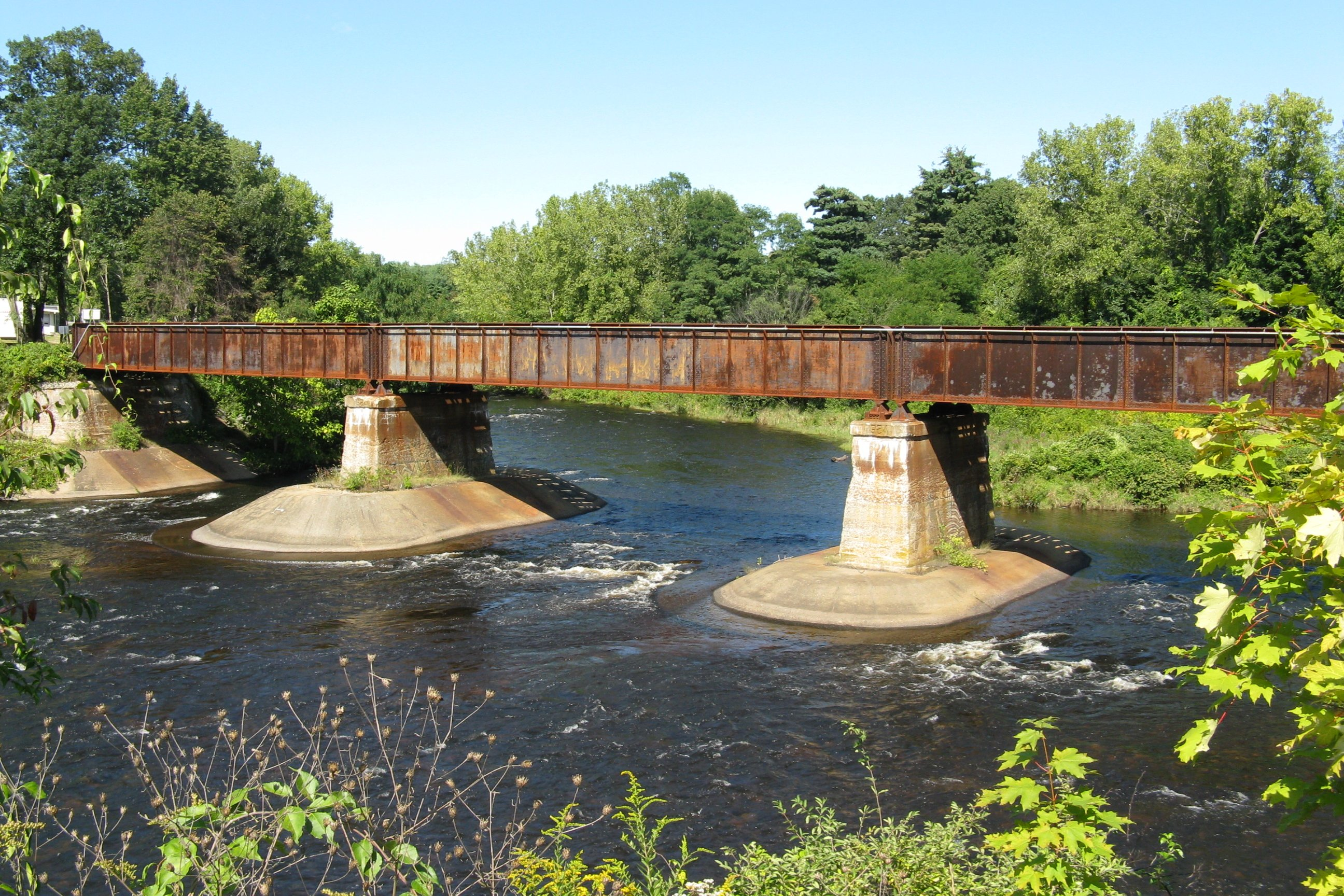
- Confluence of Ware and Quaboag rivers forming the Chicopee River
- Nickname: "The Polka Capital of New England" "The Longmeadow of Palmer"
- Interactive map of Three Rivers, Massachusetts
- Coordinates: 42°10′45″N 72°21′50″W
- Country: United States
- State: Massachusetts
- County: Hampden
- City: Palmer

Area
  - Total: 3.4 sq mi (8.8 km^{2})
  - Land: 3.2 sq mi (8.3 km^{2})
  - Water: 0.19 sq mi (0.5 km^{2})
- Elevation: 325 ft (99 m)

Population (2000)
  - Total: 2,939
  - Density: 918/sq mi (354.6/km^{2})
- Time zone: UTC-5 (Eastern (EST))
  - Summer (DST): UTC-4 (EDT)
- ZIP code: 01080
- Area code: 413
- FIPS code: 25-69730
- GNIS feature ID: 0609613

Three Rivers is a village and former census-designated place (CDP) in the city of Palmer in Hampden County, Massachusetts, United States. It is part of the Springfield, Massachusetts Metropolitan Statistical Area. It is named for the confluence of the Ware and Quaboag rivers, which form the Chicopee River.

== Geography ==
Three Rivers is located at 42°10′45″N 72°21′50″W (42.179053, -72.363807).

According to the United States Census Bureau, the CDP had a total area of 8.8 km^{2} (3.4 sq mi), of which 8.3 km^{2} (3.2 sq mi) is land and 0.5 km^{2} (0.19 sq mi) (5.60%) is water.

== Demographics ==
As of the census of 2000, there were 2,939 people, 1,203 households, and 795 families residing in the CDP. The population density was 354.6 people /km^{2} (918 people/mi^{2}). There were 1,309 housing units at an average density of 157.9 units /km^{2} (409 units/mi^{2}). The racial makeup of the CDP was 97.41% White, 0.34% African American, 0.34% Native American, 0.14% Asian, 0.44% from other races, and 1.33% from two or more races. Hispanic or Latino of any race were 1.05% of the population.

There were 1,203 households, out of which 31.4% had children under the age of 18 living with them, 46.4% were married couples living together, 14.5% had a female householder with no husband present, and 33.9% were non-families. 28.4% of all households were made up of individuals, and 14.0% had someone living alone who was 65 years of age or older. The average household size was 2.44 and the average family size was 2.97.

In the CDP the population was spread out, with 24.9% under the age of 18, 7.7% from 18 to 24, 31.0% from 25 to 44, 19.2% from 45 to 64, and 17.1% who were 65 years of age or older. The median age was 37 years. For every 100 females, there were 88.3 males. For every 100 females age 18 and over, there were 86.5 males.

The median income for a household in the CDP was $37,528, and the median income for a family was $40,000. Males had a median income of $31,582 versus $22,533 for females. The per capita income for the CDP was $16,810. About 7.7% of families and 8.9% of the population were below the poverty line, including 15.0% of those under age 18 and 5.8% of those age 65 or over.

Three Rivers, MA (01080) is known as "The Polka Capital of New England", featuring some of the region's top polka bands at the well-known Pulaski Park. Many Polish immigrants came to Three Rivers in the late 19th century and early 20th century, and their culture of food and music carries through today. Polish traditions are also continued at Three Rivers' Catholic parish, Divine Mercy Parish.

== See also ==
- List of mill towns in Massachusetts
