= Chester-Blandford State Forest =

Protected area in Massachusetts, United States

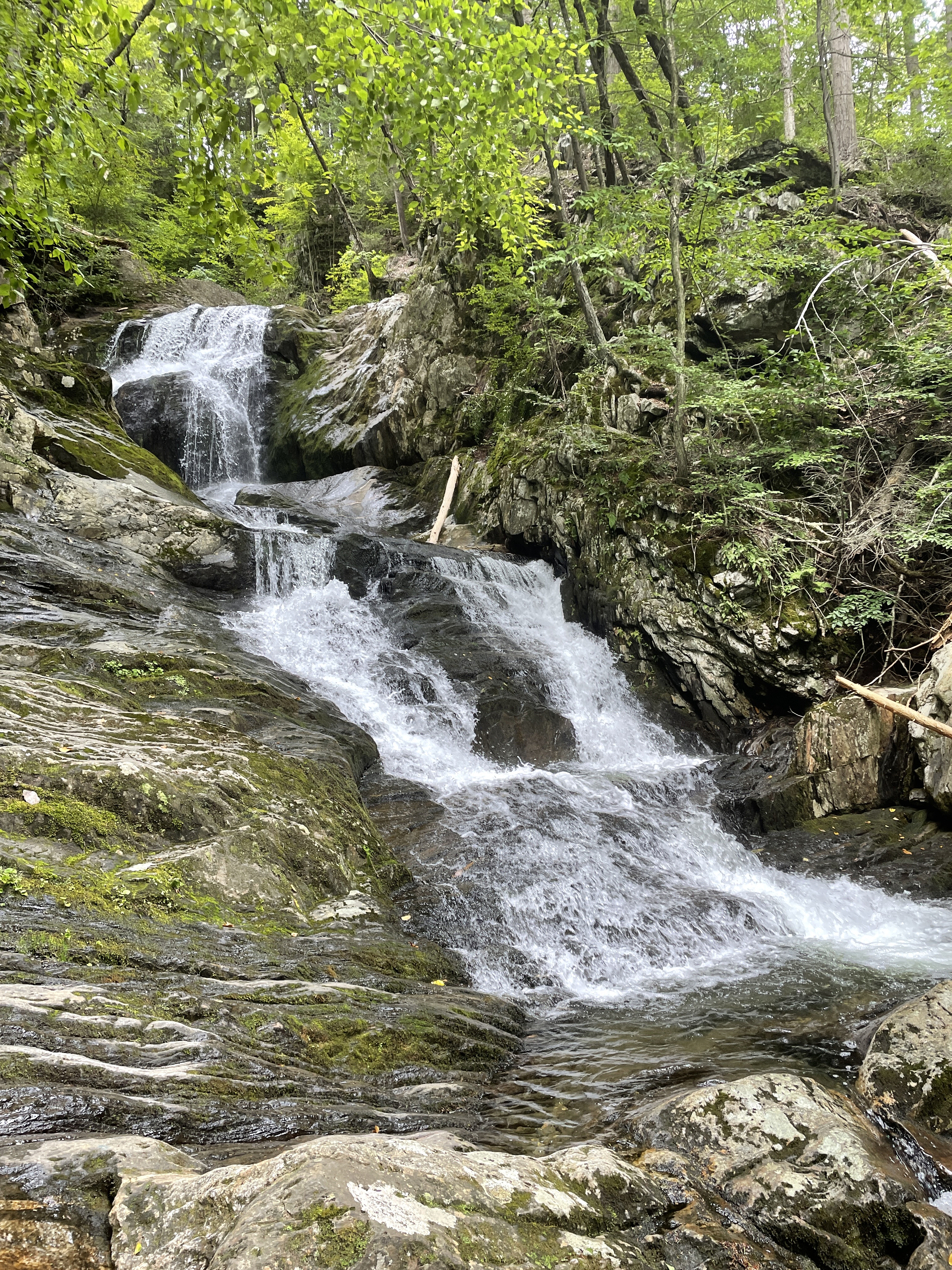
- Sanderson Brook Falls

- Location within Massachusetts Location within the United States
- Location: Chester and Blandford, Massachusetts, United States
- Coordinates: 42°14′48″N 72°57′23″W
- Area: 2,776 acres (1,123 ha)
- Elevation: 702 ft (214 m)
- Established: 1924
- Administrator: Massachusetts Department of Conservation and Recreation
- Website: Official website

Chester-Blandford State Forest is a publicly owned forest with recreational features located in the two towns for which it is named, Chester and Blandford, Massachusetts. The state forest includes remnants of small mining operations and the 60-foot cascade at Sanderson Brook Falls. It is managed by the Department of Conservation and Recreation.

== History ==
The state forest was established in 1924 when local lumber companies sold land to the state. The Civilian Conservation Corps was active in the forest from 1934 to 1940. Their work included the construction of a campground, pavilions, trails, ski runs, and the road and bridges that lead to Sanderson Brook Falls.

== Activities and amenities ==
Forest trails are used for hiking, horseback riding, mountain biking, and cross-country skiing. Picnicking, fishing, restricted hunting, and snowmobiling are also available.
