= Boston Road, Springfield, Massachusetts =

Neighborhood in Springfield, Massachusetts, United States

Boston Road
- Neighborhood
- Interactive map of Boston Road
- Coordinates: 42°08′19.6″N 72°30′35.8″W
- Country: United States
- State: Massachusetts
- City: Springfield
- Time zone: UTC−5 (EST)
  - Summer (DST): UTC−4 (EDT)

Boston Road is Springfield, Massachusetts's principal commercial and retail corridor, located on the eastern edge of the city. The Boston Road neighborhood, historically known as Springfield Plain, is named for being a major waypoint on the Boston Post Road system.

== Neighborhood ==
Boston Road remains a commercial stronghold, home to Springfield Crossing, Haymarket Square and various big-box stores.

Springfield city parks, including Five Mile Pond and Loon Pond, provide places to swim, fish, boat, and picnic. The High School of Science & Technology and the controversially renovated Putnam Vocational High School are located in this neighborhood.

The neighborhood also features numerous local and chain restaurants and a handful of independently owned restaurants and bars.

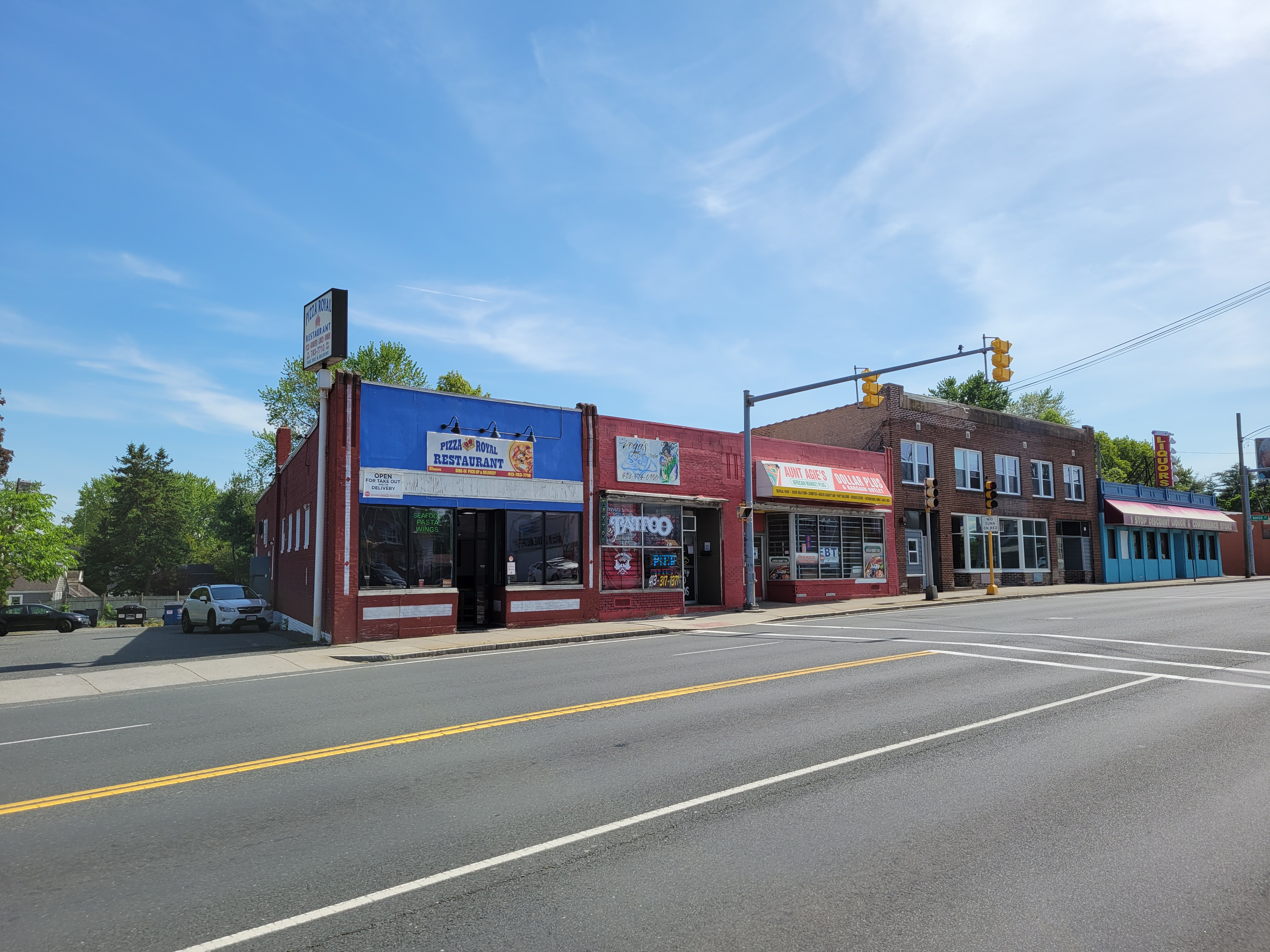
Site of first Friendly's Restaurant on Boston Road - now the Pizza Royal Restaurant

== History ==
The area was sparsely settled until the 1890s.

The first Friendly's Restaurant opened on Boston Road.
