= Bill Henderson (pitcher) =

American baseball player (1901-1966)

- Pitcher
- Born: November 4, 1901; Blountstown, Florida, U.S.
- Died: October 6, 1966 (aged 64); Pensacola, Florida, U.S.
- Batted: Right Threw: Right

MLB debut
- June 20, 1930, for the New York Yankees

Last MLB appearance
- July 4, 1930, for the New York Yankees

MLB statistics
- Win–loss record: 0-0
- Earned run average: 4.50
- Strikeouts: 2
- Stats at Baseball Reference

Teams
- New York Yankees (1930)

William Maxwell Henderson (November 4, 1901 – October 6, 1966) was an American professional baseball pitcher. "Wild Bill" played part of one season in Major League Baseball for the New York Yankees in 1930. In 3 career games, he had a 0–0 record, with a 4.50 ERA. He batted and threw right-handed.

Henderson's minor league baseball career spanned fifteen seasons, from 1923 until 1937. Henderson lived in Ferry Pass, Florida until his death at a hospital in Pensacola on October 6, 1966.
