= Hampden Agricultural Society =

The Hampden Agricultural Society was first proposed on December 24, 1817, in Northampton, Massachusetts. Following the publication of a notice the Hampshire, Franklin & Hampden Agricultural Society was formed on January 28, 1828.

== Scientific lectures ==
The Society hosted a number of scientific meetings at Northampton and often published an account of the lectures.

- 1827 Edward Hitchcock the professor of chemistry at Amherst College on October 24
- 1829 Festus Foster on October 29
- 1830 Samuel Clesson Allen, the politician formerly representing Massachusetts in the House of Representatives on October 27
- 1831 Samuel Fowler Dickinson October 27
