= Bondsville, Massachusetts =

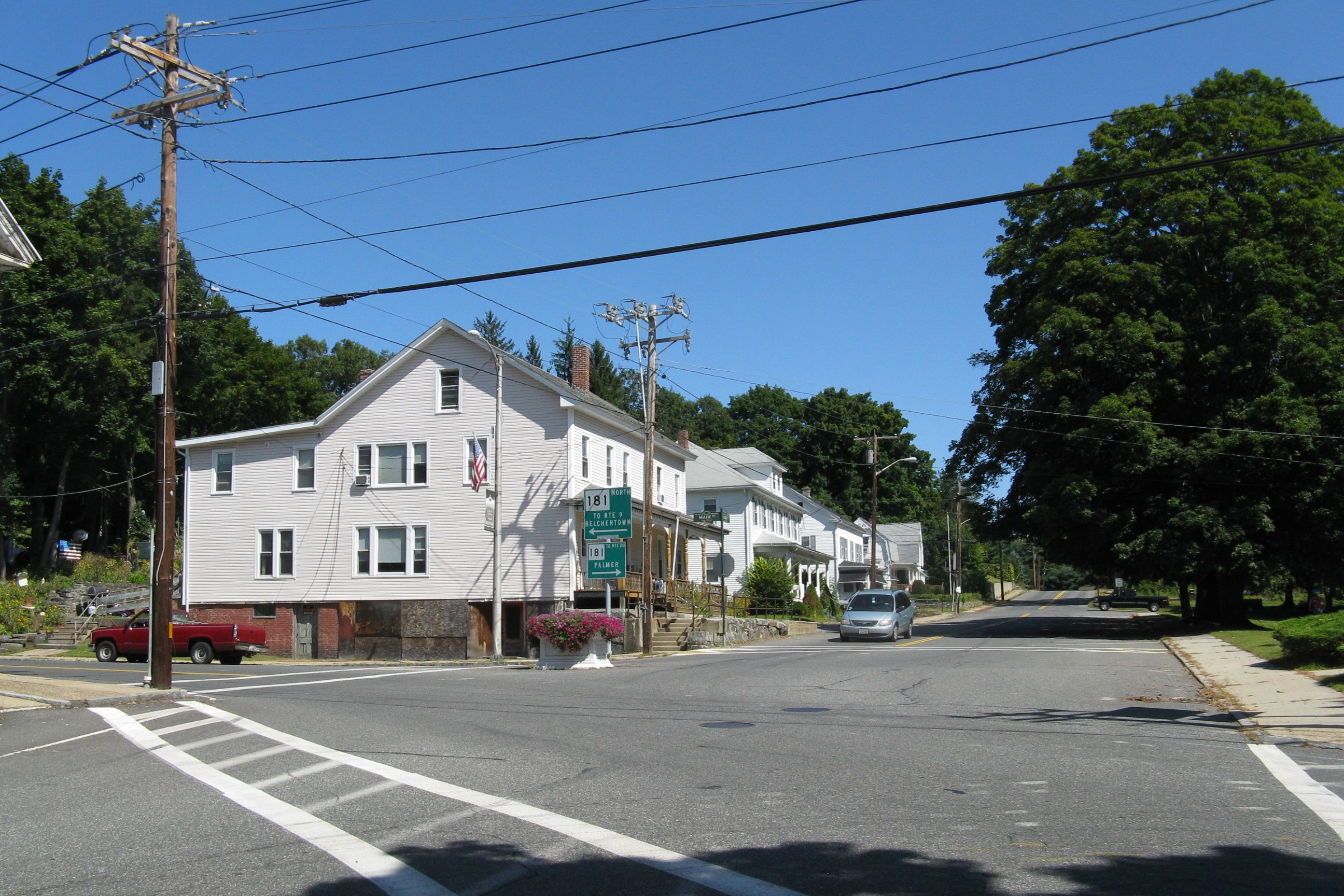
Corner of State and Main, Bondsville MA

Bondsville is an area and former census-designated place (CDP) located in the town of Palmer in Hampden County in the western part of the U.S. state of Massachusetts. The population of the CDP was 1,876 at the 2000 census. It is part of the Springfield, Massachusetts Metropolitan Statistical Area. The village was named after Emelius Bond who first secured the water rights of the Swift River in 1846 to form the Bond Village Manufacturing Company.

== History ==
Born in 1800 in Brimfield, Massachusetts, Emelius Bond arrived in what would become Bondsville in 1830 and started a mill that utilized the water power of the Swift River. The Bond Village Manufacturing Company was later granted the legal rights to the waters of the Swift River in 1846. Later, the company would be purchased and become known as the Boston Duck Company which produced fabrics and specialized in fabric for raincoats. The Boston Duck Company closed its doors in 1941 where the building and many of its mill houses were auctioned off. In October 1968, the entire complex which stood over much of Main Street, was destroyed in a multi-day massive fire.

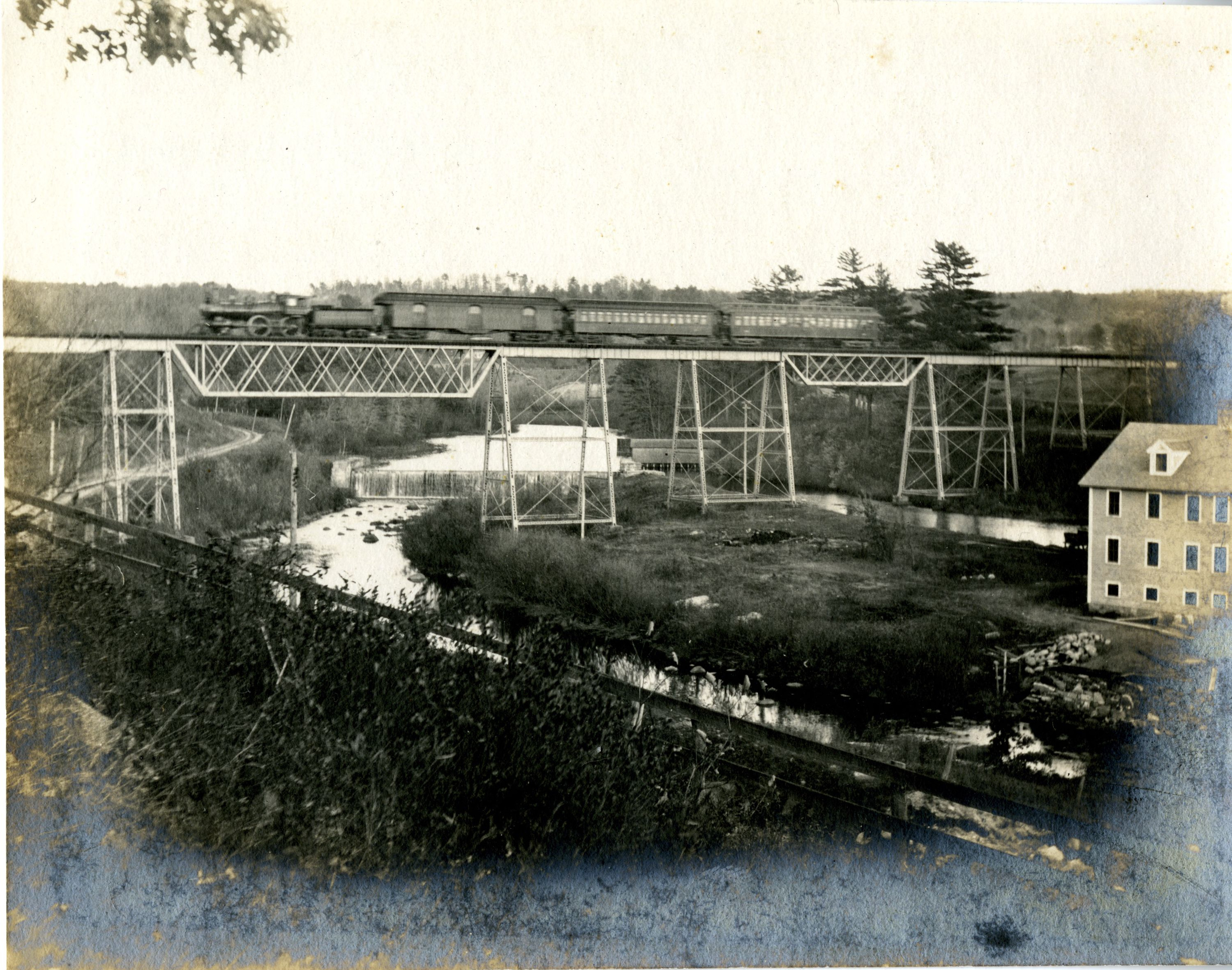
The rear of the Boston Duck Company and the Boston and Maine Railroad headed north over the Swift River.

Overlooking Main Street is the former St. Bartholomew Roman Catholic church which was closed by Bishop Timothy A. McDonnell on Christmas Eve of 2009. The church had been constructed between 1878 and 1879, with the first Mass being said in the completed church proper on Christmas Day of 1879. The church's first permanent pastor was Rev. Bartholomew L. McKeany who served from 1879 until his death in 1910.

Two railroads served the village. The Boston and Maine Railroad had a station on Maple Street behind the former Bleach and Dye Works building. This station was located just south of the Swift River before a large train overpass. The station has been tended to by stationmaster George Girouard, who was later awarded a golden ticket on the railroad for his years of service. The second railroad was the Boston and Albany Railroad which had both a passenger and freight station which actually stood in the town of Belchertown, Massachusetts between Keyes Street and the Swift River. This line would be discontinued at the creation of the Quabbin Reservoir as the next stop was in Enfield, Massachusetts which is now under the waters of the reservoir.

== Geography ==
Bondsville is located at 42°13′N 72°21′W (42.2089, -72.3439).

According to the United States Census Bureau, the CDP has a total area of 9.6 km^{2} (3.7 mi^{2}), of which 9.5 km^{2} (3.7 mi^{2}) is land and 0.1 km^{2} (0.1 mi^{2}) (1.35%) is water. The ZIP Code for Bondsville is 01009.

== Demographics ==
At the 2000 census there were 1,876 people, 734 households, and 515 families in the CDP. The population density was 197.9/km^{2} (512.1/mi^{2}). There were 787 housing units at an average density of 83.0/km^{2} (214.8/mi^{2}). The racial makeup of the CDP was 98.03% White, 0.21% African American, 0.21% Native American, 0.48% from other races, and 1.07% from two or more races. Hispanic or Latino of any race were 1.07%.

Of the 734 households 35.1% had children under the age of 18 living with them, 50.0% were married couples living together, 14.4% had a female householder with no husband present, and 29.8% were non-families. 24.7% of households were one person and 12.7% were one person aged 65 or older. The average household size was 2.56 and the average family size was 3.05.

The age distribution was 26.9% under the age of 18, 7.1% from 18 to 24, 27.8% from 25 to 44, 23.8% from 45 to 64, and 14.5% 65 or older. The median age was 38 years. For every 100 females, there were 94.8 males. For every 100 females age 18 and over, there were 87.9 males.

The median household income was $45,875 and the median family income was $54,125. Males had a median income of $40,490 versus $29,856 for females. The per capita income for the CDP was $20,097. About 3.2% of families and 6.9% of the population were below the poverty line, including 9.9% of those under age 18 and 11.7% of those age 65 or over.

== See also ==
- List of mill towns in Massachusetts
