= Palmer, Massachusetts =

- City
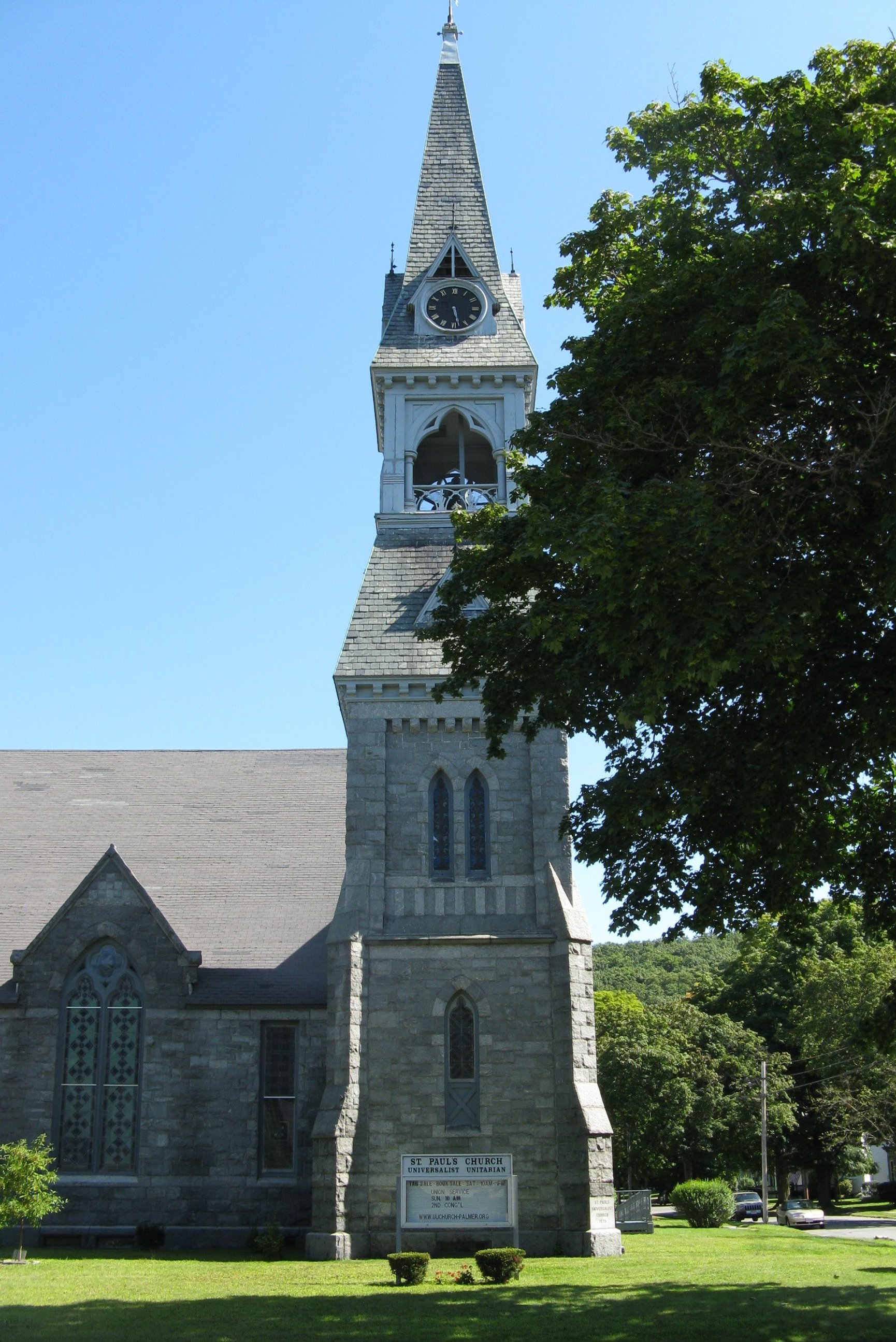
- St. Paul's Church

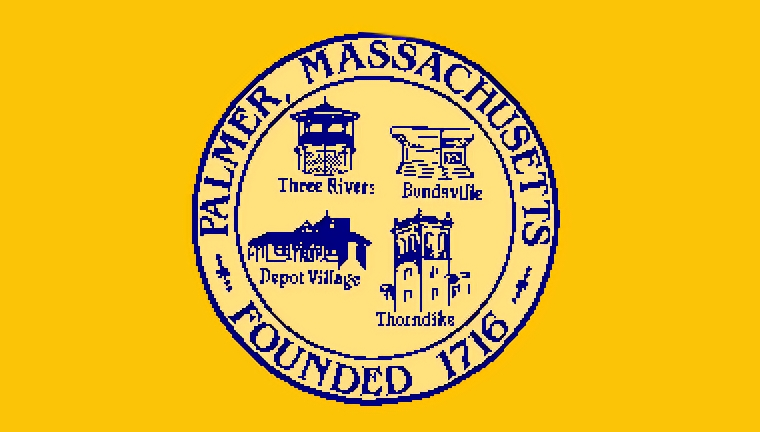
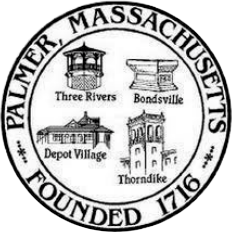
- Flag Seal
- Nickname: "Town of Seven Railroads"
- Location in Hampden County in Massachusetts

- Location in the United States
- Coordinates: 42°09′30″N 72°19′45″W
- Country: United States
- State: Massachusetts
- County: Hampden
- Settled: 1727
- Incorporated: August 23, 1775

Government
  - Type: Council-manager
  - Councilors-at-large: Barbara Barry (District Councilor), Council President, At Large Councilors Mark Caci, Christopher Pelletier Jessica Sizer; District Councilors; Philip Hebert, Matthew Lemieux, Karl Williams
  - Town Manager: Brad Brothers

Area
  - Total: 32.00 sq mi (82.88 km^{2})
  - Land: 31.58 sq mi (81.78 km^{2})
  - Water: 0.42 sq mi (1.09 km^{2})
- Elevation: 331 ft (101 m)

Population (2020)
  - Total: 12,448
  - Density: 394.2/sq mi (152.21/km^{2})
- Time zone: UTC-5 (Eastern)
  - Summer (DST): UTC-4 (Eastern)
- ZIP Codes: 01069 (Palmer); 01009 (Bondsville); 01079 (Thorndike); 01080 (Three Rivers)
- Area code: 413
- FIPS code: 25-52144
- GNIS feature ID: 0619387
- Website: townofpalmer.com

Palmer is a city in Hampden County, Massachusetts, United States. With a population of 12,448 at the 2020 census, Palmer is the least populous city in the Commonwealth. (Note: The least populous municipality in Massachusetts is Gosnold, with a population of 70 residents as of the 2020 Census.) It is part of the Springfield, Massachusetts Metropolitan Statistical Area. Palmer adopted a home rule charter in 2004 with a council-manager form of government. Palmer is one of thirteen Massachusetts municipalities that have city forms of government but retain "The town of" in their official names.

The villages of Bondsville, Thorndike, Depot Village, and Three Rivers are located in Palmer.

== History ==
Palmer is composed of four separate and distinct villages: Depot Village, typically referred to simply as "Palmer" (named for the ornate Union Station railroad terminal designed by architect Henry Hobson Richardson), Thorndike, Three Rivers, and Bondsville. The villages began to develop their distinctive characters in the 18th century, and by the 19th century two rail lines and a trolley line opened the town to population growth. Today, each village has its own post office, and all but Thorndike have their own fire station.

Palmer was originally a part of Brimfield but separated after being too far from Brimfield. Palmer's first settler was John King. He was born in Edwardstone, Suffolk, England, and built his home in 1716 on the banks of the Quaboag River. The area as then known was called "The Elbow Tract". In 1731, a deed to land in today's Palmer renamed the town 'New Marlborough' after Marlborough, Massachusetts, in today's Middlesex County. In 1731, residents of the borough renamed the town 'Kingsfield', after the aforementioned John King. Though in some papers in the Massachusetts General Court, it was referred to as the Elbow. A large group of Scots-Irish Presbyterians followed, arriving in 1727. Finally in 1752, it was named Palmer after John Palmer, a Chief Justice of the Superior Court of the Dominion of New England. In 1775, Massachusetts officially incorporated Palmer.

Depot Village became Palmer's main commercial and business center during the late 19th century and remains so today. Palmer's industry developed in Bondsville. During the 18th century, saw and grist mills were established by the rivers, and by 1825 Palmer woolen mills began to produce textiles. The Blanchard Scythe Factory, Wright Wire Woolen Mills, and the Holden-Fuller Woolen Mills developed major industrial capacity, and constructed large amounts of workers' housing. By 1900, Boston Duck (which made heavy cotton fabric) had over 500 employees in the town. The 20th century brought about a shift of immigrants in Palmer from those of French and Scottish origin to those of primarily Polish and French-Canadian extraction.

== Geography ==
According to the United States Census Bureau, Palmer has a total area of 32.0 square miles (82.9 km^{2}), of which 31.5 square miles (81.7 km^{2}) are land and 0.5 square mile (1.3 km^{2}) (1.53%) is water. The city is bordered by Ludlow and Wilbraham on the southwest, Belchertown on the northwest, Ware on the northeast, Warren on the east, Brimfield on the southeast, and Monson on the south.

== Demographics ==
Historical population
Year	Pop.	±%
1790	809	—
1850	3,974	+391.2%
1860	4,082	+2.7%
1870	3,631	−11.0%
1880	5,504	+51.6%
1890	7,520	+36.6%
1900	7,801	+3.7%
1910	8,610	+10.4%
1920	9,896	+14.9%
1930	9,677	−2.2%
1940	9,149	−5.5%
1950	9,533	+4.2%
1960	10,358	+8.7%
1970	11,680	+12.8%
1980	11,389	−2.5%
1990	12,054	+5.8%
2000	12,497	+3.7%
2010	12,140	−2.9%
2020	12,448	+2.5%
2022*	12,337	−0.9%
* = population estimate. Source: United States census records and Population Estimates Program data. Source: U.S. Decennial Census

As of the census of 2000, there were 12,497 people, 5,078 households, and 3,331 families residing in the town. The population density was 396.3 inhabitants per square mile (153.0/km^{2}). There were 5,402 housing units at an average density of 171.3 per square mile (66.1/km^{2}). The racial makeup of the town was 96.82% White, 0.75% Black or African American, 0.23% Native American, 0.56% Asian, 0.44% from other races, and 1.19% from two or more races. Hispanic or Latino of any race were 1.23% of the population.

There were 5,078 households, out of which 31.6% had children under the age of 18 living with them, 48.5% were married couples living together, 12.3% had a female householder with no husband present, and 34.4% were non-families. 28.7% of all households were made up of individuals, and 13.0% had someone living alone who was 65 years of age or older. The average household size was 2.45 and the average family size was 3.01.

In the town the population was spread out, with 25.2% under the age of 18, 6.8% from 18 to 24, 30.5% from 25 to 44, 22.0% from 45 to 64, and 15.5% who were 65 years of age or older. The median age was 38 years. For every 100 females, there were 93.5 males. For every 100 females age 18 and over, there were 88.9 males.

The median income for a household in the town was $41,443, and the median income for a family was $49,358. Males had a median income of $35,748 versus $26,256 for females. The per capita income for the town was $18,664. About 5.8% of families and 7.9% of the population were below the poverty line, including 10.3% of those under age 18 and 9.8% of those age 65 or over.

== Economy ==
=== Race Track ===
The New England Region of the Sports Car Club of America has reached an agreement with the Town of Palmer to construct a new road course near their town. Palmer Motorsports Park will operate along a similar vein as Buttonwillow Raceway Park in California, in that it will be owned and operated by a limited liability corporation formed by New England Region. This effort is to ensure that NER would have its own "flagship" racetrack, as the two tracks it currently uses—New Hampshire Motor Speedway and Lime Rock Park in Connecticut—are heavily used by NASCAR.

Palmer Motor Sports Park opened for racing in May 2015. It is a 2.3 mile road course with over 190 feet in elevation change. Road & Track magazine named Palmer Motorsports Park one of the top 10 racetracks to drive in North America.

==== Business advocacy ====
The Quaboag Hills Chamber of Commerce is headquartered in Palmer and is the advocate for business and community development in the Quaboag Valley area by providing the 200+ members with a voice in political, social and economic issues.

== Education ==
The Town of Palmer is served by three schools. Old Mill Pond Elementary School serves grades K through 5 and Palmer High School serves grades 6 through 12. Pathfinder Regional Vocational Technical High School is also located in Palmer, and serves grades 9 through 12. Camp Ramah in New England is located in Palmer.

== Infrastructure ==
=== Transportation ===
==== Public transit ====
Palmer is served by the Pioneer Valley Transit Authority (PVTA) with two routes, the Palmer Shuttle and the Ware Shuttle. The Palmer Shuttle connects Palmer Big Y, Palmer Center, Wing Hospital, and the villages of Thorndike, Three Rivers, and Bondsville. Select trips run directly from Palmer Big Y to Springfield Union Station. The Ware Shuttle connects the Church Street Senior Center and Valley View to Ware Center, Ware Walmart, Palmer Center, Palmer Big Y, and Wilbraham Big Y; in Wilbraham, riders can transfer to other PVTA routes into Springfield. Both routes operate seven days per week.

==== Railroads ====
Palmer has been called the "Town of Seven Railroads". These included five operating railroads (Boston & Albany, Central Vermont, Springfield, Athol & North-eastern, Ware River, and Central Massachusetts), one which was built but never operated (Hampden), and one which was not completed (Southern New England) The B&A, CV, and Ware River served Union Station, which was designed by H. H. Richardson.

The Central Vermont was sold to RailTex in 1995 and operated as the New England Central Railroad. RailTex was merged into RailAmerica in 2000, which in turn was acquired by the Genesee & Wyoming company in 2012. The B&A is now the CSX Boston Subdivision, while parts of the otherwise defunct Ware River and Central Massachusetts are operated by the Massachusetts Central Railroad. The SA&N was abandoned in the 1930s when the Quabbin Reservoir was built.

Amtrak's Lake Shore Limited passes through Palmer, as did the Montrealer from 1989 to 1995 and the Vermonter from 1995 to 2014, but no trains have stopped at Palmer since 1971. Union Station is privately owned and houses a restaurant.

On January 17, 2024 MassDOT announced that a consultant has been selected to progress planning and design work for the new train station as part of the West-East Rail project.

==== Road ====
I-90 (Mass. Turnpike) currently has one exit in Palmer nearby the center of the city. This exit leads to Massachusetts Route 32, which runs south to north from Monson to the center of the city then runs through the eastern side of the city until it enters Ware. U.S. Route 20 which runs east to west, coming from Brimfield (not including a short clip through Monson), it then enters the center of the city, intersecting MA 32 and MA 181. After this U.S. 20 heads west into Wilbraham. MA 181 starts at U.S. 20 in the city center, before heading north into Three Rivers and Bondsville. After that, MA 181 enters Belchertown. MA 67 starts nearby the Monson border on U.S. 20 and stays on the extreme east side of Palmer before it heads into Warren. MA 67 goes under I-90, but never intersects the highway.

=== Fire and water ===
Unlike many Massachusetts communities, The Town of Palmer does not have its own water department. Instead Palmer, Bondsville and Three Rivers each have their own water department and their own fire department. Each fire department has its own fire chief, as there is no town-wide chief. Thorndike does not have its own fire department or water department instead contracting out with Palmer. The Thorndike Fire Department was disbanded following World War II.

== Notable people ==
- Irving Calkins, sport shooter
- Henry King, U.S. Congressman
- Marie-Claire Kirkland, Canadian lawyer, judge, and politician
- Taj Mahal, musician
- Suzanne Strempek Shea, author
- Chad Stahelski, director
- Chuck Thompson, sportscaster for the Baltimore Orioles and Colts
- Bob Wilder, racing driver, competed in the SCCA National Sports Car Championships

== See also ==
- List of mill towns in Massachusetts
