= WHYN =

WHYN can refer to:

- WHYN (AM), a radio station at 560 AM located in Springfield, Massachusetts
- WHYN-FM, a radio station at 93.1 FM located in Springfield, Massachusetts
- WGGB-TV, a TV station which formerly carried the WHYN-TV call signs located in Springfield, Massachusetts
