= NFL television blackout policies =

The National Football League television blackout policies are the strictest among the four major professional sports leagues in North America.

The NFL maintained a blackout policy, from 1973 through 2014, that stated that a home game cannot be televised in the team's local market if 85% of the tickets are not sold out 72 hours before the starting time of the match. This made the NFL the only major professional sports league in the United States that requires teams to sell out tickets in order to broadcast a game on television locally. Nationally televised games in the other leagues often are blacked out on the national networks on which the game is airing in the local markets of the participating teams. Those games still can be seen on the local broadcast television station or regional sports network that normally holds their local/regional broadcast rights. The NFL's sellout requirement blackout (but not the pay-television blackout, governed by syndication exclusivity) policy has been suspended on a year-to-year basis since 2015.

The NFL also is the only league that imposes an anti-siphoning rule in all teams' local markets: the NFL sells syndication rights of each team's cable and streaming games to a local over-the-air station in each local market. The respective cable station must be blacked out when that team is playing the said game (alternate telecasts, such as Nickelodeon’s NFL broadcasts, are not required to be simulcast in the local markets), but streaming games are not subject to blackout if the local station is simulcasting.

== Getting around restrictions ==
The earliest NFL television blackout policy blacked out all broadcasts on radio and television of any games in the home city of origin and on any television stations located within 75 miles (121 km) of the team's home city, regardless of whether they were sold out, during those time periods when the teams were playing at home. Teams were also allowed to restrict home-market stations from broadcasting games in other markets during the times they were playing away games broadcast live in their home market. Even if they gave their approval for a telecast or broadcast they might otherwise have been able to permit, the NFL commissioner was still required to approve it, and did not need to give an explanation.

In the early 1950s, the U.S. Department of Justice brought an antitrust lawsuit against the league over these provisions. The NFL argued that the antitrust exemption for professional baseball and recently reaffirmed by the Supreme Court applied to it; Judge Allan Kuhn Grim of the Eastern District of Pennsylvania declined to reach that question, holding that since antitrust law clearly applied to radio and television it applied in the instant case as well, and granted an injunction barring all those practices save the restriction on outside-market game broadcasts during home games.

The Supreme Court later rejected the NFL's claim to the same antitrust exemption as baseball. Thus, in 1961, Congress passed the Sports Broadcasting Act, granting football and other professional team sports an exemption from antitrust law allowing them to negotiate television contracts as leagues and not individual teams.

Until 1973, league policy resulted in home-city blackouts even during sold-out regular-season games and championship games. For instance, the 1958 "Greatest Game Ever Played" between the Baltimore Colts and New York Giants was unavailable to viewers in the New York City market despite the sellout at Yankee Stadium (many fans rented hotel rooms or visited friends in areas of Connecticut or Pennsylvania where signals of television stations carrying the game were available to watch the game on television, a practice that continued for Giants games through 1972). Similarly, all Super Bowl games prior to Super Bowl VII in January 1973 were not televised in the host city's market.

A 1970 game between the New York Giants and New York Jets at Shea Stadium was broadcast in New York by WCBS-TV when the Jets agreed to lift the blackout to allow Giants fans to view the game live. Later that season, when the San Francisco 49ers visited the Oakland Raiders, Raiders owner Al Davis enforced the blackout in the Bay Area to the considerable anger of CBS, the 49ers and fans of both teams.

The policy was in effect when, in 1972, the Washington Redskins made the playoffs for only the second time in 27 seasons. Because all home games were blacked out, politicians, including President Richard Nixon, a devout football fan, were not able to watch their favorite team's home games, as the primary carrier for such games, CBS affiliate WTOP-TV (now WUSA) was forced to black out the games and carry alternate programming. NFL commissioner Pete Rozelle refused to lift the blackout for the NFC Championship Game, despite a plea from United States Attorney General Richard Kleindienst. Kleindienst went on to suggest that the United States Congress re-evaluate the NFL's antitrust exemption. (Nixon watched the playoff games vs. the Green Bay Packers and Dallas Cowboys from the Florida White House on Key Biscayne and from Camp David, respectively, and Super Bowl VII from his friend Bebe Rebozo's Ocean Reef Club in Key Largo, Florida)

Rozelle agreed to lift the blackout for Super Bowl VII on an "experimental basis," if the game sold out ten or more days in advance. With the game a sellout, viewers in the Los Angeles area were able to see the NBC telecast of the game. Nonetheless, Congress intervened before the 1973 season anyway, passing Public Law 93-107, sponsored by Democratic U.S. Representative Torbert MacDonald of Massachusetts (signed by Nixon on September 14, 1973, two days before the start of the regular season), which eliminated the blackout of games in the home market so long as the game was sold out by 72 hours before game time. The league will sometimes change this deadline to 48 hours if there are only a few thousand tickets left to be sold. Much more rarely, the NFL will occasionally reduce the deadline to 24 hours in special cases, such as when there is a very low number of tickets (fewer than 1,000) remaining with 48 hours left before the game, or if holidays fall during the 72 and/or 48 hour deadlines.

Unsold tickets allocated to visiting teams, as well as all seats located in premium club sections and luxury suites have been excluded from the blackout rule. Unsold tickets allocated to visiting teams may be sold by the home team after the blackout deadline has passed. Modern NFL stadiums have reduced general seating in favor of club seating and luxury suites, as this makes it easier to sell out the stadium and avoid blackouts. Revenue from premium club seating and luxury suites does not have to be shared with other franchises. Alternatively, some NFL teams have arrangements with local television stations or businesses (often sponsors of the team and/or its local broadcasts) to purchase unsold tickets. Teams themselves are allowed to purchase remaining non-premium tickets at 34¢ on the dollar (the portion subject to revenue sharing) to prevent a blackout. Teams can also lift the blackout on their own; this has occasionally been done in cases of stormy weather on game days.

The NFL requires that closing off sections be done uniformly for every home game, including playoff games, in a given season. This prevents teams from trying to sell out the entire stadium only when they expect to be able to do so. For instance, the Jacksonville Jaguars closed off a number of sections at their home stadium, EverBank Field, to reduce the number of tickets they would need to sell. EverBank Field is one of the largest venues in the NFL, as it was built to also accommodate the annual Florida-Georgia game and Gator Bowl in college football, and was expanded for Super Bowl XXXIX, even though it draws from one of the smallest markets in the league.

The NFL authorized a new rule loosening the league's blackout restrictions during the 2012 offseason. Under the new rule, for the first time in NFL history, the ticket sales provision no longer requires a stadium to be sold out in order for a game to be televised; instead, teams are allowed to set a benchmark of anywhere from 85% to 100% of the stadium's non-premium seats. Any seats sold beyond that benchmark will be subject to heavier revenue sharing. While most teams participate in the new blackout rules, four teams: the Buffalo Bills, Cleveland Browns, Indianapolis Colts and San Diego Chargers, continued to follow the previous blackout rule, as under the 2012 rule modification, the teams would be required to pay a higher percentage of gate fees to the NFL's revenue fund.

=== End of FCC enforcement, temporary suspension ===
Until September 2014, the NFL blackout rules were sanctioned by the Federal Communications Commission (FCC), which enforced rules requiring cable and satellite providers to not distribute any sports telecast that had been blacked out by a broadcast television station within their market of service. On September 9, 2014, USA Today published an editorial from FCC chairman Tom Wheeler, which stated that he was submitting a proposal to "get rid of the FCC's blackout rules once and for all", to be voted on by the agency's members on September 30 of that year, declaring such policies to be "obsolete". On September 30, 2014, the Commission voted unanimously to repeal the FCC's blackout rules. However, the removal of these rules are, to an extent, purely symbolic. The NFL can still enforce its blackout policies on a contractual basis with television networks, stations, and service providers, a process made feasible by the large amount of leverage the league places on its media partners.

Ultimately, no games would be blacked out at all during the 2014 season. On March 23, 2015, the NFL's owners voted to suspend the blackout rules for the 2015 NFL season, meaning that all games would be televised in their home markets, regardless of ticket sales. The suspension continued into the 2016 season; commissioner Roger Goodell stated that the league needed to further investigate the impact of removing the blackout rules before such a change is made permanent. While the league never explicitly stated such, the blackout suspension continued into 2017.

== Blackout radius ==
The NFL defines a team's market area as "local" if it is within a 75-mile (121 km) radius of the team's home stadium. Therefore, a blackout affects any market where the terrestrial broadcast signal of an affiliate station, under normal conditions, penetrates into the 75-mile radius. These affiliates are determined before the season, and do not change as the season progresses. Some remote primary media markets, such as Denver and Phoenix, may cover that entire radius, so that the blackout would not affect any other affiliates. However, in some instances, a very tiny portion of a distant city's market area can be within the 75-mile radius of a different city, therefore leading to blackouts well beyond the targeted area.

The most notable example is the blackout of Buffalo Bills games within the Syracuse, New York market because a small section of the town of Italy in Yates County, containing a handful of people, lies within the 75-mile radius of Highmark Stadium (a stadium that has failed to sell out numerous times, usually due to the harsh winter weather the area receives on the shores of Lake Erie and fans not commuting to Orchard Park for their safety or by municipal orders and not the Bills' playing record by itself); while the entirety of the remainder of the Syracuse market lies outside of it. Yates County was previously part of the Syracuse DMA (Designated Market Area), but it was later transferred into the Rochester DMA because of exurb expansion with an increasing number of employees working in the immediate Rochester area living in Yates County and traveling to Rochester for events. Despite this, the league still enforced Bills blackouts for Syracuse and, because the Mohawk Valley did not have a CBS affiliate of its own and relied on Syracuse CBS affiliate WTVH to cover that area, the Mohawk Valley DMA as well (despite the fact that no part of that area comes remotely close to the 75-mile threshold); because of this, the Bills' blackout radius extended hundreds of miles beyond the actual stadium, well into Herkimer County. (In 2015, the DT2 subchannel of Utica's NBC affiliate WKTV affiliated with CBS, ending the Mohawk Valley's blackouts; should the blackout rule be reimposed, that market will no longer face blackouts.)

The NFL does allow in some cases for secondary markets to extend beyond the 75 mile radius in part to help draw fans to attend the game. Some of these exceptions are in Charlotte, North Carolina, where many of its secondary markets lie outside the 75 mile radius (Greensboro and Raleigh). Others include Los Angeles, primarily due to San Diego (116 miles (187 km) from Los Angeles) not having had an NFL team since the 2017 move of the Chargers to Los Angeles.

An exception to the 75-mile rule is the Green Bay Packers' market area, which stretches out to both the Green Bay and Milwaukee television markets, with two radio stations sharing flagship duties (the city's WTMJ served as the network's flagship until 2021, and select Packer home games were played in that city until 1994). Unofficially, and to a smaller extent, it also reaches the Escanaba–Marquette, Michigan market (before station availability and network changes between 2010 and 2022) due to the presence of translator and satellite stations as well as extended cable coverage of stations from the Green Bay market north into the Upper Peninsula of Michigan. However, blackouts at the Packers have never occurred; the Packers' home stadium, Lambeau Field, boasts a five-decade-long streak of sellouts. The Denver Broncos, Pittsburgh Steelers and Washington Commanders also have sellout streaks that predate the current blackout rules, and therefore have not had any of their home games blacked out since 1972 (each of these teams also have long waiting lists for season tickets).

No Super Bowl has ever been unavailable in the market of origin since Super Bowl VII in 1973.

== No opposing games ==
Another policy to encourage sellouts has been that no other NFL game can air opposite the local franchise's broadcast on the primary market's affiliate due to NFL rules or due to a blackout, with the exception of the final week of the season. The NFL relaxed this restriction beginning in 2019, allowing a station to air a game opposite the local home team up to two times. The following year, the NFL doubled the number to four, owing largely to the COVID-19 pandemic limiting the number of fans in attendance but also difficulty for viewers in New York City and Los Angeles to see many games outside of the two teams in each market (Giants/Jets and Chargers/Rams respectively) as one would be in town most weeks.

- If a local franchise is playing at home, and the broadcast is part of a doubleheader, the other network (which shows the single game) may only show a game in the opposite time slot;
- If a local franchise is playing at home, and the broadcast is shown by the network carrying only one game, the other network (which shows the doubleheader) may only show a game in the opposite time slot, with the doubleheader effectively cancelled in that affected market. Though the NFL has relaxed this rule first in 2019 allowing up to a Competing Game twice before upping it to 4 in 2020 and remaining in place since then.
- If a local franchise is playing an away game, and the broadcast is shown by the network on which it is the only NFL game airing that week, the other network (which shows the doubleheader) may air both of their games;
- If a local franchise is playing on the road on the network carrying a doubleheader, the other network can air its single game in the same timeslot opposite the local franchise's game. However, affiliates in the local franchise's primary market almost always opt against it because such an action usually ensures low ratings. The "no opposing game" policy is a key reason why single game fixtures on the East Coast are occasionally scheduled for the late time slot.

Special exemptions are in effect when other events (such as the US Open Tennis Championships Final through 2014, the Major League Baseball playoffs, golf with the 1991 and 1995 Ryder Cup and 2020 Masters Tournament) air on one of the two networks broadcasting Sunday games, which typically have a 4:30 p.m. start time (tennis or baseball), or will run through 1:00 p.m. (golf). The network airing the event is given the single game at 1:00 or 4:00 p.m. that week, and can broadcast games opposite the team that has a home game on their network at the same time during the affected weeks. This was most notably used by CBS for tennis, both CBS and NBC for golf, and all three networks that have aired Sunday games (CBS, NBC and Fox) have used the exemption for baseball. Most recently, CBS used the exemption in 2020 for the first 2021 season Masters Tournament in November 2020, which aired November 15 during the early slot followed by the NFL at 4:05 p.m. EST. The golf tournament was moved from its traditional April date due to the COVID-19 pandemic. In 2022, Fox had the option of using the exemption for the 2022 FIFA World Cup final on December 18 (Week 15), but with a 10:00 a.m. start time for the World Cup Final, and any potential extra time or penalty kicks after extra time likely finishing before the 1:00 p.m. start time of NFL games, they declined to initially reserve games to only late games.

As of the 2021 season, these rules do not apply in Week 18, where playoff or draft implications are affected by many games. Because of the nature of Week 18 games with playoff implications, all restrictions except the blackout for failure to sell out games rule are waived, giving Fox and CBS doubleheaders for Week 18 in all markets, regardless of whether the local team is at home.

Each television market, including one hosting a game that is not sold out, is assured of at least one televised game in the early and late time slots, one game on each network, but no network doubleheader in the home market of a game that is not sold out.

- If a blackout is in the early game of a doubleheader, the network may not air a game in the late game slot;
- If a blackout is in the late game of a doubleheader, the network may not air a game in the early game slot;
- If a blackout is in the early game slot and shown by the network scheduled to carry a single game, the network must show another game in the early or late game slot;
- If a blackout is in the late game slot, shown by the network scheduled to carry a single game and is the only game in the late game slot, the network must show a game during the early game slot.

This policy affects only the franchise's primary market, not others with signals that penetrate inside the 75-mile radius. It also does not affect viewers of NFL Sunday Ticket in the primary market; all other games remain available.

In the case of the New York and Los Angeles markets, the NFL often schedules both local teams at the same time to circumvent the restriction (i.e. a Jets home game airs on WCBS-TV at 1 p.m., while the Giants have a road game on WNYW).

Some markets, like those in Southwest Georgia, can see up to five (or even six) NFL games a week, with different network affiliates offering games involving the Falcons and Jaguars, and doubleheaders for the other conference's affiliate in the same market. Central New Jersey offers similar access to the New York and Philadelphia markets.

== Blackout procedure ==
One of the following situations will occur, if a home game is unavailable locally, because it is not sold out before the 72-hour deadline:

- If the blacked out home game is a nationally televised game on a broadcast network (such as on NBC for its Sunday Night Football telecast, although this is rare due to such games having higher stakes), where no other NFL games are played at the same time, all local stations inside the 75-mile radius must broadcast alternative programming (the stations have to program the time themselves, since other affiliates are showing the game). This scenario is unlikely to happen since the 2006 NFL rule changes regarding reassigning game start times for Sunday games, known as "flexible scheduling." As a result of the rule change, Sunday night games are scheduled to have highly anticipated contests featuring teams in good form. As a result, the chances of a home game not selling out during the first quarter of the season, when there is still hope for a team to rebound after a poor start, are remote, and the only possible situations where this is likely to happen are on Thanksgiving or Christmas (Thanksgiving Day games for all three rightsholder networks are assigned in advance, and in years when Christmas Eve falls during the weekend (if on a Saturday, most NFL Sunday games, except the one Christmas Day game on Sunday night, are assigned to Saturday, and if on a Sunday, NBC's game is assigned to 5:00 p.m. Eastern Time on Christmas Day – if observed on a Monday, so that game is assigned in advance).

The 2006 NFL rule change allows NBC and the NFL to reassign game start times for Sunday games only, beginning in Week 11, although the NFL changed this clause to Week 5 in 2014 (with the rule that only two of the six possible Sunday night games could have reassigned start times). Therefore, if a late-season match features a game with no playoff implications (both teams have been eliminated, or the game has no seeding implications), often with the home team already eliminated, and thus would be unlikely to sell out, it will be moved to Sunday afternoon in favor of a better game (a prime example being in 2010 when a game between the Chargers and the Cincinnati Bengals was moved to the afternoon in favor of one involving the Minnesota Vikings and Philadelphia Eagles, which ended up being played on Tuesday due to severe winter weather in the Philadelphia area; the Bengals game ended up being blacked out, and thus WKRC-TV and two other nearby CBS affiliates – WHIO-TV in Dayton, Ohio and WKYT-TV in Lexington, Kentucky – could not carry it).

- If the blacked-out nationally televised game is being shown on a cable network (such as ESPN or the NFL Network), all cable and satellite television providers in markets that are within the 75-mile radius, in addition already to the primary market of the home team (which is already blacked out), must black out the cable broadcaster's feed to customers in affected markets during the game (this is a condition of the channels' agreements with both the league and the providers). In addition, the game is not simulcast on a local broadcast station in the blacked-out markets. Local stations would still be able to show highlights during their newscasts after the game has concluded. In areas where the game is blacked out, ESPN and the NFL Network would generally offer alternate programming (ESPN traditionally switches to a simulcast of ESPNews). As ESPN and NFL Network games featuring the local teams are syndicated in the local markets under the NFL's anti-siphoning policies, the station that holds local rights to the cable broadcasts but cannot show the games originally scheduled to be carried would either run their own alternate programming or, if affiliated with a major network, show the regularly scheduled network programming for that night. During the pre-season, blacked out games can be aired in their entirety, but only on tape delay (generally after late-evening newscasts).
- If the blacked-out home game is played on a Sunday afternoon, all local stations inside the 75-mile radius must show a different NFL game during that time slot – the network typically chooses the game (typically a #1 game for that slot). In addition, NFL Sunday Ticket cannot telecast the game within that area. A network scheduled to run a doubleheader can broadcast only one game into that team's primary market (usually the #1 game), which is designed to prevent viewers from opting to watch the other televised NFL games instead of attending that involving their local team, thus, also cancelling a doubleheader in this case. Again, the secondary markets would still carry a doubleheader. In some cases, the network-affiliated stations will switch time slots so that the network running the doubleheader can still show its featured 4:25 p.m. (Eastern Time) game.
- The NFL Mobile app for mobile devices periodically checks the user's location in order to enforce blackouts, and will not show a blacked-out game if the device is being used in the game's home market. Transmissions are also blacked out if the mobile device utilizes cell towers or wifi signals within or near the home stadium.

In 2005, for the first time in its history, the NFL lifted the blackout policies for a team: the New Orleans Saints. Due to damage caused by Hurricane Katrina, the Saints split their home games between Giants Stadium in East Rutherford, New Jersey, Tiger Stadium at Louisiana State University in Baton Rouge, and the Alamodome in San Antonio, with most home games being played in Baton Rouge. Baton Rouge is a secondary market for the Saints and is subject to blackouts when games held at the Superdome carried by over-the-air networks do not sell out, since CBS affiliate WAFB, Fox affiliate WGMB and NBC affiliate WVLA reach within 75 miles (121 km) of the Superdome (in Ascension Parish, which contains approximately 15 percent of the Baton Rouge metropolitan area's population), even though the city limits of Baton Rouge are more than 75 miles from the stadium (the Baton Rouge DMA is not subjected to a blackout when Saints games televised by ESPN or the NFL Network do not sell out, since no community in the metropolitan area is within 40 miles of the Superdome).

San Antonio is an unofficial secondary market for the Dallas Cowboys (in that the Cowboys games are routinely televised in that area, but the area is not within the 75 mile blackout radius), and two of three Saints games in 2005 played at the Alamodome were not broadcast anywhere in Texas, as the start times for the Cowboys and Saints games conflicted on those dates. The only game of the San Antonio dates not to sell out, in Week 4 against Buffalo, was televised locally by CBS (on KENS-TV) as the Cowboys had a late game that day against the Oakland Raiders at McAfee Coliseum (Fox affiliate KABB, therefore, never broadcast a Saints home game in the San Antonio market, as the Cowboys and Saints are in the National Football Conference, and the Cowboys have a larger following in Texas).

The blackout policies extend even to the Pro Bowl; if that game is not sold out, it is not televised in the home media market. From 1980 to 2009, and again from 2011 to 2014, the game was played in Halawa, making the applicable market the entire state of Hawaii. The 2010 game was played in the Miami area (at Sun Life Stadium).

Due to decreasing ticket sales, the league significantly softened its blackout policy in 2009. Though the traditional rules still apply, the league is using some of its new media features to provide access to untelecasted games. For instance, the league will not subject its "RedZone" channel to any blackouts. In addition, complete live games will be made available for free online on the Monday (except Monday Night Football), Tuesday and Wednesday following the game, if the game is blacked out, using the league's Game Rewind package.

== Criticism ==
Critics claim that these blackout policies are largely ineffective in creating sold out, filled stadiums. They contend that there are other factors that prevent sellouts, such as high ticket prices and low enthusiasm for a losing team. Furthermore, it has been argued that blackouts hurt the league; without the television exposure, it becomes more difficult for those teams with low attendance and few sellouts to increase their popularity and following as the exposure decreases.

Conversely, the NFL has sold out well over 90% of games in recent seasons. Additionally, many teams sell out their entire regular season schedule before it begins (usually through season-ticket sales; at least half of all NFL teams have a season-ticket waiting list), and so there is no threat of a blackout in those markets.

== Secondary markets ==
The league also designates "secondary markets", usually adjoining primary markets (generally areas within 75 miles of a stadium, but not having their own team) that are also required to show the local NFL franchise. Generally, these secondary markets must show the away games but are not obligated to telecast the designated team's sold-out home games.

Their decision on whether to show home games typically depends on whether the NFL-designated local team is perceived to be the most popular in the market. For example, Harrisburg, Pennsylvania is a secondary market to the Baltimore Ravens; therefore the Harrisburg market's CBS affiliate, WHP-TV, must show all Ravens away games (unless a Ravens away game is switched to Sunday Night Football, or is cross-flexed to FOX). However, since there are many Pittsburgh Steelers fans in the region, when the Ravens are home at the same time the Steelers are playing, that station shows the latter game. Harrisburg is thus considered a battleground territory for the Steelers–Ravens rivalry.

The same applies for the Orlando, Florida metropolitan area, as its local CBS affiliate WKMG-TV broadcasts both Miami Dolphins and Jacksonville Jaguars games. In some cases, the NFL has the two teams play at different times to accommodate the entire state of Florida (but only when CBS has the doubleheader, or if one of the teams is on Fox). WKMG lobbied to carry a Dolphins game against the Tampa Bay Buccaneers in 2005, but the NFL refused this request – as Orlando is officially a Jaguars secondary market (despite downtown Orlando being 141 miles from the Jaguars' home, EverBank Stadium, compared to 88 miles from the Buccaneers' home, Raymond James Stadium) the station had to carry the Jaguars game at Pittsburgh. This issue again came up in 2013, during Week 2, when CBS' late game window featured two games: the Denver Broncos at the New York Giants (which was a much-hyped matchup between brothers Peyton and Eli Manning) and the Jaguars at the Oakland Raiders (a matchup of two teams that were not expected to contend for the playoffs). Again, since Orlando is a secondary market of the Jaguars, WKMG was required to carry the latter game; the station notoriously apologized for having to show the Jaguars game. There have been exceptions, however; in the last week of the 2016 season, the Jaguars played their regular season finale on the road at the Indianapolis Colts, while the Dolphins played their regular season finale against the New England Patriots at home. Since the Jaguars were on the road, this should have meant WKMG would be required to carry the Jaguars-Colts game. However, the Jaguars granted a one-time waiver of the secondary markets rule requirement for the Orlando market, thus allowing WKMG to air the Patriots-Dolphins game; this is most likely because the Dolphins had clinched a playoff spot the previous week and the Patriots were going for home-field advantage in the AFC, while both the Jaguars and Colts had both been eliminated from playoff contention.

=== Two-team secondary markets ===
There are rare instances where a market will have two teams claiming their territory. For instance, Youngstown, Ohio lies roughly halfway between Cleveland and Pittsburgh, is within the 75-mile radius for both cities and is considered a battleground territory in the Browns–Steelers rivalry. Therefore, local CBS affiliate WKBN-TV must show whichever team is playing an away game. If one game is on CBS while the other is on Fox, both games will air (WKBN's parent company also owns low-powered Fox affiliate WYFX-LD, which is simulcast on WKBN's second digital subchannel). On Cable and Satellite providers on the Pennsylvania side of the Youngstown Market, like Mercer County and Lawrence County, those areas also carry CBS O&O KDKA-TV and Pittsburgh FOX Affiliate WPGH-TV in Standard-definition television as an alternate station.

If both the Cleveland Browns and the Pittsburgh Steelers are scheduled to play at the same time on CBS or Fox and the location of the game does not matter, WKBN/WYFX will usually air the Browns game. However, on December 2, 2012, when the Browns played at the Raiders and the Steelers played at the Ravens in the late window of a CBS doubleheader, WKBN aired the Steelers game as the former was between two teams that were out of playoff contention, while the latter was between two teams that were in playoff contention (as well as the AFC North title), and was also the main game of the late CBS window. The fan base is evenly split between those two teams, with the San Francisco 49ers also having a small following due to team owners John and Denise DeBartolo York being based out of the Youngstown suburb of Canfield, Ohio.

Similar issues concerning the same market teams occurred with CBS affiliate WTRF in Wheeling, West Virginia, which formerly carried Fox programming on its 7.2 subchannel (Fox Ohio Valley) until 2014, when WTOV-TV took over the affiliation on one of its subchannels. At times, WTRF would run a game broadcast by Fox on the subchannel opposite a Browns or Steelers home game that aired on the main CBS feed regardless, and vice versa.

=== "Unofficial" and "temporary" secondary markets ===
Many markets serve as "unofficial" secondary markets for the league's various teams due to rooting interest in those markets. As they are not designated by the NFL as official secondary markets, they technically are not required to air any games, but will do so to please the fanbases.

For example, in Texas, virtually all CBS and Fox stations respectively carry the Houston Texans and Dallas Cowboys when games involving those teams are on different networks. However until 2010, CBS owned-and-operated station KTVT in Dallas rarely aired Texans games unless it had no other option; but for the 2011 season, it carried most Texans games, except for a handful of conflicts. Fox owned-and-operated station KRIV in Houston always airs Cowboys games if it is not prohibited from doing so by NFL rules. In another example, Seattle Seahawks games are usually aired on Fox (and occasionally CBS) stations across the entire Pacific Northwest as the team is the only NFL franchise in the area.

The New England Patriots, especially since Tom Brady became quarterback, also have almost all of New England as unofficial secondary markets (Providence, Rhode Island is an official secondary market). Not only do all or almost all CBS or Fox (depending on the game carrier) affiliates in New England carry Patriots games, but the team's syndicated preseason broadcasts cover the entire region. Hartford, Connecticut is within proximity to New York, and stations in that market have sometimes aired a New York Jets game instead; however, this rarely occurs.

The New York Giants have most of the markets in upstate New York (with the exception of Western New York, which belongs to the Buffalo Bills) as unofficial secondary markets. Albany is considered an official secondary market of the Giants. In addition, Burlington, Vermont (whose Fox affiliate, WFFF-TV, has a coverage area that includes Plattsburgh in the eastern corner of New York) has become an unofficial market for the Giants, preventing the Patriots from having full control over all New England markets (the Patriots, as an American Football Conference team, still receive copious coverage on the local CBS affiliate, WCAX-TV). An example of this occurred on September 27, 2009, when the Giants hosted the Tampa Bay Buccaneers and the Patriots hosted the Atlanta Falcons, both at 1:00 p.m. Eastern Time. WFFF-TV, which covers most of the state of Vermont and also extreme northern New York, broadcast the Giants game, as it is used to airing the team's games as a Fox affiliate. More recently, however, WFFF-TV has aired Patriots games over those involving the Giants when the former is featured on the network. Boston affiliate WFXT generally (but not always) carries Fox's Sunday-afternoon Giants games other than those that cannot be carried on the station because the New England Patriots are playing a home game at the same time. Providence affiliate WNAC-TV carries Fox's Giants' games unless the network is broadcasting a Patriots' home game at the same time the Giants are playing.

Specifically due to the issues with requirements for Hartford, Connecticut CBS affiliate WFSB to carry mainly New York Jets games as a secondary market most weeks (and to a much lesser extent, the Buffalo Bills), Meredith Corporation established a new CBS affiliate in the Springfield, Massachusetts market in 2003, WSHM-LD, in order to allow that market to become a Patriots secondary market; previously, Meredith's WFSB served as the default CBS affiliate for the Springfield market, which otherwise contains only two other full-power commercial stations. This became a liability as the Patriots dynasty began, as viewers north of the Connecticut/Massachusetts line could not watch their home state's team most weeks. Four years later, ABC affiliate WGGB-TV established their own Fox DT2 subchannel, taking over from Hartford's WTIC-TV as Springfield's default Fox affiliate and allowing that market access to the remainder of Patriots Sunday home games with an NFC opponent (WGGB-DT2 otherwise carries mainly Giants home games like the remainder of New England's other stations). Over time however with the sustained success of the Patriots, WFSB has mainly moved towards carrying their games, with the Jets losing games on that station as time has gone on.

Since 1995, the San Francisco 49ers have had most of California from the Oregon-California border south to Los Angeles as an unofficial secondary market, although the Los Angeles area was a secondary market for the Chargers until the Rams' return to Los Angeles in 2016 and the Chargers own move there in 2017 (Sacramento is an official secondary market to the 49ers, and was for the Raiders when they played in Oakland).

An oddity of "temporary" secondary markets have occurred in Wisconsin, Washington and South Carolina as a result of a rooting interest in one particular player. After the 2007 season, quarterback Brett Favre departed the Green Bay Packers for the New York Jets. As a result, CBS affiliates WFRV in Green Bay (which was formerly owned by CBS) and WDJT-TV in Milwaukee were able to ask for as many Jets games as CBS and the NFL could offer to their viewers. In 2009, when Favre moved to an NFC North division rival, the Minnesota Vikings, Fox affiliates WLUK-TV in Green Bay and WITI in Milwaukee requested as many Vikings games on their stations as possible. This also occurred in 2011 in Seattle, where the market was able to broadcast Tennessee Titans games because former Seahawks quarterback Matt Hasselbeck was a Titans starter, and local native and former University of Washington quarterback Jake Locker was drafted in the first round of the 2011 NFL draft by the Titans. Given these two fan favorites, local CBS affiliate KIRO-TV requested to air as many of these games as possible. In 2014, CBS affiliate WLTX in Columbia, South Carolina requested to change game assignments for Week 17 from the San Diego Chargers–Kansas City Chiefs game to the Cleveland Browns–Baltimore Ravens game; WLTX requested the change when the Browns had undrafted rookie quarterback Connor Shaw, a fan favorite from the University of South Carolina, start the game.

Wichita is not an official secondary market for any team, but all Chiefs games are televised in the market, which covers more than half of Kansas. Stations KWCH and KSAS almost always show the Cowboys and/or Broncos when they do not conflict with the Chiefs.

In 2018, stations in Oklahoma City and Tulsa started requesting as many Cleveland Browns games as possible when 2017 Heisman Trophy winner Baker Mayfield, who starred for the University of Oklahoma, became the team's starting quarterback. The networks complied, except in cases when the Browns and Dallas Cowboys were playing at the same time on the same network; the Cowboys have enjoyed a large base of support in neighboring Oklahoma since their founding in 1960. Previously, the Minnesota Vikings were requested as much as possible by Oklahoma stations due to the presence of former OU star running back Adrian Peterson. Arizona Cardinals games which do not conflict with the Cowboys have frequently been broadcast into Oklahoma since 2019, when Kyler Murray, who won the Heisman Trophy with the Sooners in 2018, became the team's starting quarterback.

When 2014 Heisman winner Marcus Mariota from the University of Oregon was drafted by the Titans, stations in Oregon carried most Tennessee games when they did not conflict with broadcasts of the Seattle Seahawks during Mariota's tenure with the Titans. Other instances of markets carrying contests featuring alumnus of the local college include Philadelphia Eagles games in Fargo, North Dakota (former North Dakota State player Carson Wentz was the Eagles' starting quarterback), the Chiefs in Lubbock, Texas (and nearby Amarillo), where Patrick Mahomes attended Texas Tech. and the Ravens in Louisville, Kentucky, where Lamar Jackson attended Louisville.

Austin market stations would often show New Orleans Saints games when area-native Drew Brees was on the team (2006-20).

Since he became the Miami Dolphins' starting quarterback, native Hawaiian Tua Tagovailoa's games are almost always broadcast in Hawaii. Dolphins games are also frequently broadcast in Alabama because Tagovailoa played for Alabama in college. Many Titans games were broadcast there from 2015-19 when Hawaii native Mariota was on the team.

Since 2020, Baton Rouge stations have requested the Cincinnati Bengals whenever its broadcasts do not conflict with Saints broadcasts. The Bengals' #1 overall selection in the 2020 draft, quarterback Joe Burrow, led the LSU Tigers to the national championship in 2019 and became LSU's first Heisman Trophy winner in 60 years. Baton Rouge stations have also frequently requested Washington Commanders broadcasts which do not conflict with the Saints since 2024 after the club drafted another ex-LSU quarterback, 2023 Heisman Trophy winner Jayden Daniels.

New Orleans stations often requested games involving natives Peyton Manning (Colts 1998-2010, Broncos 2012-15) and Eli Manning (Giants, 2004-19), sons of former Saints quarterback Archie Manning (1971-82), when they did not conflict with the Saints.

The Cedar Rapids, Iowa market often airs Chicago Bears games due it being home to the University of Iowa, which has long had a strong contingent of students from the Chicagoland area. Elsewhere in Iowa, affiliates in Des Moines have requested many San Francisco 49ers games after former Iowa State standout Brock Purdy became the team's starting quarterback late in the 2022 season. Iowa State's campus in Ames is 35 miles from downtown Des Moines.

=== Other information ===
In all other markets, the networks are the sole arbiters of the telecast matches. However, they usually make their decisions after consulting with all of their local affiliates. On rarer occasions, some affiliates are offered a choice of a few games for a given time slot, if there is no game that stands out as appropriate. In those cases, some stations have allowed the viewers to vote online for their preferred game. In the early 1990s, New Orleans NBC affiliate WDSU conducted a poll via telephone during several weeks to select which game would be broadcast, as long as that game did not conflict with a Saints broadcast on WWL.

For example, during Week 3 of the 2010 season, Fox affiliate KMSS-TV in Shreveport, Louisiana conducted an online viewer poll in which fans could choose between the Dallas Cowboys–Houston Texans game and the Atlanta Falcons–New Orleans Saints game. The station is situated in the Ark-La-Tex region, where both the Saints and Cowboys have significant fan bases, due to the Shreveport market being situated on the northern border between Louisiana and Texas, including Texarkana, and the southwest corner of Arkansas. The poll concluded with viewers choosing the Falcons-Saints game, even though Shreveport is closer to Dallas than New Orleans. KMSS had previously run similar polls during the 2009 season; the in-state Saints, having won their first 13 games of the season, saw a spike in popularity which necessitated the viewers’ polls. Earlier, during at least part of the 1991 season; NBC affiliate WAVY-TV in Portsmouth, Virginia had call-in contests in which viewers of their newscasts could call in to request one of two games being offered opposite a game involving the Washington Redskins that aired on local CBS affiliate WTKR-TV, though if NBC had the doubleheader the game not airing opposite the Redskins game would have to be the one NBC assigned to the station.

On one rare instance during Week 16 of the 2016 season, KCBS-TV in Los Angeles was granted special permission to air a Colts–Raiders game in the 1:05 p.m. PT late slot while the Los Angeles Rams hosted the 49ers at the same time at home on Fox. Although KCBS had the single game and was contractually obligated to carry the San Diego Chargers game at the Cleveland Browns in the early 10 a.m. PT slot since Los Angeles is an official secondary market of the Chargers, the Colts–Raiders game had playoff implications as well as Los Angeles having a large Raiders fan base due to the fact that the team played in Los Angeles from 1982 to 1994.

Networks, however, have the ability to override a station's request; WIVB-TV in Buffalo, for instance, requested a New England Patriots–Denver Broncos game in December 2011, due to the fact that the hometown Buffalo Bills faced both teams in the upcoming weeks and because of the high-profile showdown between Tim Tebow and Tom Brady; the station instead received a game between the New York Jets and Philadelphia Eagles.
