= WMIK =

WMIK can refer to:

- WMIK (AM), a radio station (560 AM) licensed to Middlesboro, Kentucky, United States
- WMIK-FM, a radio station (92.7 FM) licensed to Middlesboro, Kentucky, United States
- WMIK, a Land Rover Wolf armoured military utility vehicle in service with UK Armed Forces and the Dutch Marine Corps.
