= CBS Springfield =

CBS Springfield could refer to:

- WSHM-LD (Springfield, Massachusetts)
- WCIA (Springfield, Illinois)
- KOLR (Springfield, Missouri)
