= 560 AM =

AM radio frequency

The following radio stations broadcast on AM frequency 560 kHz: The Federal Communications Commission categorizes 560 AM as a regional frequency; the maximum power for any station on this frequency (in the United States) is 5,000 watts.

== Argentina ==
- LRA9 in Esquel, Chubut.
- LRA13 in Bahía Blanca, Buenos Aires.
- LRA16 in La Quiaca, Jujuy.
- LT15 in San Antonio de Padua de la Concordia, Entre Ríos.
- LV1 in San Juan, San Juan.

== Brazil ==
- ZYH456 in Itabuna
- ZYH604 in Limoeiro do Norte
- ZYH887 in São Luís, Maranhão
- ZYI-806 in Mamanguape
- ZYJ-214 in Londrina
- ZYJ-281 in Guarapuava
- ZYJ-496 in Araruama
- ZYK-231 in Caxias do Sul
- ZYK419 in Tangará da Serra
- ZYK761 in Santa Isabel
- ZYL277 in Patrocinio

== Canada ==
- CFOS in Owen Sound, Ontario - 7.5 kW daytime, 1 kW nighttime, transmitter located at 44.5444°N 80.9019°W

== Colombia ==
- HJGS in Tunja
- HJPF in Maicao

== Cuba ==
- CMIA in Ciego de Ávila

== Dominican Republic ==
- HIAA in Santiago

== Ecuador ==
- HCBN2 in Guayaquil

== Guyana ==
- 8RG in Sparendaam

== Honduras ==
- HRPX in San Pedro Sula

== Jamaica ==
- JCB in Naggo Head

== Mexico ==
- XEGIK-AM in Ciudad Frontera, Coahuila
- XEMZA-AM in Cihuatlán, Jalisco
- XEOC-AM in Mexico City
- XESRD-AM in Mesa San Antonio, Durango
- XEYO-AM in Huatabampo, Sonora

== Panama ==
- HOH 2 in Nuevo San Juan

== Peru ==
- OBZ4L in Lima

== United States ==
Call sign	City of license	Facility ID	Class	Daytime power (kW)	Nighttime power (kW)	Unlimited power (kW)	Transmitter coordinates
KBLU	Yuma, Arizona	62233	B	1	1		32.723333°N 114.642778°W
KLVI	Beaumont, Texas	25580	B	5	5		30.045278°N 93.870833°W (daytime); 30.045556°N 93.868611°W (nighttime)
KLZ	Denver, Colorado	35088	B			5	39.843333°N 104.953889°W
KMON	Great Falls, Montana	62330	B	5	5		47.424722°N 111.288889°W
KPQ	Wenatchee, Washington	71715	B	5	5		47.453333°N 120.328611°W
KWTO	Springfield, Missouri	35900	B	5	4		36.944444°N 93.221389°W
WEBC	Duluth, Minnesota	49689	B	5	5		46.643611°N 91.985833°W
WFIL	Philadelphia, Pennsylvania	52193	B	5	5		40.095°N 75.277222°W
WFRB	Frostburg, Maryland	71868	D	5	0.055		39.683333°N 78.965278°W
WGAI	Elizabeth City, North Carolina	72731	B	1	0.5		36.337778°N 76.246944°W
WGAN	Portland, Maine	58544	B	5	5		43.69°N 70.318056°W
WHBQ	Memphis, Tennessee	21727	B	5	1		35.253333°N 90.0475°W
WHYN	Springfield, Massachusetts	55757	B	5	1		42.193611°N 72.683889°W
WIND	Chicago, Illinois	67068	B	5	5		41.565°N 87.419722°W
WJLS	Beckley, West Virginia	52335	B	4.5	0.47		37.758889°N 81.186667°W
WMIK	Middlesboro, Kentucky	23335	D	2.5	0.088		36.627222°N 83.714444°W
WNSR	Brentwood, Tennessee	41062	D	1	0.075		36.141111°N 86.756389°W
WOOF	Dothan, Alabama	73675	D	5	0.118		31.218056°N 85.352778°W
WQAM	Miami, Florida	64002	B	4.1	1		25.839444°N 80.189722°W
WRDT	Monroe, Michigan	25083	D	0.5	0.014		41.891111°N 83.4275°W (daytime); 42.453611°N 83.163889°W (nighttime)
WVOC	Columbia, South Carolina	11902	B	5	5		34.031944°N 81.141944°W

== Venezuela ==
- YVRH in Puerto Ordaz
