= WFSB =

Television station in Hartford, Connecticut

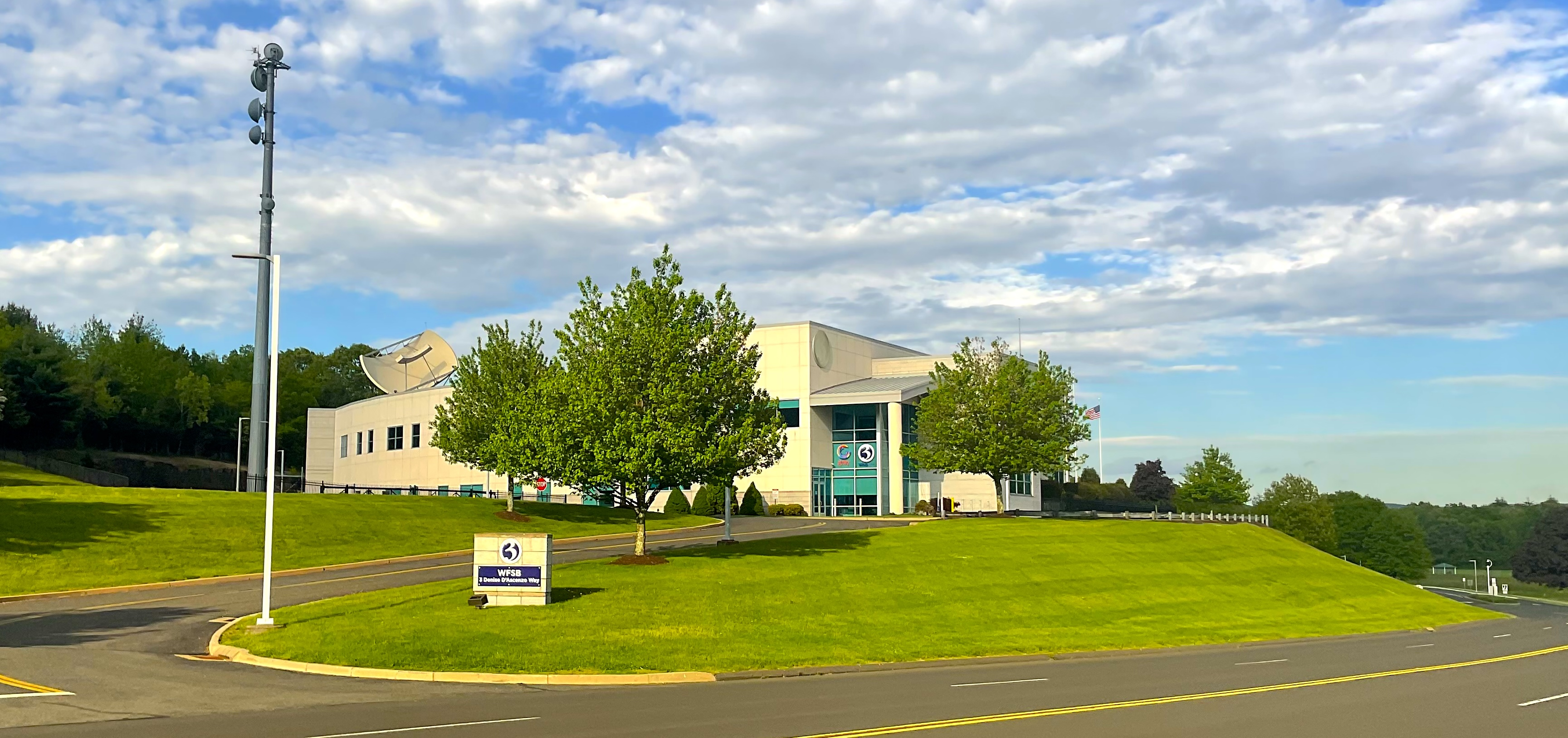
- WFSB's studio facility in Rocky Hill off Capital Boulevard, located directly west of Henkel's North American headquarters. The road into the station's parking lot was re-dedicated as Denise D'Ascenzo Way in the spring of 2020.
- Hartford–New Haven, Connecticut; United States
- City: Hartford, Connecticut
- Channels: Digital: 36 (UHF); Virtual: 3
- Branding: Channel 3; Channel 3 Eyewitness News

Programming
- Affiliations: 3.1: CBS; for others, see § Subchannels

Ownership
- Owner: Gray Media; (Gray Television Licensee, LLC)
- Sister stations: WGGB-TV, WSHM-LD, WWAX-LD

History
- First air date: September 23, 1957
- Former call signs: WTIC-TV (1957–1974)
- Former channel numbers: Analog: 3 (VHF, 1957–2009); Digital: 33 (UHF, 2005–2019)
- Former affiliations: Independent (1957–1958)
- Call sign meaning: Frederick Sessions Beebe (former president of former owner Post-Newsweek Stations)

Technical information
- Licensing authority: FCC
- Facility ID: 53115
- ERP: 1,000 kW
- HAAT: 289 m (948 ft)
- Transmitter coordinates: 41°46′30″N 72°48′18.3″W

Links
- Public license information: Public file; LMS
- Website: www.wfsb.com

WWAX-LD
- Hartford, Connecticut; United States
- Channels: Digital: 27 (UHF); Virtual: 27
- Branding: theWAX

Programming
- Affiliations: 27.1: Independent; for others, see § Subchannels

Ownership
- Owner: Gray Media; (Gray Television Licensee, LLC)

History
- First air date: March 11, 2013 (in Westmoreland, NH)
- Former call signs: W20EB-D; W27ER-D
- Former channel number: Digital: 20 (UHF)
- Call sign meaning: The word wax

Technical information
- Licensing authority: FCC
- Facility ID: 186687
- Class: LD
- ERP: 15 kW
- HAAT: 273.7 m (898 ft)
- Transmitter coordinates: 41°46′30″N 72°48′18.3″W

Links
- Public license information: LMS
- Website: www.wfsb.com/wwax/

WFSB (channel 3) is a television station licensed to Hartford, Connecticut, United States, serving the Hartford–New Haven market as an affiliate of CBS. Owned by Gray Media, the station maintains studios on Denise D'Ascenzo Way in Rocky Hill and a transmitter on Talcott Mountain in Avon, Connecticut.

Most of WFSB's programs are seen in Springfield, Massachusetts, over a low-power semi-satellite station, WSHM-LD (channel 33). That station is based at the facilities of sister station WGGB-TV (channel 40) in Springfield, although some master control and other internal operations are hubbed through WFSB.

Gray also owns low-power station WWAX-LD (channel 27), also licensed to Hartford. Known on-air as theWax, WWAX-LD mainly features simulcasts and repeats of WFSB's news programming, along with second runs of its syndicated shows and other Gray-produced programming. Its own third subchannel features a full-time automated feed of WFSB news briefs, headlines, current weather conditions, and other miscellanea known as Eyewitness News Now, which simulcasts on the station's website and mobile app.

== History ==
WFSB signed on the air on September 23, 1957, as WTIC-TV, owned by the Hartford-based Travelers Insurance Company, along with WTIC radio (1080 AM and 96.5 FM). As Connecticut's second VHF station, WTIC-TV was one of the most powerful stations in New England, not only covering the entire state but a large chunk of western Massachusetts and eastern Long Island in New York. It provided secondary coverage to much of the southern sections of Vermont and New Hampshire. During its first year on the air, Channel 3 was an independent station, as ABC was affiliated with the state's other VHF outlet, WNHC-TV (channel 8, now WTNH) in New Haven; while CBS and NBC had owned-and-operated stations on the UHF band in the market, WHCT-TV (channel 18, now Univision affiliate WUVN) in Hartford and WNBC (channel 30, now WVIT) in New Britain, respectively. With no network affiliation, WTIC-TV devoted much of its airtime to movies, syndicated programs that were mostly on film, and three daily newscasts (including one at 10 pm).

In 1958, CBS was looking to sell WHCT-TV. The network's ratings had been alarmingly low in the market because television manufacturers were not required to have UHF tuners at the time. Many viewers northeast of Hartford got a better signal for CBS programming from WNAC-TV (now WHDH) in Boston, or WPRO-TV (now WPRI-TV) in Providence, Rhode Island; while those southwest of Hartford with an outdoor antenna were able to watch the network via New York City flagship station WCBS-TV. Network head William S. Paley decided that it was better to have CBS air its programming on a VHF station, even if it was only an affiliate. WTIC-TV was the obvious choice due to its massive coverage area. Paley quickly negotiated an affiliation deal, and channel 3 became the network's new affiliate on November 16, 1958. WTIC radio had been with NBC Radio for over thirty years. Soon after the affiliation switch, channel 3 surged to the top of the ratings, and has remained there more or less ever since.

The switch to WTIC-TV for CBS had repercussions in Springfield. Although Springfield already had a CBS affiliate in WHYN-TV (channel 40, now sister station WGGB-TV), that station's owners, the Hampden-Hampshire Corporation, knew they would find the going difficult competing against WTIC-TV's stronger VHF signal. WHYN-TV sought to move to the VHF band as well, to no avail. In response, WHYN-TV switched its affiliation to ABC (previously, some ABC programs had been seen on WWLP). Over the years, WTIC-TV repeatedly blocked WHYN/WGGB's attempts to switch back to CBS.

The station also played a role in a nadir for the New York Giants in the 1970s, as the station is outside of the NFL's 75-mile (121 km) blackout radius and the team was entering a long period of futility and a nomadic existence after losing Yankee Stadium when it was renovated exclusively into a baseball venue, as the team waited for Giants Stadium to be built and open in 1976. This included games being played at New Haven's Yale Bowl, a 71,000 seat venue which was impossible to sell out. Despite this, the team had a decades-long fanbase, well before the New England Patriots could begin to compete equally in the market. This meant that fans of the team in the New York area who refused to support the team with their attendance, would then drive into the Hartford–New Haven area to watch Giants home games, either by patronizing area bars or checking into a motel room while the game was on channel 3.

In 1962, the WTIC stations moved to Broadcast House, a state-of-the-art facility in the Constitution Plaza development in Downtown Hartford. A decade later, in late 1972, Travelers Insurance decided to exit broadcasting. The announcement was made to the staff at an employee meeting held in Studio A on January 15, 1973. While the WTIC radio stations were spun off to a company formed by station management called 1080 Corporation, WTIC-TV was sold to The Washington Post Company. The sale of all three stations was closed on March 8, 1974, and the Post's broadcasting division, Post-Newsweek Stations, changed Channel 3's call letters on that date to the current WFSB in honor of broadcasting division president Frederick Sessions Beebe, who had died a few months earlier. At the time, the FCC did not allow television and radio stations in the same market to share the same call letters if they had different owners. To get the WFSB call letters, the Post had to convince Framingham State College in Framingham, Massachusetts, to give up those call letters, which were used on the college's low-power FM radio station, whose call letters were changed to WDJM-FM as a result of the switch. The WTIC call letters returned to Connecticut television in 1984 when Arch Communications, owned by the son of the then-owner of WTIC radio, launched a new independent station on channel 61.

In the late 1980s, Post-Newsweek moved its corporate offices from Washington, D.C., to space located alongside Broadcast House making the station the company's flagship. This was part of a strategy move by the Post to give its various subsidiaries their own independent identities, which worked well at first. By the mid-1990s, however, WFSB found itself in a shrinking market without any significant growth opportunities. In June 1997, Post-Newsweek traded WFSB to the Meredith Corporation in exchange for WCPX-TV (now WKMG-TV) in Orlando, Florida. The sale closed that September although the Post-Newsweek group maintained its base in Hartford until 2000, when the company relocated to its then-largest station, WDIV-TV in Detroit.

By this point, with the transfer of the AFC contract from NBC to CBS in 1998, WFSB became a direct beneficiary of what would become the Brady–Belichick era for the Patriots. Though Hartford would be disappointed when the team decided to build a new stadium in Foxborough, Massachusetts, rather than coming to Connecticut, the team's later success and a shift away from the market's longtime enthusiasm for the Giants meant that WFSB would attain successful ratings growth after four years without any NFL games. The success of the Patriots would inspire Meredith to launch a station specifically for the Springfield market to the north to allow it to benefit from the revenue of two separate stations. It also wanted to avoid preempting Patriots games in Springfield, as Connecticut straddles the traditional dividing line between the home territories for Boston and New York teams. Meredith purchased a Trinity Broadcasting Network translator in Springfield and converted it to a locally focused CBS affiliate, WSHM-LP in 2003. WSHM brands as "CBS 3" to continue to trade on WFSB's continued success and familiarity; until Gray split it off to its own channel 33 in February 2023, it shared its virtual channel number with WFSB.

In 2005, WFSB announced plans for a new, modern studio at an office park in suburban Rocky Hill, with a glass façade and lobby. It was originally intended to be built in downtown Hartford at Main and Trumbull streets, adjacent to the station's longtime home on Constitution Plaza. However, WFSB opted for a suburban location after finding that the downtown site was too small. The new studio opened in 2007.

Meredith announced on March 20, 2015, a multi-station affiliation agreement for three of Katz Broadcasting's networks, with WFSB putting Escape (now Ion Mystery) on DT2 and Laff on DT3.

On May 3, 2021, Gray Television announced its intent to purchase the Meredith Local Media division for $2.7 billion. The sale was completed on December 1. As a result, WFSB (along with WGGB and WSHM-LD) became Gray's first stations in southern New England.

On April 3, 2023, WWAX rebranded to The Wax. The Wax airs additional newscasts and sports programming not available on WFSB.

== Programming ==
=== Sports programming ===
Since 2023, WFSB and WWAX have an agreement with the University of Connecticut. WFSB airs one college football game per season featuring UConn, while WWAX airs live soccer and volleyball. In 2025, WWAX reached an agreement with the Boston Red Sox to air four spring training games.

WFSB also aired five of the six UConn Huskies men's basketball team's NCAA championship victories in 1999, 2004, 2011, 2014, and 2023.

=== News operation ===
WFSB presently broadcasts 41 1/2 hours of news per week (with 6 1/2 hours each weekday and 4 1/2 hours each on Saturdays and Sundays). WFSB has been far and away the ratings leader in the Hartford–New Haven television market for as long as it has been a CBS affiliate, with WTNH and WVIT regularly switching between a distant second and third place. In addition to its local newscasts, the station has a Sunday morning news program called CT '26 with Eric Parker at 8:30 am. During the May 2011 sweeps, the program (then known as Face the State) had ratings above that of the national Sunday shows, including NBC's Meet the Press and ABC's This Week.

On February 28, 2012, WFSB entered into a partnership with The Bulletin in which the two media properties share news footage and stories, along with WFSB providing local forecasts for the Norwich, Connecticut–based newspaper.

Currently, WFSB simulcasts its weekday morning newscast on WWAX-LD and produces four exclusive weekday newscasts for the low-power station: 7–8 am, 12:30–1, 7:30–8 and 10–10:30 pm.

==== Notable former on-air staff ====
- Dick Bertel
- Julie Bidwell (Banderas)
- Mika Brzezinski
- N. J. Burkett
- Virginia Cha
- Denise D'Ascenzo – Lead evening news anchor at WFSB from 1986 until her death in 2019, becoming the longest-serving anchor at the station and the longest-serving news anchor at any Connecticut television station.
- Jim Forbes
- Gayle King
- Ted Leitner
- Bob Neumeier
- Bill O'Reilly
- Janet Peckinpaugh
- Randall Pinkston
- Mike Randall
- Bob Steele
- Al Terzi
- Joe Tessitore
- David Ushery
- Jim Vicevich

== Technical information ==
=== Subchannels ===
The station's signal is multiplexed:

Subchannels of WFSB
Subchannel	Res.	Short name	Programming
3.1	1080i	WFSB	CBS
3.2	480i	MYSTERY	Ion Mystery
3.3	480i	LAFF	Laff
3.4	1080i	theWAX	WWAX-LD (Independent)
20.2	480i	Grit	Grit (WCCT-TV)
20.3	480i	Comet	Comet (WCCT-TV)

Simulcast of WWAX-LD1
Broadcast on behalf of another station

Subchannels of WWAX-LD
Subchannel	Res.	Short name	Programming
27.1	1080i	WWAXHD	Main WWAX-LD programming
27.2	480i	ROAR	Roar
27.3	480i	EWNNOW	Eyewitness News Now (continuous rolling news/weather)
27.4	480i	Fido	Bark TV (4:3)
27.5	480i	DEFY	Defy (4:3)
27.6	480i	WWAX365	365BLK
27.7	480i	WWAXOUT	Outlaw

With local PBS member CPTV as partner on December 1, 2008, WFSB launched Connecticut Sports Network, which covered 41 high school championships and 20 small colleges.

==== Former Fairfield County-specific feed ====
WIth Fairfield County being part of the New York City market where CBS flagship WCBS-TV is based, WFSB formerly served viewers in that county through "WFSB Fairfield County" on WFSB-DT4 and the digital tier of Optimum systems in that market, which was a semi-simulcast in standard definition of channel 3.1. The feed's main purpose outside of providing state-specific newscasts to southwestern Connecticut cable subscribers was to air alternate syndicated programming that replaced those shows on the WFSB schedule whose rights were claimed by New York stations within the county; WFSB could not offer those same shows due to syndication exclusivity rules. It also carried advertising specific to Fairfield County to provide additional revenue to the station. The last two shows requiring such accommodation moved off WFSB's schedule in 2022: Dr. Oz in January when it was ended by the syndicator when Mehmet Oz ran for the U.S. Senate in Pennsylvania, and then Live in September, when that show moved to WTNH, and Gray discontinued the channel at that time.

=== Analog-to-digital conversion ===
WFSB ended regular programming on its analog signal, over VHF channel 3, on June 12, 2009, as part of the federally mandated transition from analog to digital television. The station's digital signal remained on its pre-transition UHF channel 33, using virtual channel 3. WFSB was the only Connecticut station that participated in the "analog nightlight" program, with the analog signal remaining in operation until June 26. The sign-off included a clip of the first sign-on of WFSB when they were WTIC and it repeated itself before the actual switch occurred.
