= WPNI =

- Amherst, Massachusetts; United States
- Broadcast area: Pioneer Valley
- Frequency: 1430 kHz

Ownership
- Owner: Pamal Broadcasting; (6 Johnson Road Licenses, Inc.)

History
- First air date: April 2, 1963
- Last air date: November 30, 2013
- Former call signs: WTTT (1963–1999)
- Call sign meaning: "Public News and Information" (former format and slogan)

Technical information
- Facility ID: 25907
- Class: D
- Power: 5,000 watts daytime; 11 watts nighttime
- Transmitter coordinates: 42°21′25.3″N 72°29′11.3″W

WPNI (1430 AM) was an American radio station licensed by the Federal Communications Commission (FCC) to serve the community of Amherst, Massachusetts.

== History ==
The station was first licensed, as WTTT, on August 6, 1963. On November 1, 1999, the call letters were changed to WPNI.

In spring 2003, Pamal Broadcasting Ltd. (James Morrell, chairman/CEO) reached an agreement to acquire WPNI and WRNX from Western Massachusetts Radio Co., (Thomas G. Davis, president) for a reported sale price of $8 million. The broker for this transaction was Doug Ferber of Star Media Group, Inc. WRNX was later sold to Clear Channel Communications in 2006.

For a period of time after the purchase, WPNI was leased to the University of Massachusetts Amherst, owner of NPR member station WFCR, to provide an AM feed of the NPR News and Ideas channel. The NPR programming was moved to Clear Channel's WNNZ on April 2, 2007, through a unique agreement where UMass programmed the station, but Clear Channel retained ownership of the station and shared in the revenue stream generated by the station. (WNNZ was later sold to WFCR under the name "WFCR Foundation, Inc.")

Following the transition of the NPR programming to WNNZ, WFCR announced that WPNI would temporarily carry the programming of WUMB-FM, a folk music non-profit radio station from the University of Massachusetts Boston, while Pamal sought a buyer for the station.

In late September 2011, a tractor hit the guy wires of tower #1, causing it to collapse. WPNI filed for special temporary authority with the Federal Communications Commission (FCC) to operate "non directionally" using the remaining tower for 180 days while the second tower was replaced.

Pamal reached a deal to sell WPNI to Brian Dodge's The Love Radio Church on January 23, 2013. The sale was never completed, and was dismissed on June 25, 2014.

WPNI was taken off the air on November 30, 2013, as the station had no revenues to cover operational costs. After determining that resuming operations would not be viable, Pamal surrendered the station's license to the FCC on May 27, 2014.
