= KBLU (AM) =

News/talk radio station in Yuma, Arizona

Coordinates: 32°43′24″N 114°38′34″W

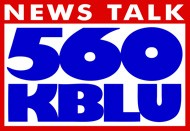
- Yuma, Arizona; United States
- Broadcast area: Yuma, Arizona/El Centro, California; Mexicali-San Luis Río Colorado
- Frequency: 560 kHz
- Branding: News Talk Radio 560

Programming
- Format: Talk
- Affiliations: Fox News Radio; Premiere Networks; Westwood One

Ownership
- Owner: Approval Coach Broadcasting LLC

History
- First air date: March 3, 1940; September 6, 1959 (KBLU)
- Former call signs: KYUM (1940–1969)

Technical information
- Licensing authority: FCC
- Facility ID: 62233
- Class: B
- Power: 1,000 watts

Links
- Public license information: Public file; LMS
- Website: www.kbluam.com

KBLU (560 AM) is a commercial AM radio station in Yuma, Arizona. It is owned by Approval Coach Broadcasting LLC and is airing a talk radio format. The transmitter is off South 20th Avenue in Yuma, at West Main Canal Road.

KBLU is powered at 1,000 watts, non-directional by day and using a directional antenna at night. With its low dial position, KBLU can be heard around much of Southwest Arizona and Southeast California, including the communities of El Centro, Brawley and Blythe. It also covers parts of Baja California and Sonora, Mexico.

KBLU is the descendant of two radio stations: KYUM, which went on the air in 1940 and moved to 560 kHz in 1951; and the original KBLU (1320 AM), which signed on in 1959; the two stations merged under KBLU's call sign and KYUM's license in 1969, with the 1320 facility donated to Arizona Western College to become KAWC.

== Programming ==
Weekday mornings began with a local news and conservative talk show hosted by Russ Clark. The rest of the weekday schedule was made up of syndicated talk shows, including Rush Limbaugh, Sean Hannity, Glenn Beck, Dave Ramsey, Clyde Lewis, Coast to Coast AM with George Noory and This Morning, America's First News with Gordon Deal. Weekends included shows on money, health, pets, law, real estate, house repair and technology. Weekend syndicated hosts included Kim Komando, Bill Handel, Leo Laporte and Bill Cunningham. Some hours were paid brokered programming. Most hours began with world and national news from Fox News Radio.

== History ==
The station is descended from two early radio stations, KYUM and KBLU, and operates on the oldest active radio license in the Yuma market.

=== KYUM ===
KYUM signed on March 3, 1940, at 1210 kHz. KYUM restored broadcasting to Yuma after the revocation of the license of KUMA forced it off the air a month prior. Twelve days after signing on, on March 15, KYUM became an affiliate of the NBC Red Network, with secondary affiliation with the NBC Blue Network (after 1945 ABC). The Yuma Broadcasting Company, 45 percent owned by KTAR radio in Phoenix, was a stockholder, and KYUM also became a link in its Arizona Broadcasting Company (later Arizona Broadcasting System) chain. It operated with 250 watts during the day and 100 watts at night. KYUM carried NBC and ABC's dramas, comedies, news, sports, soap operas, game shows and big band broadcasts during the "Golden Age of Radio".

With the enactment of the North American Regional Broadcasting Agreement (NARBA), KYUM moved to 1240 AM on March 29, 1941. In 1948, the Yuma Broadcasting Company received approval from the Federal Communications Commission (FCC) to move KYUM to 560 AM with 1,000 watts full-time; the move became effective on April 1, 1951. In 1961, KTAR bought out the remaining shareholders in Yuma Broadcasting Company, owning KYUM outright.

=== KBLU ===
Another Yuma radio station signed on September 6, 1959, as a 500-watt, daytime-only station at 1320 AM, with the call sign KBLU. It was owned by the Desert Broadcasting Company, founded by Robert Crites, who served as the first general manager. KBLU began airing a Top 40 format.

In 1963, its co-owned television station, channel 13 KBLU-TV (now KYMA-DT), signed on the air. KBLU-AM-TV were acquired by Eller Telecasting, a division of Karl Eller's outdoor advertising business, in 1967.

=== Two stations merge ===
On December 26, 1967, KTAR Broadcasting Company and Eller Outdoor Advertising Company announced their intention to merge to form Combined Communications Corporation. The merger, however, created a complication in Yuma, where Eller owned KBLU-AM-TV and KTAR owned KYUM. The FCC approved the merger in 1969 on the condition that one of the AM stations be divested. Due to a stronger signal and favorable dial position, the parent company chose to keep the 560 AM license, which became KBLU, and to donate the 1320 AM license to Arizona Western College. Arizona Western used the facility to start its own public radio station; AM 1320 took the call letters KAWC.

In 1973, KBLU founder Crites bought back KBLU-AM-TV, in a $550,000 transaction. Crites sold KBLU to Sun Country Broadcasting of Texas for $880,000 in 1983; Sun Country also bought country music station 95.1 KTTI at the same time.

KBLU and KTTI were owned by Robert Tezak, the original marketer of the card game Uno, from 1988 to 1995. That year, they were purchased out of bankruptcy by Commonwealth Broadcasting, owner of KYJT (now KQSR). In a quick succession of owners, Commonwealth was acquired by Capstar in 1997. Capstar merged with Chancellor Broadcasting to form AMFM in 1998. San Antonio-based Clear Channel Communications acquired AMFM in 1999.

=== Expanded band assignment ===
On March 17, 1997, the FCC announced that eighty-eight stations had been given permission to move to newly available "expanded band" transmitting frequencies, ranging from 1610 to 1700 kHz, with KBLU authorized to move from 560 to 1640 kHz. However, the station never procured the construction permit needed to implement the authorization, so the expanded band station was never built.

=== Later history ===
In 2005, Clear Channel sought to move the KBLU license to the Las Vegas Valley of Nevada, where it would have been licensed to serve Nellis Air Force Base. The 240-mile (390 km) move was subsequently withdrawn. Clear Channel sold its Yuma stations—KBLU, KTTI and KQSR—to El Dorado Broadcasters in 2007.

In 2017, KBLU became one of the few local stations that broadcast its content on line. In 2018, the webcast was restricted to only the Russ Clark Show, which through its Washington DC Bureau Chief, George Braun, features interviews with members of Congress, administration officials and political commentators.

El Dorado Broadcasters began winding down its Yuma operations in November 2025, when it agreed to sell KTTI and KQSR to K-Love Inc.; the deal left KBLU and six stations in Victorville, California, as the company's remaining holdings. El Dorado took KBLU silent on February 28, 2026, ahead of a scheduled mid-March completion of the KTTI–KQSR sale. Morning host Russ Clark would continue his show on social media from a different studio location.

On October 5, KBLU returned to the air with news/talk under new ownership.
