= KQSR =

Radio station in Yuma, Arizona

- Yuma, Arizona; United States
- Broadcast area: Yuma, Arizona; El Centro, California
- Frequency: 100.9 MHz
- Branding: K-Love

Programming
- Format: Contemporary Christian music

Ownership
- Owner: Educational Media Foundation; (K-LOVE, Inc)
- Sister stations: KTTI; KBLU

History
- First air date: September 5, 1986 (as KYXI)
- Former call signs: KYXI (1984–1994); KYJT (1994–2005); KQSR (2005–2023)
- Call sign meaning: "Star" (former branding)

Technical information
- Licensing authority: FCC
- Facility ID: 12660
- Class: A
- ERP: 3,000 watts
- HAAT: 80 meters (260 ft)
- Transmitter coordinates: 32.642°N 114.560°W

Links
- Public license information: Public file; LMS
- Website: klove.com

KQSR (100.9 FM) is a non-commercial radio station in Yuma, Arizona, also serving El Centro, California. The station carries a Contemporary Christian music format as K-Love. The station operates at 3,000 watts effective radiated power (ERP), making it a Class A station.

== History ==
The station used to be known as KYJT "The Jet" and aired a classic rock format. In 2005, it adopted the slogan "Star 100.9" and aired an adult contemporary format. In December 2017, after its annual Christmas music programming, KQSR relaunched as hot adult contemporary station "Mix 100.9".

On December 15, 2023, KQSR flipped to a classic rock-leaning classic hits format as "100.9 The River"; before the change, Yuma had no rock or classic hits stations, whereas the "Mix" hot adult contemporary format directly competed with similarly-formatted KLJZ. Even though KQSR was the second-ranked station in the Yuma market in Eastlan's spring 2025 ratings–trailing only sister station KTTI–El Dorado Broadcasters agreed to sell the stations to K-Love Inc. for $375,000 in November 2025; K-Love reserved the call sign KYLK for KQSR. The sale initiated a wind-down of El Dorado's Yuma operations that also saw the closure of KBLU on February 28, 2026, ahead of a planned mid-March completion of the sale.
