= KTTI =

Radio station in Yuma, Arizona

- Yuma, Arizona; United States
- Broadcast area: Yuma, Arizona
- Frequency: 95.1 MHz
- Branding: Radio Nueva Vida

Programming
- Format: Spanish Christian

Ownership
- Owner: Educational Media Foundation; (K-LOVE, Inc)
- Sister stations: KQSR

History
- First air date: November 6, 1970
- Former call signs: KALJ (1970–1978)

Technical information
- Licensing authority: FCC
- Facility ID: 62234
- Class: C2
- ERP: 50,000 watts
- HAAT: 75 meters (246 ft)

Links
- Public license information: Public file; LMS
- Website: nuevavida.com

KTTI (95.1 FM) is a radio station licensed to serve Yuma, Arizona, United States. The station is owned by Educational Media Foundation. It airs a Spanish Christian format.

== History ==
=== KALJ ===
KALJ took to the air on November 6, 1970. The station was owned by Lan-Jol Enterprises, owned by Robert Langill and Joel Pollard (the call letters stood for Arizona Lan-Jol).

=== KTTI ===
KALJ was sold and went silent on December 31, 1978, in preparation to relaunch two weeks later under new ownership as KTTI, an automated beautiful music outlet. The new owners were Purr Broadcasting, owned by former KBLU-TV/KYEL advertising manager Jim Evans and businessman Rick Richmond. KTTI flipped formats to country on October 1, 1981. Sun Country Broadcasting bought KTTI and KBLU at the same time in 1983.

KBLU and KTTI were owned by Robert Tezak, the owner of Uno, from 1988 to 1995. That year, they were purchased out of bankruptcy by Commonwealth Broadcasting, owner of KYJT (now KQSR). In a quick succession of owners, Commonwealth was acquired by Capstar in 1997, Capstar merged with Chancellor Broadcasting to form AMFM in 1998, and Clear Channel acquired AMFM in 1999. Clear Channel sold its Yuma stations to El Dorado Broadcasters in 2007. Even though KTTI and KQSR were the top two stations in the Yuma market in Eastlan's spring 2025 ratings, El Dorado Broadcasters agreed to sell the stations to K-Love Inc. for $375,000 in November 2025; KBLU was not included in the deal and was closed on February 28, 2026, ahead of a planned mid-March completion of the sale.
