= WRNX =

Radio station in Amherst, Massachusetts

- Amherst, Massachusetts; United States
- Broadcast area: Pioneer Valley
- Frequency: 100.9 MHz (HD Radio)
- Branding: Kix 100.9

Programming
- Format: Country
- Affiliations: Premiere Networks

Ownership
- Owner: iHeartMedia; (iHM Licenses, LLC)
- Sister stations: WHYN; WHYN-FM

History
- First air date: November 12, 1990
- Former call signs: WHCI (1987–1990)

Technical information
- Licensing authority: FCC
- Facility ID: 25906
- Class: A
- ERP: 870 watts
- HAAT: 211 meters (692 ft)
- Transmitter coordinates: 42°15′7.3″N 72°38′39.3″W

Links
- Public license information: Public file; LMS
- Webcast: Listen live (via iHeartRadio)
- Website: mykix1009.iheart.com

WRNX (100.9 FM) is an American radio station licensed to serve the community of Amherst, Massachusetts. The station is owned by iHeartMedia and the broadcast license is held by iHM Licenses, LLC.

The station was assigned the WRNX call letters by the Federal Communications Commission on September 21, 1990.

== Programming ==
WRNX airs a country music format. The format change to country music from WRNX's longtime adult album alternative format was part of sister station WPKX's move to the Hartford, Connecticut, market, where it became WUCS.

In addition to its usual music programming, WRNX has served as the flagship station for University of Massachusetts Amherst athletics broadcasts. The station has carried all of the school's men's basketball, hockey and football games plus coaches shows and women's basketball games since 2002.

WRNX also carries NASCAR races.

== Ownership ==
In spring 2003, Pamal Broadcasting Ltd. (James Morrell, chairman/CEO) reached an agreement to acquire WPNI and WRNX from Western Massachusetts Radio Co. (Thomas G. Davis, president), for a reported sale price of $8 million. The broker for this transaction was Doug Ferber of Star Media Group, Inc. At the time of the purchase, WRNX broadcast a rock-leaning adult album alternative music format.

In the summer of 2006, iHeartMedia, under its former name of Clear Channel Communications (John Hogan, CEO, radio), reached an agreement to acquire WRNX from Pamal Broadcasting Ltd (James Morrell, chairman/CEO) in exchange for five radio stations in other states. The other stations in the deal were WBPM and WGHQ in upstate New York, WZRT and WSYB in Rutland, Vermont, and WPYR in Baton Rouge, Louisiana. Published reports state that no cash changed hands in this transaction.

== Alumni ==
Rachel Maddow, host of The Rachel Maddow Show on MSNBC and former Air America Radio personality, got her start through a contest to find a new sidekick for The Dave in the Morning Show. Maddow says, "I was crashing with friends in Massachusetts, working odd jobs, when they told me to try out. And they hired me on the spot. Radio came to me, I didn't come to it."
