= KUMA (Arizona) =

Radio station in Arizona (1925–1940)

- Yuma, Arizona; United States
- Frequency: 1420 kHz

Ownership
- Owner: Alfred H. Schermann

History
- First air date: December 10, 1925 (as KFXY in Flagstaff); June 22, 1932 (as KUMA in Yuma)
- Last air date: February 1, 1940
- Former call signs: KFXY (1925–1932)
- Former frequencies: 1460 kHz (1925–1928)

Technical information
- Power: 100 watts

KUMA was a radio station broadcasting in Yuma, Arizona, United States. It had operated since 1925 as KFXY, based in Flagstaff, becoming KUMA and moving to Yuma in 1932. As a result of an unauthorized transfer of control of the radio station, the Federal Communications Commission ordered its license revoked in 1939 and the station off air as of February 1, 1940.

== History ==
=== KFXY in Flagstaff ===
KUMA traces its roots to the first radio station to broadcast from Flagstaff, Arizona, KFXY, which went on air December 10, 1925. KFXY operated with 25 watts from facilities backstage at the Orpheum Theater; it was put on the air by Mary M. Costigan, who was the first woman to be a licensed radio broadcaster in the state. At the time she obtained the license, national newspapers in the United States claimed that Costigan was thus the only woman known to own a radio station anywhere in the world. After being moved from its initial frequency assignment of 1460 kHz to 1420 kHz under General Order 40 in 1928, the station relocated its facilities to room 105 of the Hotel Monte Vista in 1929.

Costigan sold the station to Albert H. Schermann of Flagstaff; the license was assigned to Schermann on July 28, 1931. The sale came the same year that Costigan left town, afraid she would witness another family death after her father and brother both died in Flagstaff.

=== Long-distance move ===
On February 3, 1932, KFXY filed for a construction permit to move its facilities from Flagstaff to Yuma, a relocation spanning 243 miles (391 km). The May 31, 1932 Radio Service Bulletin announced that KFXY's call letters had been changed to KUMA, which it began using upon commencing broadcasts from Yuma on June 22.

Schermann sold an interest in KUMA to E. B. Sturdivant, the operator of movie theaters in Yuma and Somerton, in February 1934, and in June 1935, Sturdivant took outright control of the radio station. Under Sturdivant, the station commissioned a new, taller tower in 1937, built at a cost of $20,000 by D. H. Harrel of Chicago.

=== License revocation ===
On February 20, 1939, the Federal Communications Commission announced that it was revoking KUMA's license due to false statements made by Schermann in his application to renew it. The FCC claimed that Schermann—who was still the licensee—had certified that he was in control, though Sturdivant had been operating the station for five years. KUMA was ordered off the air by April 1 unless it asked for a hearing, in which case the outcome was stayed. Ahead of the July 24 hearing, Sturdivant filed to take control of the KUMA facilities itself, while the Yuma Broadcasting Company, 45 percent owned by KTAR radio of Phoenix, filed to build a station at 1210 kHz. The application from KTAR was significant, as KUMA was a supplementary member of its Arizona Broadcasting Company statewide chain. The station also suffered through the collapse of its transmitter tower in early June, causing $5,000 in damage.

The hearing was held on December 1, 1939, before FCC hearing examiner Paul Walker. At the hearing, Schermann's lawyer indicated that he was willing to relinquish the license because the station had been an unprofitable venture and the new Yuma station application, taking the KYUM call letters, had been accepted, but he requested that KUMA be allowed to remain in operation until KYUM was ready to sign on. The financial difficulties had led to Schermann suing E. B. and E. N. Sturdivant in Yuma County court that July to recover $8,000 in equipment and other property, a lawsuit Schermann won. In a newspaper advertisement that served as a notice to creditors, E. B. Sturdivant announced that he had sold his remaining interest in KUMA to Schermann effective November 11, 1939.

On January 25, 1940, the FCC announced it had upheld the revocation order and ordered KUMA off the air February 1. It additionally denied Schermann the authority to keep the station running until KYUM was ready to broadcast.

Radio service would return to Yuma the next month when the new KYUM began operations on March 3. KYUM became a dual-network NBC affiliate in addition to broadcasting the same Arizona Broadcasting Company programs formerly carried by KUMA.
