= XHMZA-FM =

Radio station in Cihuatlán, Jalisco, Mexico (Manzanillo, Colima)

XHMZA-FM / XEMZA-AM
- Cihuatlán, Jalisco; Mexico
- Broadcast area: Manzanillo, Colima
- Frequencies: 100.1 MHz; 560 kHz
- Branding: Lupe 100.1

Programming
- Format: Regional Mexican

Ownership
- Owner: Grupo Radiofónico ZER; (XEGUZ, S.A. de C.V.)

History
- First air date: 1979
- Former frequencies: 89.7 MHz (2011–2022)
- Call sign meaning: Manzanillo

Technical information
- Licensing authority: CRT
- Class: B1 (FM); B (AM)
- ERP: 10 kW
- HAAT: 643 m (2,110 ft)
- Transmitter coordinates: 19°9′21″N 104°23′50.6″W (FM); 19°11′21″N 104°36′52″W (AM); 19.098022°N 104.322809°W (emergency transmitter and studios)

Links
- Webcast: Listen live
- Website: grupozer.mx

XHMZA-FM/XEMZA-AM is a combo radio station on 100.1 FM and 560 AM in Cihuatlán, Jalisco, licensed to Manzanillo, Colima. The station is owned by Grupo Radiofónico Zer and carries a Regional Mexican format known as Lupe.

== History ==
XHMZA originally began as XEGUZ-AM in Ciudad Guzmán, Jalisco, broadcasting on 550 kHz as a 200-watt daytimer. Jorge Valdovinos López received the concession for XEMZA in September 1979. The station was sold to XEGUZ, S.A. de C.V. in 1987; the call sign was changed to XEMZA around that time period.

By the early 2000s, XEMZA was moved to 560 kHz and relocated to Cihuatlán, where its power increased to 10 kW day/1 kW night. It was now clearly targeting Manzanillo, Colima.

In 2011, it received authorization to migrate to FM as XHMZA-FM 89.7, but it was required to maintain its AM station, as communities could lose radio service were the AM station to go off the air, and in 2015 it received permission to install an emergency transmitter located in Manzanillo proper. The FM transmitter was later moved across the state line to Cerro del Toro as part of a class upgrade.

In October 2022, the Federal Telecommunications Institute (IFT) approved XHMZA-FM to change frequencies from 89.7 to 100.1 MHz, which occurred the following month. The change was intended to resolve an interference issue caused by intermodulation of XHMZA-FM and Manzanillo's XHMAC-FM 95.3 to frequencies in the 162 MHz range used by the Comisión Federal de Electricidad. The station changed formats from Sol to Lupe in 2024.
