= WMIK-FM =

Coordinates: 36.594°N 83.795°W

- Middlesboro, Kentucky; United States
- Broadcast area: Cumberland Gap
- Frequency: 92.7 MHz
- Branding: WMIK Family Christian Radio

Programming
- Format: Religious / Southern gospel
- Affiliations: Salem Radio Network

Ownership
- Owner: Gateway Broadcasting, Inc.
- Sister stations: WMIK (560 AM)

History
- First air date: 1971

Technical information
- Facility ID: 14731
- Class: A
- ERP: 350 watts
- HAAT: 410 metres (1,350 ft)

Links
- Webcast: Listen live
- Website: wmikradio.com

WMIK-FM (92.7 FM) is a religious radio station licensed to Middlesboro, Kentucky, United States. The station is owned by Gateway Broadcasting, Inc., a subsidiary of Binghamtown Baptist Church, and is a sister station of WMIK (560 AM). It broadcasts Southern gospel music and religious programming to the Cumberland Gap region and is affiliated with the Salem Radio Network.

== History ==
=== Cumberland Gap Broadcasting era (1971–1992) ===
WMIK-FM was originally owned by the Cumberland Gap Broadcasting Company, which also operated the AM station WMIK (on the air since 1948). The FM station began broadcasting in 1971 after a protracted effort to obtain a license from the Federal Communications Commission (FCC). The station initially carried an easy listening and elevator music format before switching to an oldies format in 1974. During this period, the station was affiliated at various times with the United Press International radio network and later the NBC Radio Network.

=== Religious format (1992–present) ===
In October 1992, Gateway Broadcasting Corporation, affiliated with Binghamtown Baptist Church of Middlesboro, purchased both WMIK-AM and WMIK-FM. The stations were converted to a religious format featuring Southern gospel music, syndicated preaching programs, and local programming. Programming includes nationally syndicated shows such as Turning Points with David Jeremiah, Love Worth Finding with Adrian Rogers, and locally produced programs. The station's news content is provided by the Salem Radio Network.

== Technical details ==
In March 2011, the FCC granted WMIK-FM a construction permit for a power increase. The station operates at 350 watts effective radiated power with an antenna height above average terrain of 410 metres (1,350 ft), classified as an FCC Class A facility. The transmitter is located atop White Oak Spur in Bell County, Kentucky. The station's studios are housed in a building on North 19th Street in Middlesboro that has been in use since 1948, when the original AM station began operations.
