= Fritz Beebe =

American lawyer (1914–1973)

- Born: February 20, 1914; Utica, New York, U.S.
- Died: May 1, 1973 (aged 59); New York City, U.S.
- Resting place: Sleepy Hollow Cemetery; Tarrytown, New York
- Education: Dartmouth College (B.A.); Yale Law School (J.D.)
- Occupations: Lawyer; Newspaper executive
- Employer: The Washington Post
- Spouse: Liane Petzl-Basny (m. 1939)

Frederick Sessions Beebe (February 20, 1914 – May 1, 1973) was an American lawyer and chairman of the board of The Washington Post Company.

== Early life ==
Fritz Beebe was born in Utica, New York to Harry R. Beebe, a civil engineer, and Mertice Beebe. He spent most of his early years in Utica. In 1931 he matriculated at Dartmouth College graduating in 1935 and later attended Yale Law School where he received his degree in 1938. While at Yale he was selected as an editor of The Law Journal. In May 1943 he enlisted in the U.S. Navy.

== Career ==
When The Washington Post purchased Newsweek in 1961, Beebe handled all of the details of the acquisition. After completion of the transaction Phil Graham, owner of the company, asked Beebe to accept the position of Chairman of the Board of the Washington Post Company and oversee Newsweek from New York. He accepted the offer and resigned from the law firm.

== Personal life ==
On July 20, 1939, he married Liane Petzl-Basny in New York City.

== Death ==
Beebe died on May 1, 1973, at the Columbia Presbyterian Medical Center in New York City. The cause of death was intestinal cancer. He is buried in Sleepy Hollow Cemetery near Tarrytown, New York.

== Accomplishments and recognition ==
- The Frederick Sessions Beebe '35 Professorship in the Art of Writing. Dartmouth College
- Director, member of the board of governors of the United Nations Association
- American Stock Exchange Advisory Committee
- Member of the National Industrial Conference Board
- Beebe was portrayed by actor Tracy Letts in the 2017 film The Post
