= WMIK (AM) =

Coordinates: 36°37′38″N 83°42′52″W

- Middlesboro, Kentucky; United States
- Broadcast area: Cumberland Gap
- Frequency: 560 kHz

Programming
- Format: Religious
- Affiliations: Salem Broadcasting

Ownership
- Owner: Gateway Broadcasting Corporation
- Sister stations: WMIK-FM

History
- First air date: November 14, 1948

Technical information
- Licensing authority: FCC
- Facility ID: 23335
- Class: D
- Power: 2.5 kWs daytime 88 watts nighttime

Links
- Public license information: (AM) Public file; LMS
- Website: WMIK website

WMIK in Middlesboro, Kentucky, operates on an assigned frequency of 560 kHz with a daytime power of 2500 watts. Pre-sunrise and nighttime power are 500 watts and 88 watts respectively. The landmark radio studio is on the 19th Street Extension and Highway 441. The transmitting tower is situated one mile to the Northeast.

WMIK signed on for the first time on Sunday, November 14, 1948, at 2 p.m. The Cumberland Gap Broadcasting Company, Incorporated, owned WMIK from 1948 until 1992. For many years, WMIK was the regional coverage leader, sales leader, and number one in the market for a vast majority of years as determined by the ratings company, Arbitron. The Cumberland Gap Broadcasting Company is no longer parent company of radio stations WMIK and its sister station WMIK-FM of Middlesboro, Kentucky.

The Binghamtown Baptist Church through Gateway Broadcasting Corporation purchased both stations in October 1992. Both stations continue to serve the Cumberland Gap region twenty four hours a day with a mixture of local and nationally known ministers, Southern gospel music, and local programming. The Binghamtown Baptist Church Sunday morning worship service began broadcasting in the early 1950s and is one of the nation's longest consecutively airing church broadcasts.
