= WHYN (AM) =

- Springfield, Massachusetts; United States
- Broadcast area: Pioneer Valley; Western Massachusetts
- Frequency: 560 kHz
- Branding: NewsRadio 560/98.9 FM WHYN

Programming
- Format: News/talk
- Affiliations: Fox News Radio; Compass Media Networks; Premiere Networks

Ownership
- Owner: iHeartMedia; (iHM Licenses, LLC)
- Sister stations: WHYN-FM; WRNX

History
- First air date: April 1941 (on 1400 kHz in Holyoke)
- Call sign meaning: Holyoke and Northampton

Technical information
- Licensing authority: FCC
- Facility ID: 55757
- Class: B
- Power: 5,000 watts day; 1,000 watts night
- Transmitter coordinates: 42°11′37.3″N 72°41′0.3″W
- Translator: 98.9 W255DL (Springfield)

Links
- Public license information: Public file; LMS
- Webcast: Listen live (via iHeartRadio)
- Website: whyn.iheart.com

WHYN (560 kHz; "NewsRadio 560/98.9 FM WHYN") is a commercial AM news/talk radio station licensed to Springfield, Massachusetts. It serves the Pioneer Valley area of western Massachusetts and is owned by iHeartMedia. Studios and offices are on Main Street in Springfield. The transmitter is on County Road in Southampton. WHYN operates at 5,000 watts by day, using a directional antenna, but must reduce power to 1,000 watts at night to avoid interfering with other stations on 560 kHz.

== Programming ==
Weekdays begin with a regional news and interview morning show with Jim Polito and John Baibak. That is followed by nationally syndicated talk shows including, Glenn Beck, The Financial Exchange, The Clay Travis and Buck Sexton Show, The Jesse Kelly Show, and Coast to Coast AM with George Noory. Boston-based Howie Carr is heard weekday afternoons. Weekends feature shows on finance, law, home-improvement and religion (some of which are paid brokered programming). Weekend syndicated hosts include Bill Handel, Gary Sullivan, Bill Cunningham, Joe Pags, Ric Edelman and Sean Hannity.

Most hours begin with world and national news from Fox News Radio. WHYN partners with WGGB-TV and WSHM-LD's "Western Mass News" for severe weather coverage and storm closings.

The station also carries Springfield Thunderbirds hockey games.

== History ==
=== Early years in Holyoke and Northampton ===
WHYN first signed on in April 1941, at 1400 kHz, with Holyoke, Massachusetts, as its original city of license. It was owned by the Hampden-Hampshire Corporation, whose owners also published the Holyoke Transcript-Telegram, and its 250-watt signal primarily covered Holyoke and Northampton, Massachusetts, so its call sign represented Holyoke and Northampton. In 1949, it moved to AM 560, powered at 1,000 watts, located in Holyoke. It was a network affiliate of the Mutual Broadcasting System.

WHYN added an FM sister station in 1947. That station took the call letters WHYN-FM and mostly simulcast the AM station's programming.

=== Relocating to Springfield ===
In the early 1950s, WHYN-AM-FM moved to Springfield and became affiliates of CBS Radio in 1953, dropping Mutual programming. In 1953, television station WHYN-TV Channel 55 was put on the air (today WGGB-TV Channel 40). Around 1960, WHYN-AM-FM began programming Top 40 music.

Over the years, WHYN was known as "Whyn (pronounced WIN) Radio". During the rock and roll era, some of its monikers included "Channel 56", "Radio Five-Six-Oh", "Five-Sixty W - H - Y - N", "Fun Five Sixty" and "The Big Fifty-Six". Many jingles (mainly produced by PAMS) reflected these ongoing themes. In the early 1960s, WHYN was the dominant Top 40 radio station competing with rival WSPR (1270 AM). WHYN's Top 40 sound was so popular, the station not only led in the Springfield ratings, but it was often in the top 10 in nearby Hartford, Connecticut. Some early airchecks of WHYN and its colorful disc jockeys (DJs) are at Northeast Airchecks and ReelRadio. In the 1960s, WHYN-FM ended its simulcast of AM 560 by switching to beautiful music.

=== Switch to AC and talk ===
Logo under the "NewsTalk 560" branding

WHYN continued as a Top 40 station until young listeners began switching to FM for contemporary music. Automated FM station WAQY (branded "Wacky Radio") went on the air in 1972 and took some of WHYN's audience. Jim Rising (James Marshall) was WAQY's first program director (c. 1976) after it began live programming. Rising came over from WHYN, where he had been the station's morning host, to program WAQY. He brought along WHYN's Johnny (Bekish) Michaels to be one of the DJs on WAQY.

During the 1980s, WHYN transitioned to a more adult sound, airing adult contemporary music and adding more news and sports. WHYN was the Springfield radio affiliate for the Boston Red Sox until 2007 when WVEI-FM (now WWEI) became the Red Sox home in Springfield. WHYN was also affiliated with ABC Radio. By the 1990s, WHYN was adding more talk programming and reducing its reliance on music, until it became a full-time talk station.

=== Ownership changes ===
The station has undergone several ownership changes over the years starting with the Hampden-Hampshire Corporation (a consortium of the Daily Hampshire Gazette, the Holyoke Transcript-Telegram, the Greenfield Recorder, and the Springfield Newspapers). Guy Gannett Broadcasting (no relation to the present-day Gannett Company) bought WHYN-AM-FM-TV in 1967. WHYN and WHYN-FM were sold to Affiliated Communications (the broadcast division of The Boston Globe) in 1980 while Guy Gannett retained WHYN-TV, which kept its original studio location and changed its call letters to WGGB-TV. The radio stations moved to downtown's "Marketplace" location, where their studios and offices remain, along with co-owned WRNX. R&R Broadcasting (Robinson & Reece) bought the WHYN stations in 1985. The stations were then sold to Wilks-Schwartz Broadcasting in 1987; Radio Equity Partners in 1994; and Clear Channel Communications (now iHeartMedia, the current owner) in 1996.
