= WSHM-LD =

Television station in Springfield, Massachusetts

Semi-satellite of WFSB, Hartford–New Haven, Connecticut

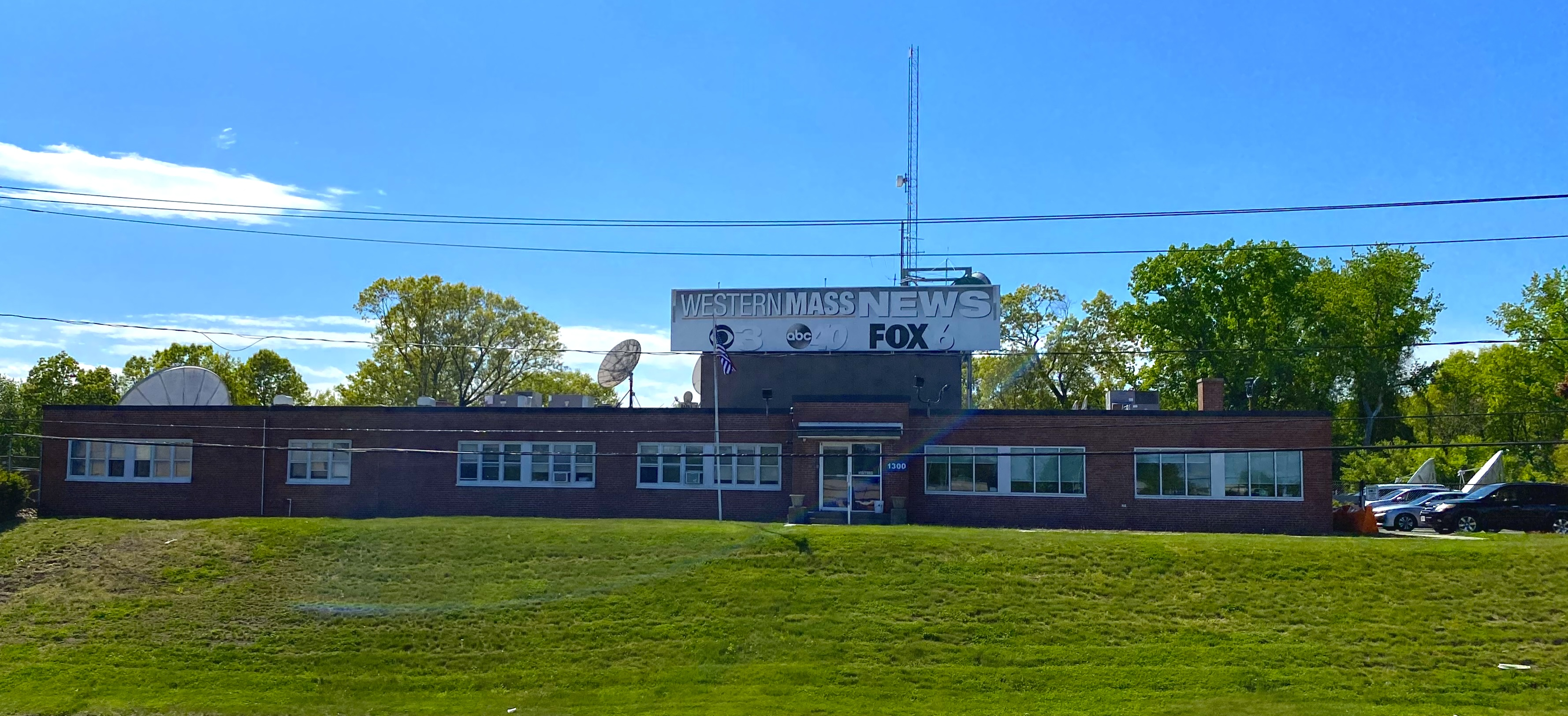
- WSHM-LD has been based out of WGGB's Liberty Heights studios since 2015.
- Springfield–Holyoke–; Northampton, Massachusetts; United States
- City: Springfield, Massachusetts (applied to move to Boston, Massachusetts)
- Channels: Digital: 20 (UHF), applied for 23 (UHF); Virtual: 33
- Branding: CBS 3; Western Mass News

Programming
- Affiliations: 33.1: CBS; for others, see § Subchannels

Ownership
- Owner: Gray Media; (Gray Television Licensee, LLC)
- Sister stations: WFSB, WGGB-TV

History
- Founded: January 22, 1988
- First air date: October 31, 1996
- Former call signs: W42AU (CP, 1988–1994); W67DF (1994–2003); WSHM-LP (2003–2011)
- Former channel numbers: Analog: 67 (UHF, 1994–2010); Digital: 21 (UHF, 2010–2019); Virtual: 3.7 (2010–2023)
- Former affiliations: TBN (1996–2003)
- Call sign meaning: Springfield–Holyoke, Massachusetts

Technical information
- Licensing authority: FCC
- Facility ID: 67980
- Class: LD
- ERP: 4.9 kW; 15 kW (application)
- HAAT: 305.4 m (1,002 ft); 191.6 m (629 ft) (application)
- Transmitter coordinates: 42°14′30″N 72°38′55″W; 42°18′37.2″N 71°14′11.7″W (application)

Links
- Public license information: LMS
- Website: www.westernmassnews.com

WSHM-LD (channel 33) is a low-power television station in Springfield, Massachusetts, United States, affiliated with CBS. It is owned by Gray Media alongside ABC/Fox/MyNetworkTV affiliate WGGB-TV (channel 40). The two stations share studios on Liberty Street in Springfield; WSHM-LD's transmitter is located on Mount Tom in Holyoke.

Although considered a separate station in its own right, WSHM-LD is operated as a semi-satellite of WFSB (channel 3) in Hartford–New Haven, Connecticut. WSHM-LD clears all network programming as provided through its parent station, but airs a separate lineup of syndicated programming, as well as separate commercial inserts and its own legal identifications. Master control and some internal operations are based at WFSB's studios on Denise D'Ascenzo Way in Rocky Hill, Connecticut.

== History ==
The station signed on as W67DF in 1996 airing a low-power analog signal, on UHF channel 67, from a transmitter on Mount Tom in Holyoke. The station served as the Pioneer Valley's over-the-air repeater of the Trinity Broadcasting Network (TBN) without any local deviation outside of station identification.

Originally, CBS was seen in the Pioneer Valley on WHYN-TV (now WGGB-TV) from 1953 until 1959. The end of WHYN's CBS affiliation came several months after WTIC-TV (now WFSB) became the network's Connecticut affiliate. Due to its strong analog signal on VHF channel 3, the station also became CBS' affiliate of record in Springfield; most cable television providers in Western Massachusetts carried WFSB once cable arrived in the Pioneer Valley in the early 1980s. Later on, WTIC-TV/WFSB would begin to purchase the syndicated territorial rights to programming for both the Hartford–New Haven and Springfield–Holyoke markets in bulk. It also blocked several attempts by WGGB to switch from ABC back to CBS.

In 2003, the Meredith Corporation (owner of WFSB since June 1997) purchased W67DF in order to set up a separate operation in the Pioneer Valley. Reasons for such a launch ranged from local advertising opportunities, to being able to assert the Pioneer Valley as a secondary New England Patriots market as the team started its two-decade Brady–Belichick era. Meredith hoped to avoid preempting Patriots games in Hartford–New Haven, since Connecticut is located on the dividing line between the traditional home territories for Boston and New York City teams, and longstanding split allegiances among area fans between the Patriots and their AFC East rivals, the New York Jets. In November of that year, the station joined CBS and adopted the call sign WSHM-LP after officially upgrading to low-power status. TBN remains available easily through all cable and satellite providers in the area.

At sign-on, WSHM immediately replaced WFSB on Pioneer Valley cable systems. The station took the on-air branding "CBS 3" based on the cable channel location. It also received permission from the Federal Communications Commission (FCC) to continue using the channel 3 position for its digital companion channel when its operations were launched, in concert with WFSB.

The channel 3 branding remained to encourage longtime WFSB viewers to stay with WSHM after the switch, and to entirely avoid the ignominy of branding with their analog allocation on a high-band UHF channel, as in technicality, WSHM's analog channel held the highest number allocation of all CBS affiliates, with WWJ-TV in Detroit's channel 62 the highest full-power channel among its full-power affiliates. Mentions of channel 67 were limited to required technical disclosures during rare technical sign-on and sign-off sequences until the end of WSHM's analog service in late 2010.

Originally, WSHM was operated out of WFSB's "Broadcast House" on Constitution Plaza in Downtown Hartford. It cleared all of WFSB's syndicated programming except for those shows already claimed by Springfield's full-power stations commercial stations, WWLP (channel 22) and future sister station WGGB. In August 2006, WSHM changed its logo from one resembling sister station KPHO-TV to a logo resembling (but unrelated to) CBS owned-and-operated KYW-TV in Philadelphia.

On May 25, 2007, WFSB's studios were flooded by a water main break. The flooding knocked out power and phone service to the building which in turn caused WFSB to go dark. WSHM's master control was also affected and the station went black for about an hour mid-afternoon and intermittently throughout the evening. There were some points during the weekend that its "CBS 3 Springfield" IDs were seen on WFSB while that outlet's IDs were seen on WSHM. On June 27, the master control and internal operations of WSHM and WFSB moved to a newly constructed facility (south of Hartford) in Rocky Hill. Since it is a low-powered station, WSHM was exempt from the FCC-mandated switch to digital-only broadcasting on or before June 12, 2009. Back on February 28, 2008, a high definition feed of this station was added to Comcast, replacing WFSB which moved to digital channel 291 and became a standard-definition feed. Charter would follow suit two years later. Meredith eventually removed WFSB from those systems due to corporate and network affiliation agreements requiring only WSHM-LD's ratings to account for CBS in the Springfield market.

On June 18, 2014, Meredith announced that it would acquire WGGB from Gormally Broadcasting, creating a duopoly with WSHM. FCC broadcast ownership rules normally forbid same-market ownership of two of the four highest-rated television stations (based on monthly total-day ratings), which often constitute stations affiliated with the four major broadcast networks. Additionally, the Springfield market has only three full-power television stations (WGGB, WWLP and PBS member station WGBY-TV [channel 57]), too few to allow a duopoly in any normal circumstance. However, the deal is permissible under FCC rules which allow common ownership of full-power and low-power television stations (the respective class designations of WGGB and WSHM) in all markets. This sale was completed on October 31, 2014. Although WSHM and WGGB initially maintained separate facilities, WSHM was eventually consolidated into WGGB's studios in May 2015.

On September 8, 2015, Media General announced that it would acquire Meredith for $2.4 billion, with the combined group to be renamed Meredith Media General once the sale was finalized. Because Media General already owned WWLP, the companies would have been required to sell either WGGB or WWLP to comply with FCC ownership rules; WSHM-LD, owing to its low-power license, was not subject to this policy. However, on January 27, 2016, Nexstar Broadcasting Group announced that it had reached an agreement to acquire Media General, resulting in the termination of Meredith's acquisition by Media General.

On May 3, 2021, Gray Television announced its intent to purchase the Meredith Local Media division for $2.7 billion. The sale was completed on December 1. As a result, WSHM-LD became a sister station to fellow CBS affiliates WCAX-TV to the north in Burlington, Vermont, and WWNY-TV in Watertown, New York.

On December 18, 2025, Gray Media filed a major modification application with the FCC, indicating that it wants to relocate WSHM-LD's transmitter 73.1 miles (117.6 km) east across the state to the combined candelabra tower site in Needham on physical channel 23. The station would change its city of license to Boston to give Gray a presence in Greater Boston.

=== WSHM-LD2 ===
In September 2010, WSHM began to carry select live UMass Minutemen sports programming on its own second subchannel, which also carried a standard loop of automated news and weather information. The subchannel converted to Cozi TV in the second quarter of 2015 as part of Meredith's carriage deal with the network across all of their stations. The subchannel is carried on Spectrum channel 183 and Xfinity's channel 293. In January 2019, WSHM-LD8 upgraded its over-the-air digital signal into 720p high definition.

== News operation ==
Western Mass News logo for the combined news operation for the WGGB ABC/Fox channels and WSHM-LD.

Initially as a semi-satellite of WFSB, WSHM did not operate a news department of its own nor did it simulcast any local newscasts from its parent. In October 2005, WSHM finally established a news operation and began producing local news from studios in Monarch Place in Downtown Springfield's Metro Center section. It was the first station in the United States to use Grass Valley's "Ignite" control room system. Originally, CBS 3 Springfield News was only seen Monday through Saturday nights at 6, Sundays at 6:30, and every night at 11.

Initially after entering the news race in the Pioneer Valley, it struggled to make a dent in the ratings of longtime market leader NBC affiliate WWLP and established runner up ABC outlet WGGB. Eventually, this station grew substantially across the board during the May 2009 sweeps period to within decimal points of WGGB in several key demographics. Compared with the area's two other commercial television stations, WSHM tended to have a flashier format in its newscasts featuring more fast-paced coverage.

Fending off a challenge by WGGB, WSHM debuted the area's first prime time newscast on August 18, 2008. Known as CBS 3 Springfield Non-Stop News at 10, the twenty-minute program aired in a commercial-free format on its then cable-exclusive local weather channel seven nights a week (the program was also streamed live on its website). The launch beat Fox affiliate WGGB-DT2 which started its own nightly prime time show at 10 on September 8. At some point in time for an unknown reason, WSHM's 10 p.m. broadcast was dropped. On August 24, 2009, it began airing a thirty-minute show on weekday afternoons called CBS 3 Springfield News First at 4. It was the first Pioneer Valley station to make such a launch. The program was expanded to sixty minutes on February 4, 2013.

In September 2010, WSHM debuted an updated local news format that contained the top stories of the day and a full weather segment shown in the first five minutes of all newscasts before a commercial break. To go along with the change, a new logo was made public and included an updated music package and graphics theme identical to WFSB. In the past during weather forecast segments, this station had been exclusively using WFSB's Doppler weather radar. Known as "Early Warning Pinpoint Doppler", this is based on top of a terminal building at Bradley International Airport in Windsor Locks, Connecticut. Eventually, live NOAA National Weather Service radar data from several regional sites began to be used interchangeably with WFSB's radar and was branded on WSHM as "Pinpoint Doppler".

Following Meredith's purchase of WGGB, the news operations of WGGB and WSHM were merged under the Western Mass News branding on April 21, 2015. The combined news operation is based out of WGGB's facilities on Liberty Street; this led to the closure of WSHM's Monarch Place studios following the April 20, 2015, newscasts. As a result of the merger, WGGB and WSHM simulcast the weeknight 6 p.m. and nightly 11 p.m. newscasts. WSHM retained its weekday afternoon local news hour from 4 until 5 which is not seen on WGGB. In addition, its partnership with the Springfield Republican and MassLive was extended to include WGGB. Also, as a result of the change, local news is now carried in high definition, an arrangement not possible when WSHM was at its previous facilities.

CBS' O&O station in Boston, WBZ-TV, shares resources with WSHM for coverage of Eastern Massachusetts and this station does the same for western areas of the state, in addition to the sharing of resources with WCVB-TV and WFXT in Boston from WGGB's existing ABC and Fox affiliations. iHeartMedia-owned radio stations WHYN (560 AM) and WHYN-FM (93.1 FM) partner with Western Mass News for severe weather coverage and winter weather storm closings. There was no regular sports segment seen during its newscasts although there was a Sunday night sports highlight show that aired after its 11 p.m. news.

Due to the arrangement of WSHM-LD, WGGB and WGGB-DT2, WSHM does not broadcast news in some timeslots, ceding to WGGB's wider viewership with its weekday morning, noon and 5 p.m. shows, and its evening weekend newscasts. Generally, the latter would be preempted by CBS Sports programming most weekend early evenings, with WGGB airing news at those times outside of the college football season. Conversely, WSHM airs Saturday night late newscasts on most of those same evenings which then repeat on WGGB immediately after the end of ABC's Saturday Night Football coverage, or other sporting event, and in the reverse it airs the 11 p.m. newscast on a delay on Sunday nights where earlier CBS Sports programming (namely NFL coverage) delays the schedule a half-hour purposefully.

== Technical information ==
=== Subchannels ===
The station's digital signal is multiplexed. From the launch of its digital signal, it numbered as a subchannel of WFSB, specifically 3.5 and later, 3.7, to avert confusion with its Hartford sister station under Meredith ownership. With the station adding digital subchannel networks independent of WFSB which would have led to its own subchannels ending up in the double digits, Gray renumbered the station as its own entity to channel 33 on February 4, 2023, though its primary channel continues to brand otherwise as "CBS 3".

Subchannels of WSHM-LD
Channel	Res.	Short name	Programming
33.1	1080i	WSHMHD	CBS
33.2	480i	WSHMD2	Cozi TV
33.3	480i	WSHMLD3	Start TV
33.4	480i	WSHMD4	Grit (4:3)
33.5	480i	WSHMD5	Ion Plus (4:3)
33.6	480i	WSHMD6	Laff (4:3)
33.7	480i	WSHMD7	365BLK (4:3)

=== Analog-to-digital conversion ===
An application filed with the FCC calling for WSHM to launch its own low-powered digital station on channel 49 was dismissed in June 2006. Another application to move the existing analog signal to channel 45 was dismissed in 2004 at the station's request. More recently, WSHM had a construction permit to air a low-powered digital signal on UHF channel 21. On November 22, 2010, this became active after WSHM finally gained a "license to cover" allowing it to turn-off its analog signal (on channel 67) and activate its own digital signal for the first time.

On January 7, 2011, to reflect the change to digital-exclusive transmission, its calls were officially changed to WSHM-LD. WFSB's digital signal continues to have good reception into southern areas of the Pioneer Valley, thus allowing access to two CBS affiliates. In the fall of 2022, a new transmitter for WSHM was activated atop Mount Tom on the WGGB tower, which now provides a solid signal for the region from north of Greenfield to north of downtown Hartford.
