= WGAI =

Radio station in Elizabeth City, North Carolina

- Elizabeth City, North Carolina; United States
- Broadcast area: Elizabeth City; Outer Banks
- Frequency: 560 kHz
- Branding: "Gospel 560"

Programming
- Format: Black Gospel
- Affiliations: East Carolina University Sports

Ownership
- Owner: George Gregory; (Gregory Communications License, Inc.)

History
- First air date: 1947
- Call sign meaning: Where Gospel Always Inspires

Technical information
- Licensing authority: FCC
- Facility ID: 72731
- Class: B
- Power: 1,000 watts daytime 500 watts nighttime
- Transmitter coordinates: 36°20′16.0″N 76°14′49.0″W

Links
- Public license information: Public file; LMS
- Webcast: , http://104.254.99.99:8000/listen.pls
- Website: http://www.gregorygospel.com, http://www.wgai560am.com

WGAI (560 kHz) is a commercial AM radio station licensed to Elizabeth City, North Carolina, serving Elizabeth City and the Outer Banks. It broadcasts a Black Gospel/Christian radio format. WGAI is owned and operated by George Gregory, through licensee Gregory Communications License, Inc.

The station's studio and offices are located in Moyock, North Carolina. The transmitter is off Lovers Lane in Elizabeth City.

== History ==
WGAI went through many formats with Top 40 in the 1960s and early 1970s, Adult Contemporary in the late 1970s, Country in the mid-1980s, and Adult Contemporary again in the late 1980s. Joy Smith, daughter of famous DJ Bob "Wolfman Jack" Smith, was briefly an afternoon DJ at WGAI in 1989 as "Joy Jack". WGAI would drop music altogether in 1994 when it began its News/Talk/Sports format. In 2015 WGAI was purchased by George Gregory. The format is Gospel and Christian Talk.
