= WGGB-TV =

Television station in Springfield, Massachusetts

- Springfield–Holyoke, Massachusetts; United States
- City: Springfield, Massachusetts
- Channels: Digital: 26 (UHF); Virtual: 40
- Branding: ABC 40; Western Mass News; Fox 6 (40.2)

Programming
- Affiliations: 40.1: ABC; 40.2: Fox/MyNetworkTV; for others, see § Subchannels

Ownership
- Owner: Gray Media; (Gray Television Licensee, LLC)
- Sister stations: WSHM-LD, WFSB

History
- First air date: April 14, 1953
- Former call signs: WHYN-TV (1953–1979)
- Former channel numbers: Analog: 55 (UHF, 1953–1957), 40 (UHF, 1957–2008); Digital: 55 (UHF, 2002–2009), 40 (UHF, 2009–2019)
- Former affiliations: CBS (1953–1959); DuMont (secondary, 1953–1956); NTA (secondary, 1956–1961)

Technical information
- Licensing authority: FCC
- Facility ID: 25682
- ERP: 345 kW
- HAAT: 320 m (1,050 ft)
- Transmitter coordinates: 42°14′30″N 72°38′55″W

Links
- Public license information: Public file; LMS
- Website: www.westernmassnews.com

WGGB-TV (channel 40) is a television station in Springfield, Massachusetts, United States, affiliated with ABC, Fox, and MyNetworkTV. It is owned by Gray Media alongside low-power CBS affiliate WSHM-LD (channel 33). The two stations share studios on Liberty Street in Springfield; WGGB-TV's transmitter is located on Mount Tom in Holyoke.

== History ==
The station signed on April 14, 1953, as WHYN-TV, broadcasting an analog signal on UHF channel 55. It was the second television station to launch in the Springfield market, debuting one month after NBC affiliate WWLP (channel 61, now on channel 22). WHYN-TV was founded by Hampden-Hampshire Corporation, the owners of WHYN radio (560 AM and 93.1 FM); the stations were in turn jointly owned by the owners of the Holyoke Transcript-Telegram and the Northampton-based Daily Hampshire Gazette. In 1954, a 50% interest in Hampden-Hampshire Corporation was purchased by the employees beneficial funds of the Springfield Republican and Daily News and the Springfield Union for $250,000.

WHYN-TV originally operated as a primary CBS affiliate with a secondary affiliation with DuMont; it lost DuMont when that network folded in 1956. During the late-1950s, it was also briefly affiliated with the NTA Film Network. It moved to channel 40 on September 30, 1957, in order to give the station a closer dial position to other UHF stations in the region. However, on November 16, 1958, WTIC-TV (channel 3, now WFSB), a station in the nearby Hartford market that had previously been an independent station, switched to CBS, prompting WHYN to petition the Federal Communications Commission (FCC) unsuccessfully for a VHF channel; in 1959, channel 40 became an ABC affiliate. WTIC-TV then became the CBS affiliate of record in Springfield; over the years, channel 3 would block several attempts by channel 40 to switch from ABC back to CBS.

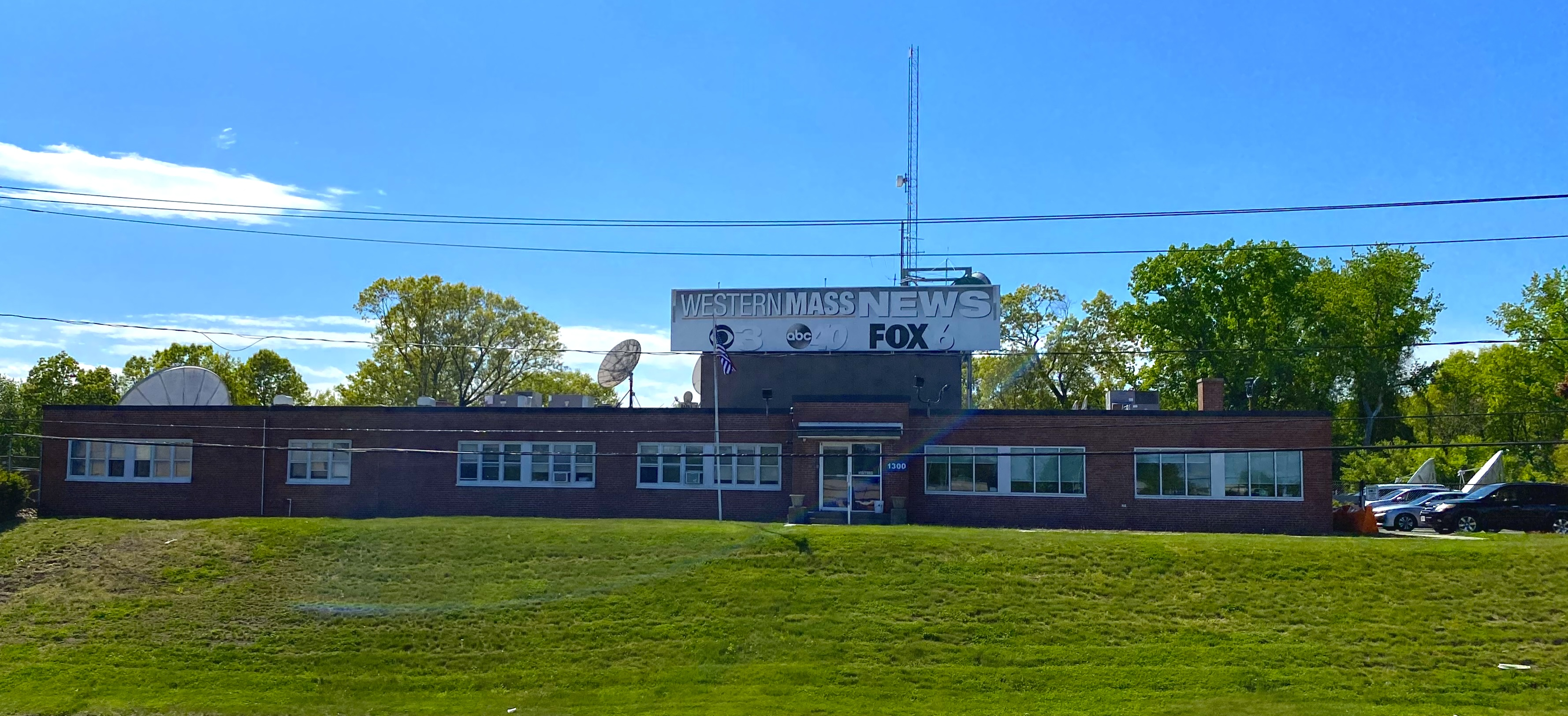
WGGB's studios on Liberty Street in the Liberty Heights section of Springfield.

Guy Gannett Broadcasting Services (not to be confused with the Gannett Company) announced in October 1966 that it would purchase the WHYN stations for $3.8 million; the acquisition was completed in 1967. The WHYN radio stations were sold off in April 1980; Guy Gannett retained WHYN-TV, and on December 31, 1979, the station took its present WGGB-TV call letters.

Most of Guy Gannett's television stations, including WGGB, were acquired by the Sinclair Broadcast Group in September 1998. In late-July 2007, Sinclair sold WGGB to locally based Gormally Broadcasting for $21.2 million. The sale closed on November 2, resulting in WGGB being the only locally owned television station in the market. In addition to WGGB, Charter systems offer fellow ABC affiliate WCVB-TV from Boston on channel 23 (Comcast does not offer such access).

On June 18, 2014, the Meredith Corporation (owner of WFSB in Hartford) announced that it would acquire WGGB creating a duopoly with low-power CBS affiliate WSHM-LD. Although FCC broadcast ownership rules normally forbid same-market ownership of two of the four highest-rated television stations (based on monthly total-day ratings), which often constitute stations affiliated with the four major broadcast networks (the Springfield market has only three full-power television stations, too few to allow a duopoly in any normal circumstance), the deal is permissible under FCC rules which allow common ownership of full-power and low-power television stations (the respective class designations of WGGB and WSHM) in all markets. The sale was completed on October 31, 2014.

On September 8, 2015, Media General announced that it would acquire Meredith for $2.4 billion, with the combined group to be renamed Meredith Media General. Because Media General already owned WWLP, the companies would have been required to sell either WGGB or WWLP to comply with FCC ownership rules. However, on January 27, 2016, Nexstar Broadcasting Group announced that it had reached an agreement to acquire Media General, resulting in the termination of Meredith's acquisition by Media General.

On May 3, 2021, Gray Television announced its intent to purchase the Meredith Local Media division for $2.7 billion. The sale was completed on December 1.

== WGGB-DT2 ==
WGGB-DT2, branded as Fox 6 for its primary cable channel slot, is the primary Fox and secondary MyNetworkTV-affiliated second digital subchannel of WGGB-TV, broadcasting in high definition on channel 40.2.

WGGB-DT2 first became active under Sinclair's ownership as part of their nationwide deal with music video network The Tube (a 24-hour digital music channel) from 2005 until the end of 2006, when multiple issues, including The Tube's refusal to add E/I programming within its national schedule, had the Tube pulled from all of Sinclair's stations; the network went dark at the end of October 2007. It never attained any cable carriage under that guise, and the subchannel was vacated for over a year.

Meanwhile, the market did not have a Fox affiliate of its own, with Springfield being the largest television market in the United States to hold this distinction. As with WFSB's CBS affiliation also encompassing Springfield, for most of Fox's first two decades, WTIC-TV in Hartford was Fox's affiliate of record for the Pioneer Valley. Depending on the location, cable companies carried either WTIC (which was available over the air in extreme southern portions of the market) or WFXT from Boston (which was owned by the network at the time), while WXXA-TV from Albany, New York was (and still is) also available over-the-air in the market's western Berkshires region. At one point, new Class A station WFXQ-CD, owned by WWLP owner LIN Media, had been rumored as attempting to affiliate with the network (hence the station's call letters).

As Fox's NFC-focused NFL coverage did not include the majority of the games of the New England Patriots outside two NFC-hosted games per year and Super Bowl appearances, and WTIC has long been part of the Patriots' television territory, it was not a priority for the network to attain a Springfield affiliate until it discontinued the Foxnet cable service in 2006, and Fox began to push for at least a subchannel presence in every television market in order to obtain profitable retransmission consent revenue from affiliate agreements arising from cable and satellite provider carriage of their channels.

On March 31, 2008, WGGB (by then locally owned by Gormally Broadcasting) officially launched WGGB-DT2 as Springfield's first in-market Fox affiliate. Almost immediately, WTIC was substituted on Comcast systems with WGGB's Fox subchannel on cable channel 6 (thus giving the subchannel its branding), and as a result, moved to the digital tier on channel 292. Charter eventually followed suit as well placing WTIC on digital channel 261. Comcast eventually removed WTIC to make way for smaller subchannel networks from local stations (including WSHM-LD's Cozi TV subchannel and WWLP-DT2 after they acquired The CW affiliation), along with Fox's preference for only a market's own Fox affiliate to be carried on a pay-TV system.

When WGGB-DT2 signed on for the second time, it also added Fox's secondary programming service MyNetworkTV as a secondary affiliation. It is seen in a delayed manner from 12:30 a.m. until 2:30 a.m. early Tuesdays through Saturdays, and de facto is fully played down. As with WTIC's drop, this saw local providers to eventually drop New Haven affiliate WCTX from their lineups. It is currently the only MyNetworkTV affiliate in the Commonwealth, as Boston's WSBK-TV (which is carried on Xfinity systems throughout the market) disaffiliated from the service in the fall of 2022.

== Programming ==
In 2004, Sinclair prohibited WGGB and its other ABC affiliates from airing a Nightline broadcast that featured a segment in which then-host Ted Koppel read the names of those who died in the Iraq War; Sinclair viewed the reading as anti-war rhetoric against the invasion. Along with 20 other ABC affiliates (including Boston's WCVB), WGGB also preempted an unedited 2004 broadcast of Saving Private Ryan, which was eventually determined not to be a violation of the FCC's indecency guidelines. Until April 2007, the station did not carry World News Now from ABC News in the early weekday morning hours, choosing instead to air programming from the Home Shopping Network and later its broadcast sub-network, America's Store, which ended operations in April 2007. Preemptions of network programming ended immediately upon Gormally's assumption of ownership, and Meredith and Gray have maintained the same hands-off policy outside rare breaking news/weather situations, such as the 2011 tornado outbreak which directly hit downtown Springfield.

=== News operation ===
Western Mass News logo for the combined news operation for the WGGB ABC/Fox channels and WSHM-LD.

WWLP has traditionally been the most watched station in the Pioneer Valley according to Nielsen ratings. However, there have been brief periods of time when WGGB was the market leader and extended periods in which the two outlets were essentially neck-and-neck with WWLP having a slight edge. Originally, WGGB's newscasts were known as NewsWatch 40. The station cut back financially under Sinclair ownership, and during that period, rumors of canceling ABC 40 News or converting to Sinclair's controversial, now-defunct centralcasting News Central format sometimes spread.

The station ultimately retained its news operation, though it did carry The Point segment of conservative political commentary from Mark Hyman which was required to be carried by all Sinclair stations with a local news operation, which was discontinued by Hyman's decision in December 2006. In fall 2006, WGGB re-hired Ed Carroll to be its chief meteorologist; he had previously been at the station from 1989 to 1993 before moving to WBZ-TV in Boston.

After becoming locally owned-and-operated, WGGB's news department underwent significant changes. Several prominent on-air personnel resigned or were laid off. The station debuted a brand new set, graphics theme, and music package on April 24, 2008. On September 8, WGGB-DT2 added a 10 p.m. newscast known as Fox 6 News at 10; this half-hour newscast originally featured a separate graphics package and music theme from the main WGGB broadcasts. Eventually, it was expanded to weekends and became known as ABC 40 First on Fox.

On February 13, 1994, a WGGB video crew taped a heated confrontation between Temple University head basketball coach John Chaney and University of Massachusetts Amherst head coach John Calipari at a post-game press conference, where at one point, Chaney had made a death threat against Calipari. The footage (which was watermarked with a digital on-screen graphic showing the station's identification) was picked up by ESPN and has since been shown thousands of times. The incident was ranked the second-biggest outburst in sports history by Fox Sports Net's The Best Damn Sports Show Period in 2006.

On April 6, 2009, WGGB's weekday morning show became a full two-hour broadcast like most other ABC affiliates. WGGB-DT2 simulcasts this program, replaying it in full during Good Morning America. Later, it was expanded to 4:30 a.m. in concert with most stations in the Northeast expanding their morning newscasts, the first to do so in the Springfield market. The station shares content with the wire services of ABC and Fox NewsEdge, and locally maintains news shares with WCVB-TV and WFXT in Boston for the eastern part of the state. With the acquisition of WSHM-LD, additional partnerships with CBS Newspath and WBZ-TV are also a part of Western Mass News' sharing agreements.

On September 14, 2011, WGGB officially became the first station in the Springfield market to upgrade local news production to high definition level (shows seen on WGGB-DT2 were included with the change). On September 15, 2014, WGGB's weekday noon newscast was expanded to an hour.

Following Meredith's purchase of WGGB, the news operations of WGGB and WSHM-LD were merged under the Western Mass News branding on April 21, 2015; the combined news operation is based out of WGGB's facilities. As a result of the merger, WGGB and WSHM simulcast the weeknight 6 p.m. and nightly 11 p.m. newscasts; in addition, WGGB inherited WSHM's partnership with the Springfield Republican and MassLive.

In delay situations where one station is carrying sports or extended entertainment programming in prime time (for instance, WGGB is carrying NBA coverage or Saturday Night Football or the CBS lineup is delayed on WSHM on Sunday nights during the NFL season), one station carries that night's newscast live, with the other station airing that same broadcast in full on a tape delay immediately after their prime time ends. On weekend early evenings, a newscast being produced is dependent on either WGGB-DT1 or WSHM carrying network sports coverage. On nights where WGGB-DT2 carries extended coverage from Fox Sports (including prime time college football, boxing, or baseball coverage), only the 11 p.m. newscast is produced and broadcast on WGGB-DT1 and WSHM, then aired delayed on WGGB-DT2 at the end of the Fox sports event.

== Technical information ==
=== Subchannels ===
WGGB-TV's transmitter is located on Mount Tom in Holyoke. The station's signal is multiplexed:

Subchannels of WGGB-TV
Channel	Res.	Short name	Programming
40.1	720p	ABC40HD	ABC
40.2	720p	FOX6-HD	Fox/MyNetworkTV
40.3	480i	CourtTV	Court TV
40.4	480i	WGGBOUT	Outlaw

=== Analog-to-digital conversion ===
WGGB-TV upgraded its over-the-air digital signal to allow the transmission of ABC network programming in high definition on October 15, 2004. The station planned to end regular programming on its analog signal, over UHF channel 40, on December 1, 2008, though it left the air a few days earlier than planned after the transmitter suffered a failure. The station also accelerated its analog closedown to facilitate the relocation of its digital channel from its pre-transition UHF channel 55, which was among the high band UHF channels (52–69) that were removed from broadcasting use as a result of the transition, to its analog-era UHF channel 40. Channel 55's spectrum was reassigned for use by Qualcomm's MediaFLO system until later being sold to AT&T Mobility for mobile service spectrum.

== See also ==
- Channel 6 branded TV stations in the United States
- Channel 26 digital TV stations in the United States
- Channel 40 virtual TV stations in the United States
