= WHYN-FM =

Radio station in Springfield, Massachusetts

- Springfield, Massachusetts; United States
- Broadcast area: Pioneer Valley; Western Massachusetts
- Frequency: 93.1 MHz (HD Radio)
- Branding: Mix 93.1

Programming
- Format: Hot adult contemporary
- Subchannels: HD2: 97.3 The Beat (urban contemporary)
- Affiliations: Premiere Networks

Ownership
- Owner: iHeartMedia; (iHM Licenses, LLC)
- Sister stations: WHYN; WRNX

History
- First air date: December 1, 1947
- Former call signs: WHFM (1985–1987)
- Call sign meaning: Holyoke and Northampton (communities originally served by WHYN (AM))

Technical information
- Licensing authority: FCC
- Facility ID: 55758
- Class: B
- ERP: 8,900 watts
- HAAT: 305 meters (1,001 ft)
- Transmitter coordinates: 42°14′28.33″N 72°38′54.32″W
- Translator: HD2: 97.3 W247DL (Westfield)

Links
- Public license information: Public file; LMS
- Webcast: Listen live (via iHeartRadio); HD2: Listen live (via iHeartRadio)
- Website: mix931.iheart.com; HD2: 973thebeat.iheart.com

WHYN-FM (93.1 MHz "Mix 93.1") is a commercial radio station licensed to Springfield, and serving the Pioneer Valley of Western Massachusetts. It airs a hot adult contemporary format and is owned by iHeartMedia, Inc. It carries several nationally syndicated shows from co-owned Premiere Networks, including On with Mario Lopez weekday evenings and American Top 40 with Ryan Seacrest on Sundays. The studios and offices are in downtown Springfield's "Marketplace" along with sister stations 560 WHYN (talk radio), and 100.9 WRNX (country music).

WHYN-FM has an effective radiated power (ERP) of 8,600 watts. The transmitter is atop Mount Tom in Holyoke, Massachusetts, more than 1,001 feet (305 meters) in height above average terrain (HAAT). The signal can be heard as far south as South Central Connecticut and as far north as Vermont and New Hampshire. WHYN-FM broadcasts using HD Radio technology. Its HD-2 digital subchannel airs an urban contemporary format known as "97.3 The Beat". It feeds 250-watt FM translator W247DL in Westfield at 97.3 MHz.

== History ==
=== Early years ===
WHYN-FM first signed on the air on December 1, 1947. The station's original city of license was Holyoke. It transmitted from a tower on Mount Tom shared with WMAS-FM in Springfield and WACE-FM in Chicopee. All three stations launched with a joint inaugural program from the Hotel Sheraton in Springfield, which was simulcast on their AM sister stations and on Springfield's incumbent FM station, WBZA-FM.

By 1953, when WHYN-TV (now WGGB-TV) signed on from Mount Tom, only WHYN-FM was still transmitting from the mountain, as WMAS-FM had moved to the WMAS (now WHLL) tower in Springfield and WACE-FM had gone dark. That same year, WHYN-FM's city of license was changed to Springfield.

=== Easy listening ===
Until the 1960s, WHYN-FM mostly simulcast the same programming as WHYN AM. By the mid-1960s, while WHYN AM was playing Top 40 hits, the FM began airing a separate format. The sound had similarities to beautiful music but primarily used vocals, was commonly known as "MOR" (middle of the road music) and was syndicated as "Format 44" around the country. The DJs played several uninterrupted songs followed by a stop-set (commercial break) and then would announce what was heard. Unlike the formats heard on AM stations in that era, the musical introductions of songs were not talked over and there was usually a little dead air between the songs, all to create an easy listening sound. The jingles used on the air were mainly lengthy cuts provided by Pepper-Tanner (now TM Studios). In 1974, WHYN-FM was the pilot station for William B. Tanner's "Easy Going" jingle series. WHYN's long-time morning team consisted of Frank Knight and news man Ron Russell (DeMatteo). A number of other radio personalities worked on the station including Dave Mack, Bob Holland (a/k/a Holland Cooke), Rich Roy (later on WHYN). Dan Williams was the longest continual employee of WHYN-AM-FM, having started in the mid-1970s when Guy Gannett Broadcasting was the owner.

WHYN-FM continued to program an easy listening format late into the 1970s. After being purchased by Affiliated Communications, the station's format was switched to adult contemporary music geared towards an 18–54 female demographic. At that point, Frank Knight and Ron Russell exited to be the morning team on Lapin Communications' WMAS for that station's "Music Of Your Life" adult standards format.

=== Soft adult contemporary ===
In the mid-1980s, WHYN and WHYN-FM were sold to R&R Broadcasting. The decision was made, by group program director Alan Anderson, to change WHYN-FM's call sign to WHFM and program a soft adult contemporary format geared not just to the Springfield media market but also the larger, more lucrative Hartford market. The IDs at the top of the hour quietly stated the Springfield city of license and the concept was that the station was "The Giant", a mythological entity broadcasting down to all the people of Southern New England.

After several months, it became obvious this approach was not working. Larry Caringer, hired by Anderson as assistant program director and morning host, was given the reins as program director. With Mary Ferrero as music director, the two fashioned a blend of rock and pop hits. Within one rating period, WHFM was number one in the 18–49 demographic. "Caringer and Friends" was the number one morning show in Springfield.

=== Change in ownership ===
In late 1987, WHFM and WHYN were sold to Wilks-Schwartz Broadcasting. The purchase involved a swap, of sorts. Federal Communications Commission (FCC) rules, at the time, did not allow multiple ownership of stations in a market. In order to sell rock-formatted WAQY, Wilks-Schwartz had to agree to change the format of WHFM to something that did not compete with WAQY. At the same time, WHFM reverted to its original WHYN-FM call sign.

Much of the air staff and other employees were fired. However, Caringer, Ferrero and Casey Palmer remained on-air. Caringer stayed on as PD through the format change, eventually giving up the position when it became obvious he was no longer making management decisions, but simply an order taker from the consultant in Seattle. "Caringer and Friends" newscaster Bill Hess took the PD position. Several weeks later, Hess fired Caringer – and took over the morning show. (Caringer had just been voted "Most Popular Radio Personality" by The Valley Advocate.) Ann Strong did mid-days and Casey Palmer was the afternoon jock. Evening DJ Mary Ferrero, who lost her position to Strong, exited to become the production director at WMAS-AM-FM and Jennifer Fox took her place on WHYN-FM.

WHYN and WHYN-FM were later sold by Wilks-Schwartz to Radio Equity Partners who later sold to Clear Channel Communications (now iHeartMedia) in 1996. The station hired newscaster Tony Gill, who had worked in the Boston market at radio stations WBZ and WRKO. He served as special assistant to Mayor Ray Flynn's communications office. While at WHYN, Gill was hired by WTIC-TV as a general assignment reporter.

=== Hot adult contemporary ===
WHYN-FM for many years was known as "93WHYN" and was an adult contemporary station that also blended oldies from the 1950s and 1960s in its playlist. The station also aired "Jukebox Saturday Night", a program DJ Frank Holler started on WDRC-FM, along with an oldies show with Phil D-e-e (Drumheller), which initially aired on Fridays, then moving to Saturdays after the departure of Frank Holler in 1997. The program was moved to WHYN AM in 1999. The station began evolving into a "hot adult contemporary" format by the late 1990s, and in 2000, WHYN-FM was rebranded as a "Mix" station similar to Clear Channel's other "Mix" stations across the nation.

WHYN-FM was home to the Dan (Williams) and Kim (Zachary) morning show. They were heard on Springfield radio for more than 15 years before the two were let go in late 2011. The Dan and Kim morning show originally began on WHYN AM in 1995 before switching over to WHYN-FM in 1997. Dan had gone through a series of morning co-hosts following some ownership and program director changes. Kim replaced Bo Sullivan as Dan's co-host and the show improved in the ratings almost immediately. Evenings were being "voice tracked" by Jennifer Fox (who was working at Clear Channel in Vermont). Due to budget constraints, the station fired her in late 2006 and was replaced by the syndicated John Tesh show at night. Evenings now feature the syndicated On with Mario Lopez.

== Translator ==
Call sign	Frequency	City of license	FID	ERP (W)	HAAT	Class	Transmitter coordinates	FCC info	Notes
W247DL	97.3 FM	Westfield, Massachusetts	144790	250	−83 m (−272 ft)	D	42°5′5″N 72°42′12″W	LMS	Relays WHYN-FM HD2 ("97.3 The Beat")
