= List of tallest buildings in Springfield, Massachusetts =

Coordinates: 42°6′6.7″N 72°35′21.0″W

Springfield, Massachusetts, United States, features relatively few skyscrapers compared its peer cities, due to a 1908 Massachusetts state law limiting the city's building height to 125', which remained in effect until 1970. In 1907-08, the construction of 1200 Main Street caused such an outcry in both Springfield and Boston that the Massachusetts State Legislature passed a law limiting commercial building height in Springfield to 125' – the height of the steeple of Springfield's Old First Church (the fourth incarnation of which had been constructed in 1819). As a consequence, Springfield did not develop a modern skyline in the pre-World War II styles of art deco or neo-classicism; however, many 'human-scale' versions of both styles exist in Springfield.

Springfield's height limit was broached purposely in 1970, after the U.S. government had closed the Springfield Armory and many residents began to complain that Springfield looked too Victorian, architecturally. The Baystate West tower (now known as Tower Square, bearing MassMutual's name), standing 371', was designed that year in the brutalist International style by renowned architect Pietro Belluschi. Several major downtown projects followed in the 1970s and 1980s, creating an impressive modern skyline accented by the Campanile tower of 1913 (the one building which was allowed to breach the height law imposed on Springfield by Massachusetts).

Tall Buildings in Springfield

L to R: Tower Square,
Monarch Place,
and the Campanile tower

Skyline of Springfield from the Connecticut River

== Tallest buildings ==
Tallest buildings and structures in Springfield, Massachusetts
Rank	Name	Image	Height	Floors	Use	Built
1	Monarch Place		401 ft	26	Commercial office	1987
2	Tower Square		371 ft	29	Commercial office	1970
3	Springfield Municipal Group Campanile		300 ft	n/a	Campanile	1913
4	Chestnut Park		289 ft	34	Apartment building	1977
5	One Financial Plaza		230 ft	17	Commercial office	1983
6	Chestnut Park		207 ft	17	Apartment building	1976
7	Linden Towers		183 ft	15	Apartment building	
8	Springfield Marriot		183 ft.	15		
9	Bay State Place-East		158 ft.	13		
10	Tri-Towers Tower 1		158 ft.	13		
11	Tri-Towers Tower 2		158 ft.	13		
12	Bay State Place-West		146 ft.	12		
13	Tri-Towers 3		146 ft.	12		
14	Laquinta Hotel		146 ft.	12		
15	Sheraton Monarch		146 ft.	12		
16	TD Bank Center		146 ft.	12		
17	295 Worthington Street	Upload image	142 ft	8	Commercial office	1926
18	1200 Main Street	Upload image	125 ft	12	Commercial office	1907-08
19	95 State Street	Upload image	125 ft	10	Commercial office	1930
20	People's Bank	Upload image	125 ft	10	Bank	1915
21	Old First Church at Court Square		125 ft	n/a	Church	1816

== See also ==
- Springfield Municipal Group
- Hotel Kimball
- Springfield Memorial Bridge
- List of tallest buildings in Boston
- List of tallest buildings in Cambridge, Massachusetts
- List of tallest buildings in Worcester, Massachusetts
- List of tallest buildings in Massachusetts, exclusive of Boston
