= Springfield District Court =

Historic courthouse in Massachusetts, United States

- U.S. National Register of Historic Places
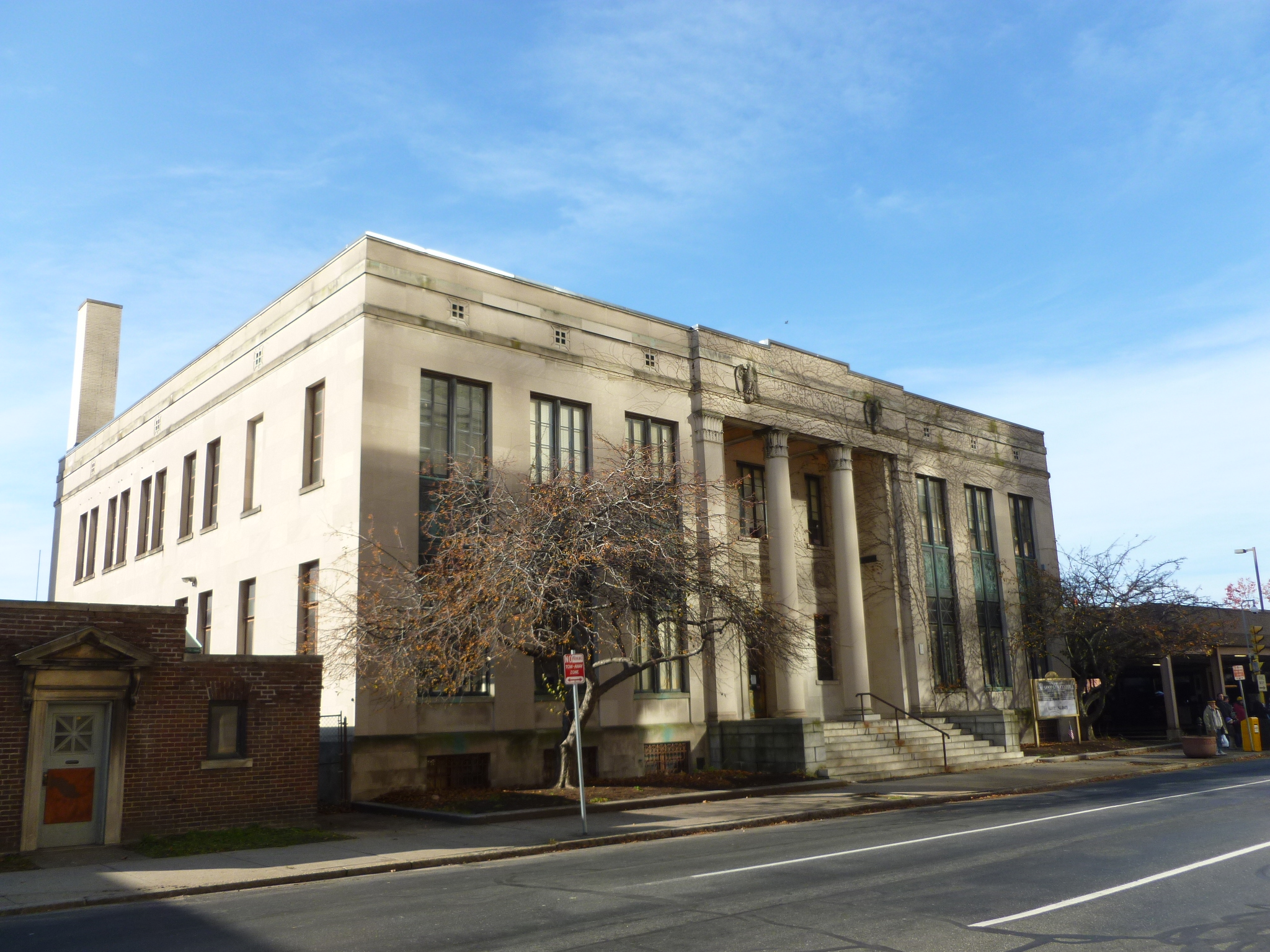
- Former Springfield District Court building

- Location within Massachusetts Location within the United States
- Location: 1600 E. Columbus Ave., Springfield, Massachusetts
- Coordinates: 42°6′3″N 72°35′29″W
- Area: less than one acre
- Built: 1930
- Architect: E. C. & G. C. Gardner
- Architectural style: Classical Revival
- MPS: Downtown Springfield MRA
- NRHP reference No.: 83000765
- Added to NRHP: February 24, 1983

The Springfield District Court, presently known as the City Hall Annex, is a historic former courthouse located at 1600 East Columbus Avenue in Springfield, Massachusetts. Constructed between 1929 and 1930 in a civic Classical Revival style, the building was designed by architects E. C. & G. C. Gardner. Originally built as a county courthouse, the structure fulfilled judicial functions until the 1970s. Following its closure as a courthouse, the building was repurposed by the city to accommodate additional municipal government offices. The building was listed on the National Register of Historic Places on February 24, 1983.

== Description and history ==
The former Springfield District Court building is located in downtown Springfield, just west of the Municipal Group of institutional buildings where City Hall is located. It faces east onto East Columbus Avenue, which separates it from that cluster of buildings. It is a two-story structure, built out of steel and concrete faced in limestone, with Classical Revival styling. Its main facade is nine bays wide, with the center three projecting slightly and housing the main entrance area. The entrances are recessed behind two massive columns placed in antis within the recess, and the opening is flanked by pilasters. The outer bays of the facade have large multi-section windows, separated between floors by decorative metal panels.

The building was constructed beginning in 1929 to replace the previous police court, which was outgrowing its quarters. The new building served as a district court facility, housing a diversity of court needs for Springfield and surrounding communities. It was connected to other facilities by a tunnel (through which female prisoners were transported) and by a bridge called the "Bridge of Sighs" because it was where male prisoners were transported. It continued in that use until the 1970s, when a new courthouse was built at Court Square. It was then turned over to the city, which has used it for municipal offices since.

== See also ==
- National Register of Historic Places listings in Springfield, Massachusetts
- National Register of Historic Places listings in Hampden County, Massachusetts
