= List of tallest buildings in Massachusetts =

The list of tallest buildings in Massachusetts is divided into two lists:

- List of tallest buildings in Boston
- List of tallest buildings in Massachusetts outside of Boston

Note: Many of the tallest buildings in the U.S. state of Massachusetts are located in its capital, Boston.

There is also:

- List of tallest buildings in Cambridge, Massachusetts
- List of tallest buildings in Springfield, Massachusetts
- List of tallest buildings in Worcester, Massachusetts
