= Metro Center, Springfield, Massachusetts =

Human settlement in Massachusetts, United States

Coordinates: 42.106°N 72.587°W

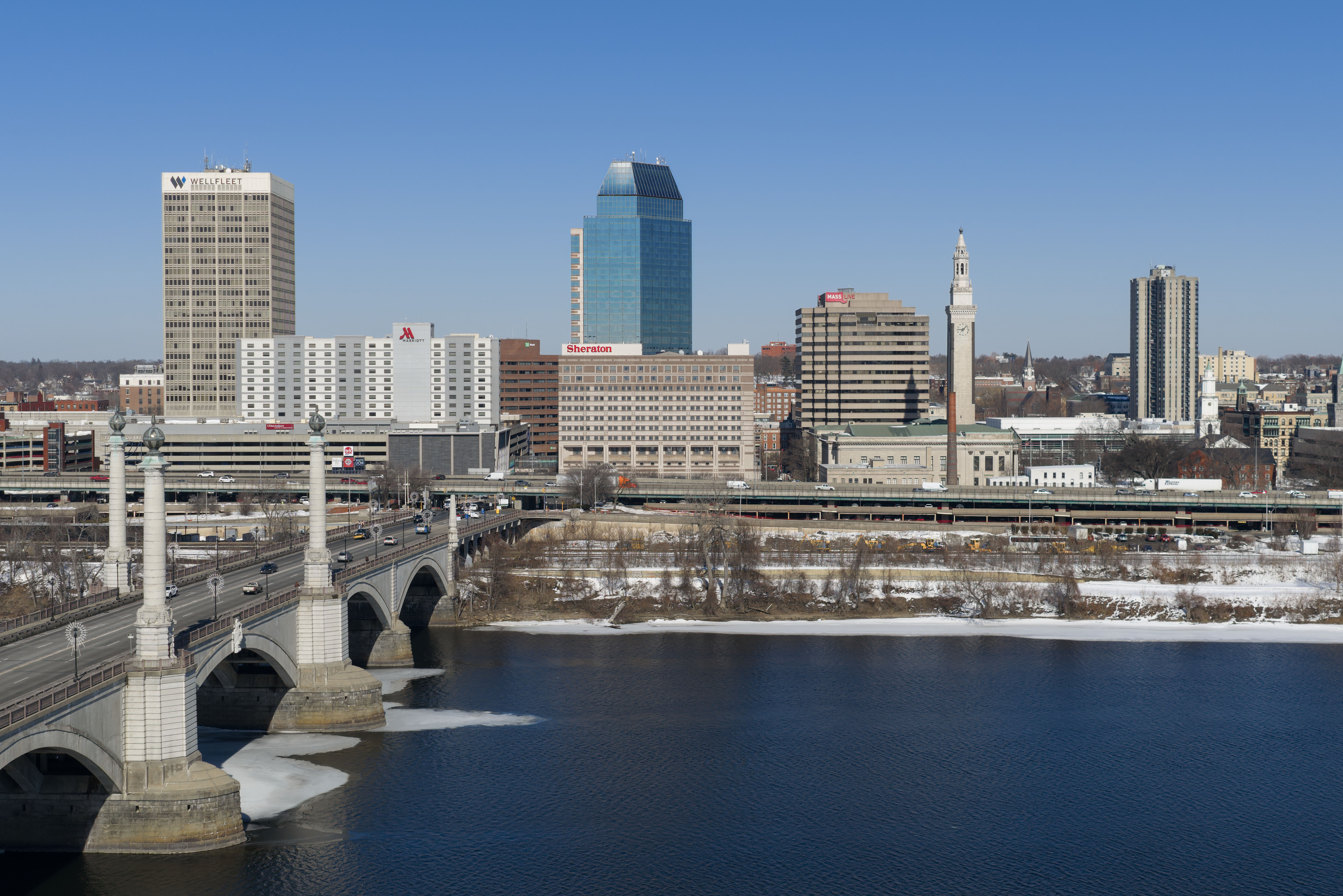
Springfield's characteristic skyline with Monarch Place and Tower Square comprises the largest buildings in Metro Center.

Metro Center is the original colonial settlement of Springfield, Massachusetts, United States, located beside a bend in the Connecticut River. As of 2019, Metro Center features a majority of Western Massachusetts' most important cultural, business, and civic venues. Metro Center includes Springfield's Central Business District, its Club Quarter, its government center, its convention headquarters, and in recent years, it has become an increasingly popular residential district, especially among young professionals, empty-nesters, and creative types, with a population of approximately 7,000 (2010.)

Metro Center is physically separated from the Connecticut River by Interstate 91 – a 1958 urban renewal project that separated the city from its riverfront.

== Early history ==
It is difficult to estimate the origins of human habitation in the Connecticut River Valley, but there are physical signs dating back at least 9,000 years. Various sites indicate millennia of fishing, horticulture, beaver-hunting, and burials. The region was inhabited by several Algonkian-speaking Native American communities, culturally connected but distinguished by the place names they assigned to their respective communities: Agawam (low land), Woronco (in a circular way), Nonotuck (in the midst of the river), Pocumtuck (narrow, swift river), and Sokoki (separated from their neighbors). The modern-day Springfield metropolitan area was inhabited by the Agawam Indians. The Agawam, as well as other groups, belong to the larger cultural category of Alongkian Indians.

In 1634, a devastating plague, probably smallpox, reduced the Native American population of the Connecticut River Valley to a tiny percentage of its previous size. Governor Bradford of Massachusetts writes that in Windsor (notably the site of a trade post, where European diseases often spread to Native populations), "of 1,000 of [the Indians] 150 of them died." With so many dead, "rot[ting] above ground for want of burial," English colonists were emboldened to attempt significant settlement of the region.

Metro Center, purchased from the Native people of Agawam in 1636 by William Pynchon and a group of pioneers, was originally called Agawam Plantation. Eighteen Agawam Indians signed on to the deed, which was witnessed and negotiated with the help of a translator from the East named Ahaughton.

At the time of its founding, Agawam Plantation was the northernmost settlement on the Connecticut River, and belonged to the Connecticut Colony as opposed to the Massachusetts Bay Colony, to which it would later belong. Within less than a decade after its founding in 1636, differences arose between the leaders of Agawam (Springfield) and Newtown (Hartford) over how to relate with the region's Native population. Springfield hoped to pursue peaceful relations with the Natives so as to better facilitate trade and communal farming, whereas Hartford – and many of Connecticut's early settlers – had fought the bloody Pequot War to claim their territory, and thus took a more militant view. This difference of opinion led to Agawam (Springfield) annexing itself to Massachusetts in 1640. At that time, William Pynchon was named magistrate of the settlement, and the town's name was changed to Springfield in Pynchon's honor. (Pynchon was from Springfield, Essex.)

Metro Center Springfield was founded on the Connecticut River, just north of the River's first falls unnavigable by seagoing vessels, (the Enfield Falls.) Thus, in founding Springfield, the business-minded Pynchon assured that all northern river trade and travel ran through Springfield. In early colonial days, Springfield was the dominant trading post on the Connecticut River. Pynchon and his fellow colonists profited immensely from fur trade with the Agawam Indians, but also used a variety of tactics - from debt to alcohol - to take more and more land until the Agawam were contained to a walled village atop Long Hill. This was a rapid cycle: Native people relied on trading seasonal goods such as furs, so they took out mortgages with land as collateral. The demand for furs led to overhunting, which forced Native people to default and allowed for the colonists to acquire more Native land. Having lost their fields, the rapid overexploitation of the fur trade continued.

In 1675, during King Philip's War, the colonists of Western Massachusetts resorted to extraordinary measures, including the taking of arms and hostages, to weaken and preclude a threat from Native people. However, the Agawams and others still attempted the Attack on Springfield, which burned over 75% of Springfield, which was only Metro Center, including the saw and grist mills. Following the war, thought was given to abandoning the settlement entirely.

In 1777, noting Springfield's location on a major U.S. river, fertile farmland, and close proximity to Boston, Albany, New York City, and Montreal, George Washington and Henry Knox founded the U.S. National Arsenal at Springfield on a tall bluff overlooking Metro Center. Subsequently, Springfield developed neighborhoods other than Metro Center.

In 1813, the green in the middle of Metro Center was officially named Court Square. Court Square had been the center of public and social life since the times when Native Americans roamed freely through Springfield's streets (pre-King Philip's War,) and continued to be so until the building of Springfield's first train station in the 1830s.

The arrival of the railroad to Springfield in the 1830s brought great wealth to the city, again, due to its location. Goods from New York, Boston, Chicago, and even as far west as San Francisco travelled through Springfield on their ways to coastal distribution centers. Springfield, rather than Hartford, or Northampton, or Greenfield, became Western New England's railroad hub, perhaps due to the presence of the Springfield Armory, but more likely due to the city's growing reputation for ingenuity, and that it served as a nearly equidistant point between Albany and Boston, Providence, and New York.

== Culture ==
Metro Center features the majority of Western Massachusetts' most important cultural institutions. For example, it features the Springfield Armory National Park, which includes a museum featuring the world's largest historic firearm collection. A block west of the Armory is the Quadrangle, which includes an extraordinary grouping of world-class and regional museums, each with a different focus. The Quadrangle features the George Walter Vincent Smith Museum, which is known worldwide for having the largest collection of Chinese cloisonné outside of China. It also features the Museum of Fine Arts, which features a particularly strong European Impressionist and Post-Impressionist collection, including paintings by Monet, Degas, and Gauguin, among others. The American Collection features works by Springfielder James McNeill Whistler. The Springfield Science Museum features the first-ever American planetarium (built 1937,) Dinosaur Hall, and a live animal center. The Quadrangle's two regional museums are the Connecticut River Valley History Museum, the most extensive compilation of information on the historic valley and its people; and the new Wood Museum of Springfield History, which showcases Springfield as The City of Firsts in the context of American History.

=== Live entertainment near Court Square ===
Springfield Symphony Hall at Court Square features famously "perfect acoustics," and frequent performances by the innovative Springfield Symphony Orchestra. It also features traveling performances of Broadway shows. Also, close by, the Community Music School of Springfield, located at 127 State Street, features musical programs during the day and evenings. Across the street, the MassMutual Center features arena-scale rock concerts, conventions, and is home to Springfield's professional sports team, the American Hockey League's Springfield Thunderbirds.

Within close walking distance are Rascal's, a comedy club at 1 Monarch Place, and Springfield's famous City Stage playhouse – a tiny modern playhouse that produces a range of works from philosophical modern plays, to Shakespeare, to children's entertainment.

=== The Club Quarter ===
The area surrounding Stearns Square has been Springfield' Club Quarter for over 120 years. As of 2011, Springfield's Club Quarter continues to expand, now featuring over 70 clubs, bars, restaurants, and even historic gathering places such as Smith's Billiards, The Student Prince, both extant since the early 20th century. For an example of the latter, the Duryea brothers built the first American gasoline-powered car at a still existent building on Taylor Street – one of the few buildings in the district at that time, which was not a bar or club. An 1893 model Duryea stands in a small park outside of what is today Alumni Club at 90 Worthington Street, mere feet from the historically important Duryea shop. Springfield's most popular bars and clubs are an eclectic mix, featuring many different "scenes" which co-mingle peaceably, including hip-hop, rock, LGBT, jazz, strip clubs for both men and women, and blues. The restaurants and clubs by the Basketball Hall of Fame also feature live music, Las Vegas-style shows and several sports bars.

=== Urban fabric ===
Even by urban New England standards, where downtowns are frequently walkable like those in Europe, Springfield's is exceptionally so. It is composed of mixed-use residential, commercial, and institutional organizations. A majority of its buildings were built in the late 1800s and early 1900s, giving it a Victorian look; however, there are numerous skyscrapers as well. Metro Center is cut off from the Connecticut Riverfront by Interstate 91, an 8-lane highway. Across Interstate 91 sits the Basketball Hall of Fame complex, Springfield's largest tourist draw.

==== Legislature skyline height limit ====
From 1908 until 1971, Springfield was subject to a skyline height limit – imposed by the Massachusetts State Legislature – of 125 feet, and thus Springfield has a relatively lower skyline than comparable cities of its population and economic and cultural importance. This trait is now looked on as a positive by developers at the Urban Land Institute, who have written "Metro Center now stands out from its peers, most of which long ago demolished the human-scale architecture that made their downtowns livable." During Springfield's resurgence in the new millennium, prominent architects – like Moshe Safdie, who built the $57 million, 2008 U.S. Federal Court Building; Gwathmey Siegel & Associates, who built the $47 million, 2004 Basketball Hall of Fame; and TRO Jung Brannen, who are building the $110 million, 2012 adaptive reuse of Springfield's original Technical High School – adapted to Springfield's human-scale to create monumental buildings rather than attempting to "achieve monumentalism through over-scaling," as has happened in other cities.

==== Transportation ====
In 2012, Springfield's 1926 Union Station will receive a $75 million renovation (including $4 million pledged by Connecticut) to become an intermodal transportation center, with Peter Pan Bus' headquarters, PVTA's headquarters, and Greyhound all relocating to the new facility. This project will coincide with the start-up of Springfield's two new rail lines: the $1 billion, southbound Springfield Hartford New Haven rail line, which will reportedly reach speeds up to 110 mph, making it the United States' first true "high-speed" train; and the $80 million, northbound Knowledge Corridor Intercity Commuter Rail, which will connect Springfield with its northern neighbors along the Connecticut River (e.g. Northampton, Massachusetts) and terminate in Brattleboro, Vermont. Ultimately, this renovation of the old Montrealer line will take passengers to Montreal, Quebec, Canada.

While billions of dollars are funding Springfield's north–south rail expansion, a more modest, combined $25 million recently improved Springfield's two main thoroughfares, Main Street and State Street. Both now feature artistic crosswalks and ornate streetlights, which add to the eclectic and increasingly whimsical atmosphere of Metro Center. The 2011 Greater Springfield tornado reversed much of Main Street's progress.

==== Interstate 91's placement inhibiting economic growth ====
Metro Center provides quick access to I-91 and I-291, both of which connect to I-90 (the Massachusetts Turnpike), making trips to Boston, Albany, New York City, Montreal, Hartford, Worcester, and New Haven convenient by car. This convenience, however, came at a steep price to Springfielders: hasty, poor urban planning decisions during 1958 created the now elevated I-91 viaduct along the Connecticut River, which essentially cut off Springfield from the Connecticut, the parks surrounding it, and the Basketball Hall of Fame complex, preventing foot traffic and resulting in untold losses of tourist dollars among other losses. In 2010, Boston's Urban Land Institute proposed a vision for Springfield's riverfront; however, as of 2011, Interstate 91 remains a physical barrier between Springfield, the Connecticut River, and the Basketball Hall of Fame.

The position of I-91 and its blockage of the Connecticut River – along with the cement covering of the Mill River – are challenges that Springfield officials say they plan on addressing in upcoming years.

Recent academic papers have documented negative economic and sociological effects of I-91's placement in Springfield – it has fragmented three neighborhoods, inhibited the economic growth of Springfield's most valuable land – on the Riverfront and around the Basketball Hall of Fame – and essentially made the river inaccessible to people as a place for recreation and tourism. Recent city planning polls rate Springfield's I-91 among the worst urban planning decisions made by an American city. The highway's inhibiting effects on riverfront development were exacerbated during the 1980s and 1990s, when giant, above-grade highway parking lots were built underneath I-91, and later when earthen, grassy mounds and 20-foot limestone walls were constructed around large sections of it, blocking all but the tallest Metro Center buildings' views of the Connecticut River, and discouraging economic and social interaction between Metro Center and the Basketball Hall of Fame.

== Buildings ==
=== Residential real estate ===
Metro Center's housing stock was, for centuries, Springfield's most prized. As of 2011, it is fast regaining that status among people attracted to urban living without the expense – bohemians, artists, empty-nesters, and LGBT residents have constituted the first wave of Metro Center's recolonization, which began only during the new millennium. Housing stock consists of various architectural styles, from detached Victorian houses and attached red-brick row-houses in the Quadrangle-Mattoon Street Historic District, to historic buildings adaptively re-used or renovated into condominiums, artists' lofts, and rental properties in the Apremont Triangle Historic District. Notable examples include a former 4-star Sheraton hotel, (The Kimball Towers;) a famous, Victorian high school (Classical High School Condominiums;) an architecturally significant factory (The McIntosh;) and a renovated art deco apartment building, (Pearl Street Luxury Condos.) Rental properties include the adaptive re-use of the former Milton Bradley toy factory, now called Stockbridge Court, as well as the adaptive re-use of the former YMCA building, 122 Chestnut Street. Major construction projects like the $101 million adaptive re-use of Springfield's original Technical High School for Massachusetts' Data Center; the $57 million Moshe Safdie-designed, architecturally award-winning Federal Courthouse; and Baystate Health's $300 million "Hospital of the Future," have all contributed to Metro Center's resurgence.

The Quadrangle-Mattoon Street Historic District is one of the few neighborhoods in the Knowledge Corridor that remains lined with historic, restored red-brick Victorian row houses on both sides, and shaded by tree canopies. The Mattoon Street neighborhood features some of Springfield's most prestigious residential addresses, on Mattoon Street, Salem Street, Elliot Street, and others. It also features one of renowned architect H.H. Richardson's first works in the Richardsonian Romanesque style, the current Hispanic Baptist Church. Early each Fall, the neighborhood hosts a large arts festival, "The Mattoon Street Arts Festival."

=== Civic ===
Metro Center features Springfield's and Western Massachusetts' most prominent civic institutions, including the Greek Revival Springfield City Hall, the Springfield School Board, the Hampden County Courthouse and Richardsonian Romanesque Juvenile Courthouse, designed by H.H. Richardson himself. Springfield's ornate, neo-classical Springfield Municipal Group, dedicated by U.S. President William Howard Taft, features a 300 ft. tall Italianate campanile that towers over Court Square. Other prominent civic buildings include "starchitect" Moshe Safdie's new, $57 million, architecturally award-winning Federal Courthouse on State Street, and Massachusetts' new $110 million Data Center, an adaptive re-use of Springfield's original Technical High School. The Springfield School Board recently moved into modern, $11 million renovated office space 1550 Main Street.

=== Libraries, colleges, and universities ===
The City of Springfield's palatial Public Library is located in Metro Center. It features the second largest library circulation in New England (behind Boston's). Metro Center also features three higher learning institutions: Cambridge College at Tower Square, the University of Massachusetts Amherst's Urban Design Center at Court Square, and Springfield Technical Community College, which enrolls over 6500 students.

=== Corporate and professional ===
Metro Center is the central business district of Western Massachusetts, featuring numerous international, national, regional, and local businesses and headquarters. 17,000 businesspeople work in Metro Center. Businesses include the Fortune 100 MassMutual Financial, Peter Pan Bus, Hampden Bank, NuVo Bank, Merriam Webster, Liberty Mutual, Verizon, the American Hockey League, the Northeastern headquarters of TD Banknorth, Health New England, Peoples' United Bank, United Personnel staffing, numerous attorneys, architects, accountants, other professionals, and hundreds of businesses. As of May 2011, Metro Center also features the headquarters of Massachusetts' third largest company, Baystate Health.

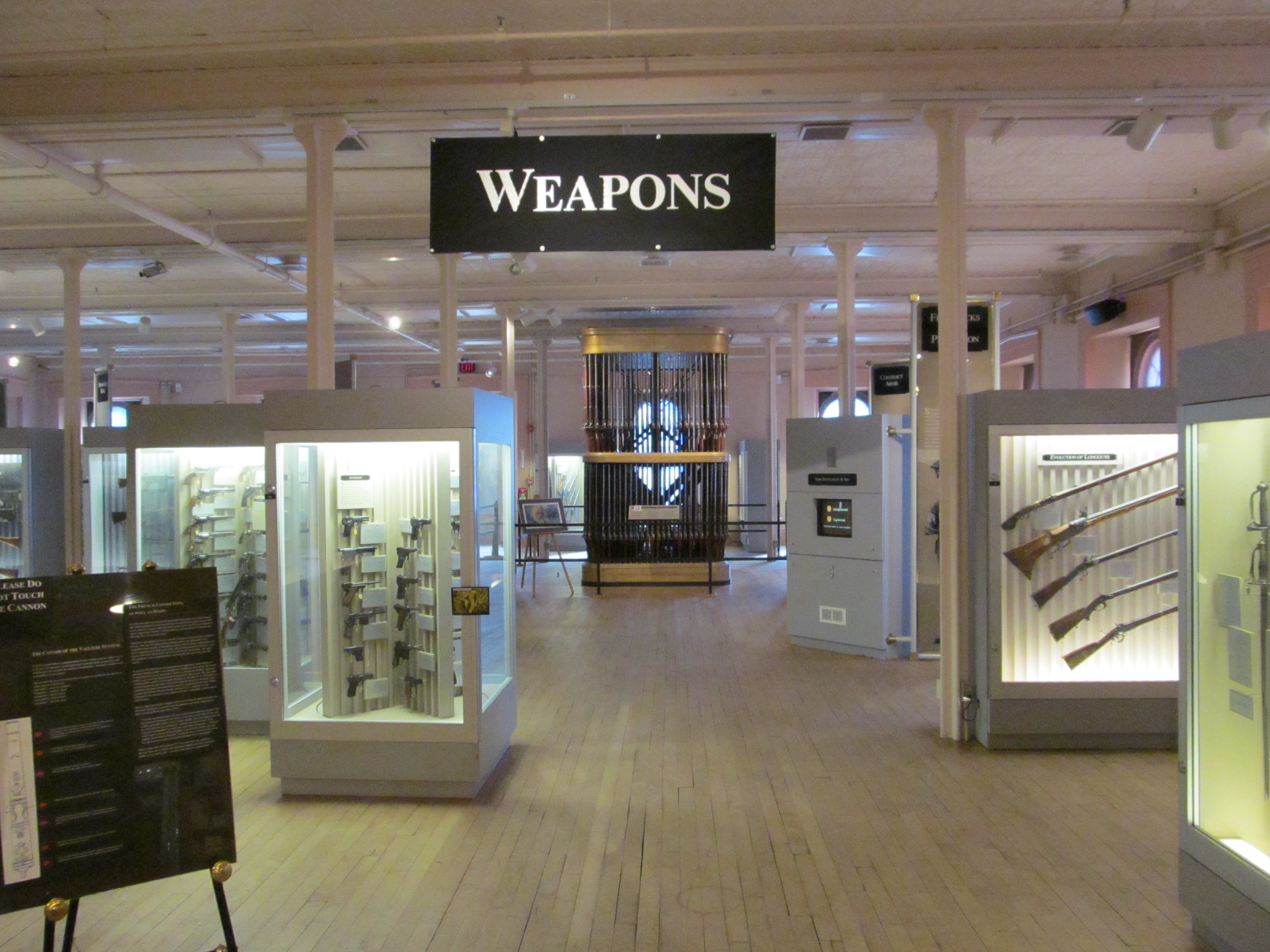
Springfield Armory Museum

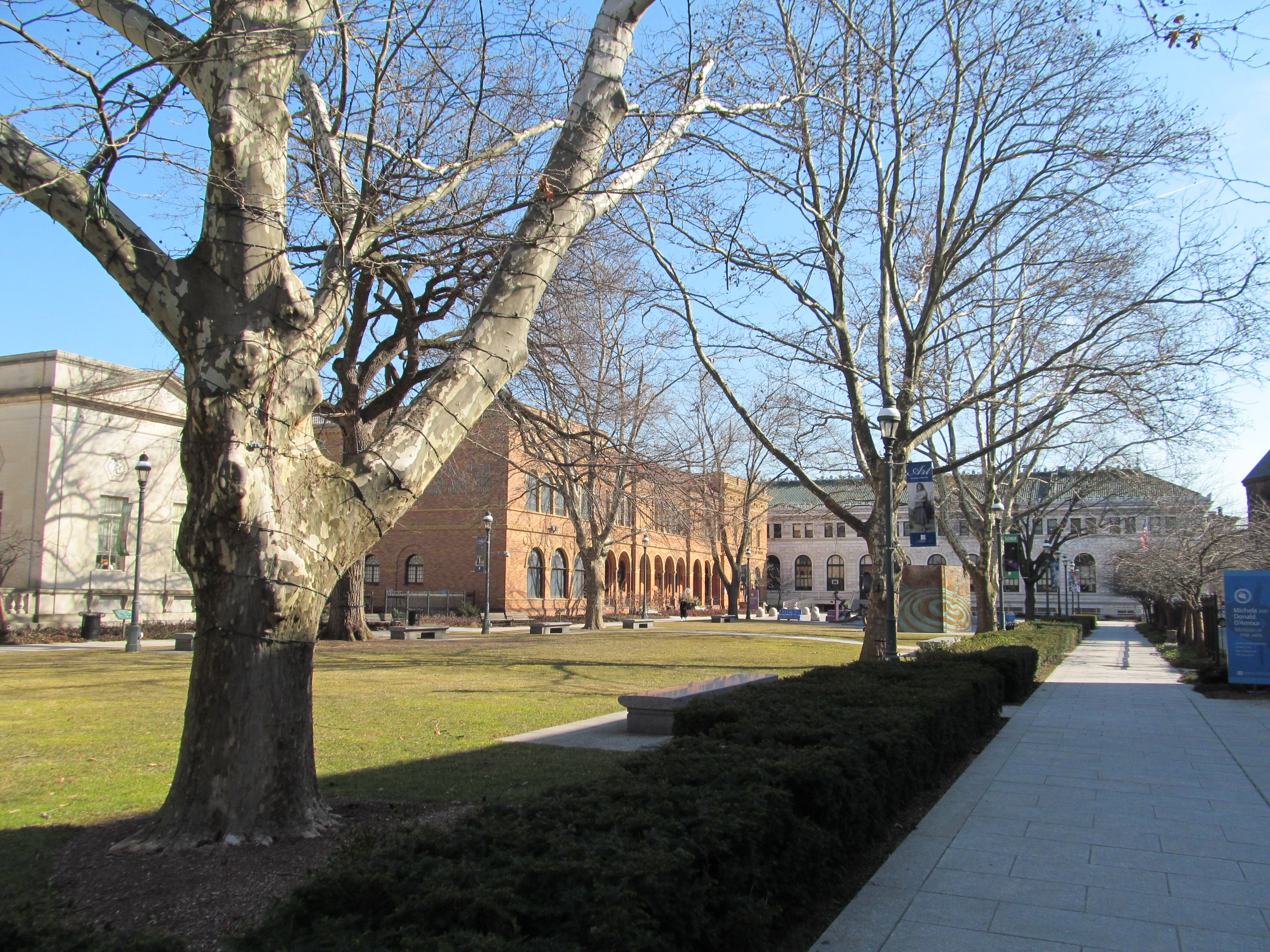
Museum Quadrangle

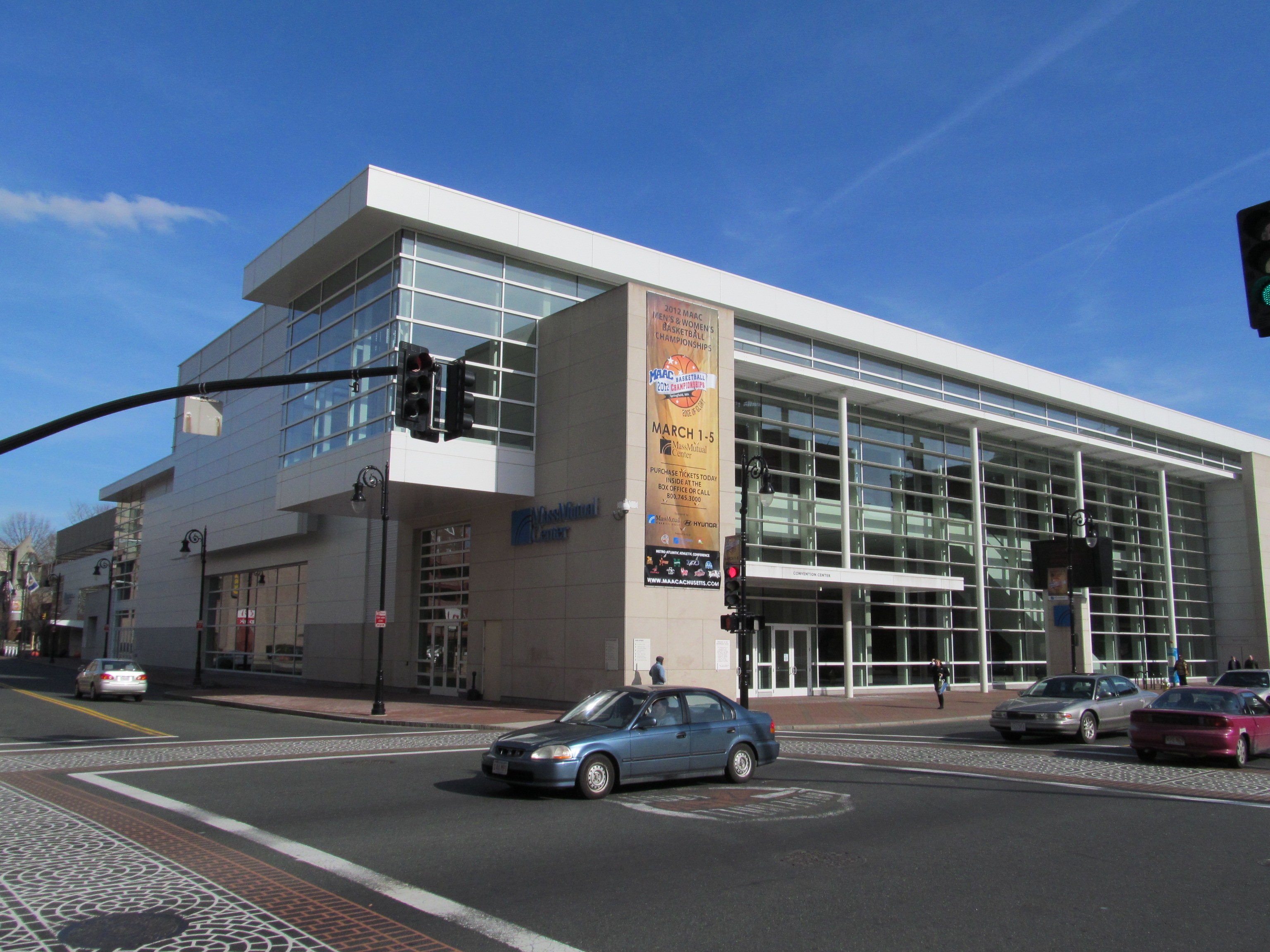
Mass Mutual Center

=== Parks ===
Metro Center features seven prominent parks: Court Square, the city's one constant topographical feature since its founding in 1636; Stearns Square, designed by the creative "dream-team" of Stanford White and August St. Gaudens, then as now in the heart of Springfield's Club Quarter; Tower Square Park, a green park atop a skyscraper in downtown Springfield; Center Square on Main Street, a well-landscaped park that borders the Club Quarter and Downtown Central Business District; Merrick Park, by the Quadrangle, the sole function of which is to exhibit Augustus St. Gaudens' most famous outdoor bronze sculpture, The Puritan; Pynchon Park, a modernist concrete park with trees and a distinctive elevator in the brutalist architectural style – one of the more original looking city parks in the United States, arguably; and Connecticut River Walk Park, a walkway and bikeway that was devastated by the 2011 Greater Springfield tornado, and which previous to it, was rarely used due to Interstate 91 physically blocking Springfielders' access to it. Regardless, if one can make it there, it affords beautiful views of the river, valley, skyline, and mountains surrounding them all.
