= Connecticut River Walk Park =

Park and bikeway in Springfield, Massachusetts

Coordinates: 42°5′53.07″N 72°35′26.05″W

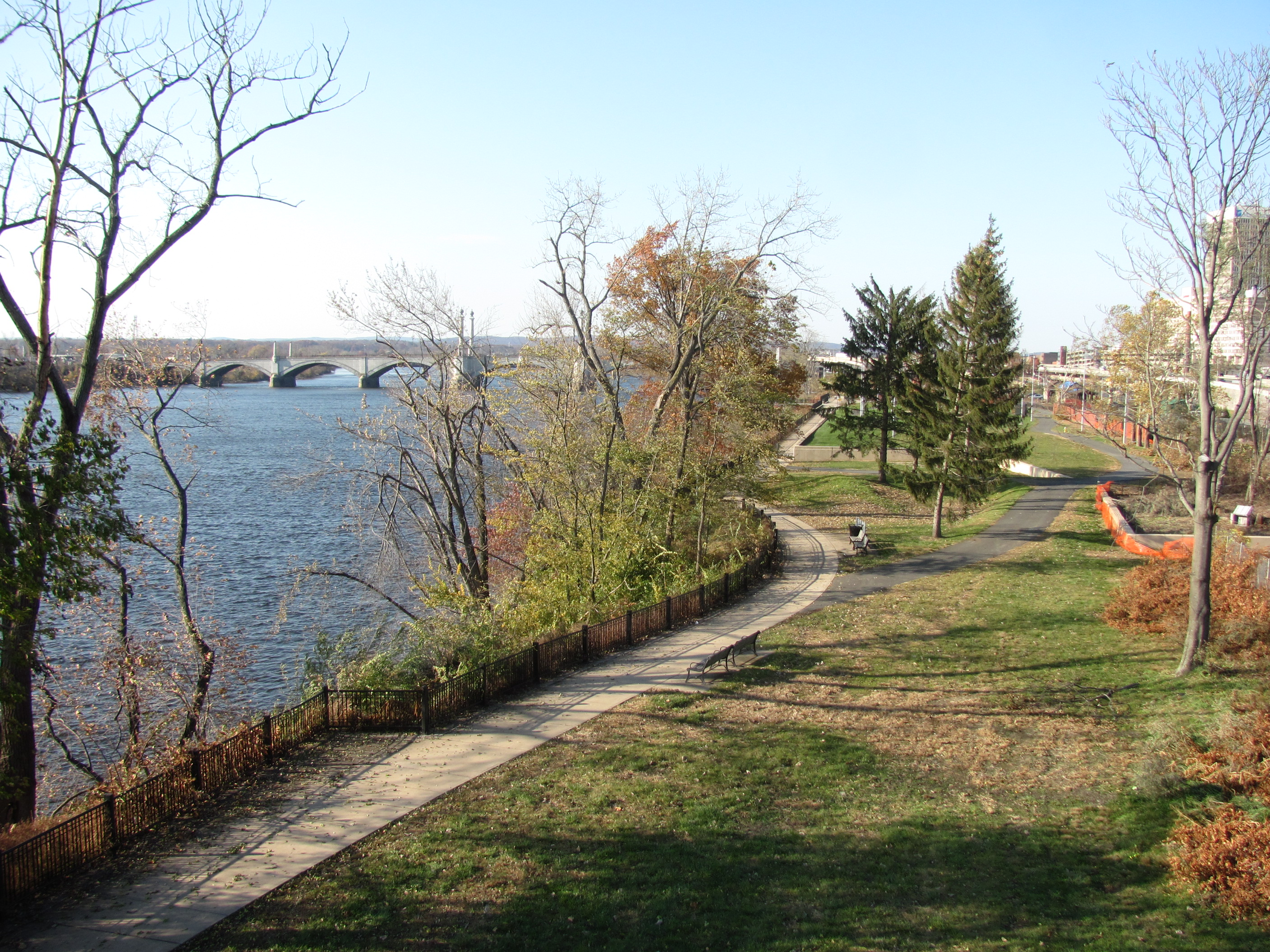
The River Walk, looking north toward the Hampden County Memorial Bridge

The Connecticut River Walk is partially constructed park and bikeway in Springfield, Massachusetts, United States, along the banks of New England's largest river, the Connecticut River. Currently, Springfield's section of this park is 3.7 miles (6 km) long, running from Chicopee, Massachusetts to the South End Bridge in Springfield, Massachusetts. Unusual features of the trail include its path alongside an active train line, making it a "rail-with-trail," and its passing in very close proximity to the Naismith Memorial Basketball Hall of Fame. Most Springfield residents are separated from the river by Interstate 91, a 1960s-era elevated highway.

== Proposed additions ==
The Connecticut River Walk and Bikeway is under development, and the first two sections are open to the public. The segment in Springfield itself is 3.7 miles (6 km) long, and a second segment in Agawam, Massachusetts, is 1.7 miles (2.7 km) long. In total, the route is planned to run for 20 miles (32 km), through city-owned floodplain alongside the Connecticut River.

== Access and Interstate 91 ==
Since the 1960s, Springfielders have been cut off from the economic and recreational development opportunities of the Connecticut River by Interstate 91. The Connecticut River Walk and Bikeway was conceived to revitalize the riverfront. Interstate 91 and its tangential developments—for example, above-grade parking lots built underneath it; tall, earthen, grassy mounds constructed beside it; and even double-sided, 20-foot (6.1 m) limestone walls between the city and the river—pose formidable barriers to pedestrians reaching the Connecticut River Walk from Metro Center.

The 3.7-mile (6 km) park features three entrance points, including a 60-foot-tall (18 m) footbridge behind LA Fitness in the Basketball Hall of Fame complex. In 2011, on Wednesdays at 12:15pm, the city of Springfield held "lunchtime walks" to promote the park.

In 2010, Boston's Urban Land Institute proposed building housing on the river side of the highway along the bike path, but this was not implemented.
