= Springfield Municipal Group =

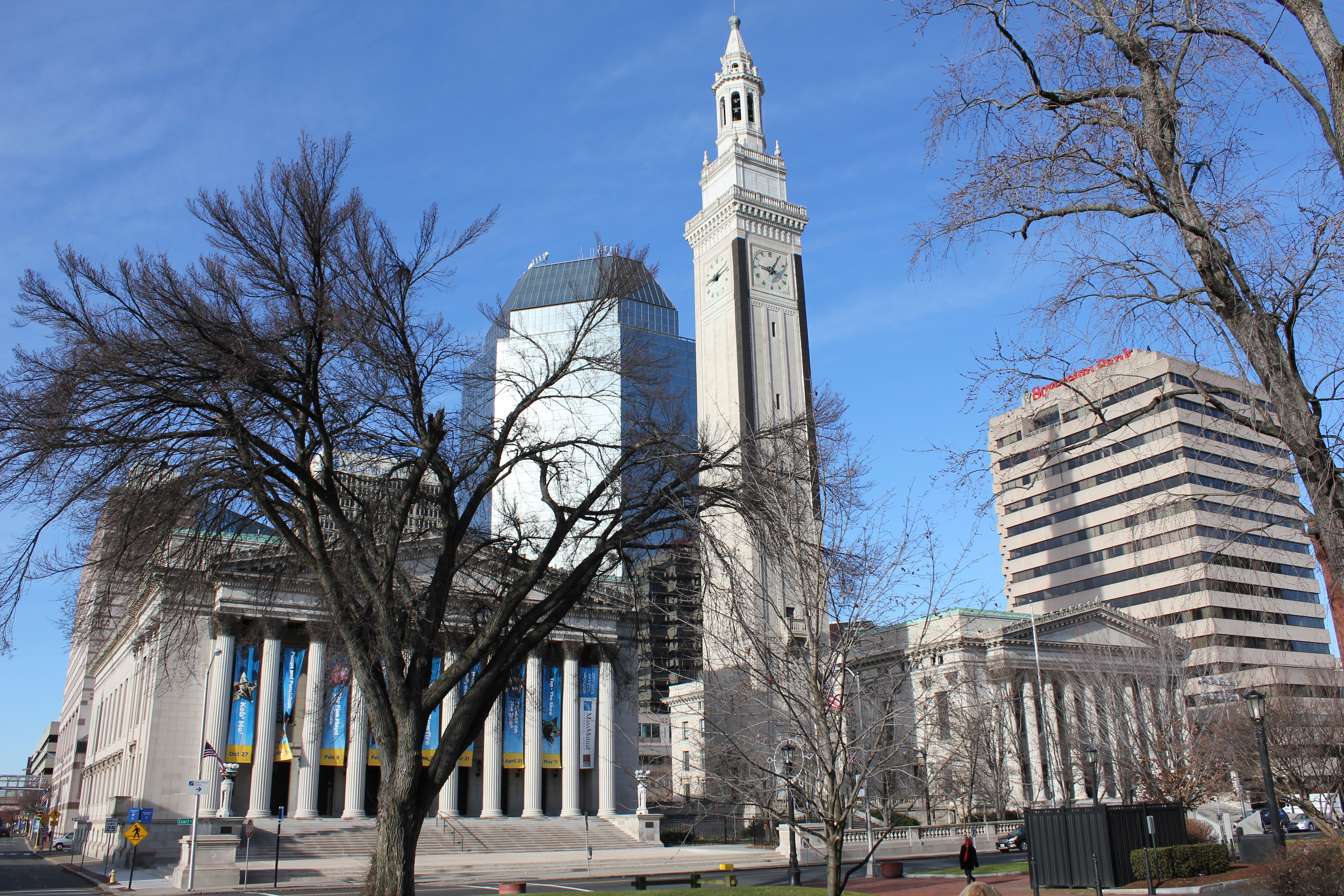
- Springfield Municipal Group, with Symphony Hall to the left and City Hall to the right of the Campanile tower
- Interactive map of the Springfield Municipal Group area

General information
- Status: Completed
- Type: Office; Indoor theatre
- Location: 34-36 Court Street, Springfield, Massachusetts, United States
- Coordinates: 42.101106°N 72.590116°W
- Construction started: 1911
- Completed: 1913

Height
- Roof: 300 ft (91 m)

Technical details
- Floor count: 4; 10 (campanile)

Design and construction
- Architect: Pell & Corbett
- Developer: A. E. Stephens Company, of New York
- Engineer: Hollis French & Allen Hubbard

The Municipal Group of Springfield, Massachusetts, United States is a collection of three prominent municipal buildings in the city's Metro Center district. Consisting of a concert hall, City Hall, and a 300-foot-tall (91 m) clocktower, the Group is a center of government and culture in the city.

The Municipal Complex's architecture is a notable example of the City Beautiful style made popular by Daniel Burnham, an architect from Chicago, Illinois, in the early 20th century.

== Layout ==
A typical illustration of the building used by city offices, with Symphony Hall visible at the left, and City Hall to the right of the campanile respectively.

Bounded by Court and Pynchon Streets, East Columbus Ave, and City Hall Place, the Municipal Group consists of two Greek Revival buildings which house City Hall and Symphony Hall, originally built as the Municipal Auditorium. Between the two is the 300-foot (91 m) Italianate Campanile clock tower. With a carillon of twelve bells, it plays sixteen notes of Handel's Messiah. The face of the clock is fourteen feet in diameter. When originally built, the clock and elevator were powered by water.

The Municipal Group looks out onto Court Square and the city's Old First Church.

=== Symphony Hall ===
Symphony Hall
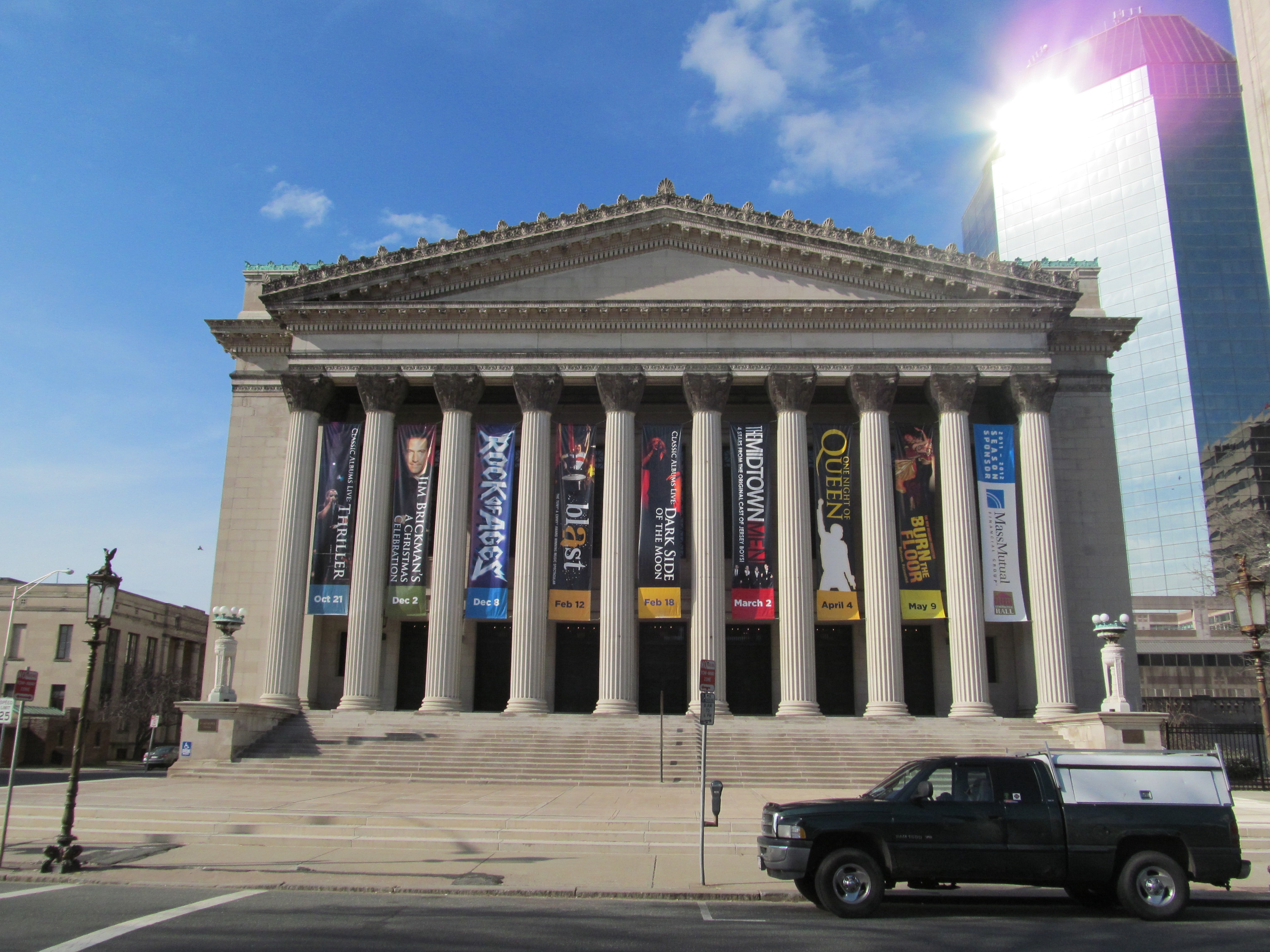
- Interactive map of Symphony Hall
- Former names: Municipal Auditorium
- Address: One Columbus Center; Springfield, Massachusetts; United States
- Capacity: 2,611
- Type: Performing arts center

Construction
- Opened: December 1913

Symphony Hall is a concert venue located on the south end of the complex. Constructed between 1911–1913 and originally known as "The Auditorium," Symphony Hall is known for its excellent acoustics and Greek Revival architecture.

Symphony Hall has a current seating capacity of 2,611 people. Initially it seated over 1,000 more people; however, it has been renovated several times to meet modern seating standards - and modern body sizes - and thus lost seats. The Auditorium was renamed Symphony Hall during the 1940s, after it became the main performance venue for the progressive Springfield Symphony Orchestra. It is also home to Broadway-style theatre, children's programming, internationally recognized speakers, and the yearly induction ceremony for the Naismith Memorial Basketball Hall of Fame, as well as numerous concerts and performances. Symphony Hall is managed by MGM Springfield. MGM Springfield also manages the MassMutual Center in downtown Springfield.

Springfield Symphony Hall was rededicated in 1980 and underwent an extensive renovation in the fall of 2004.

== History ==
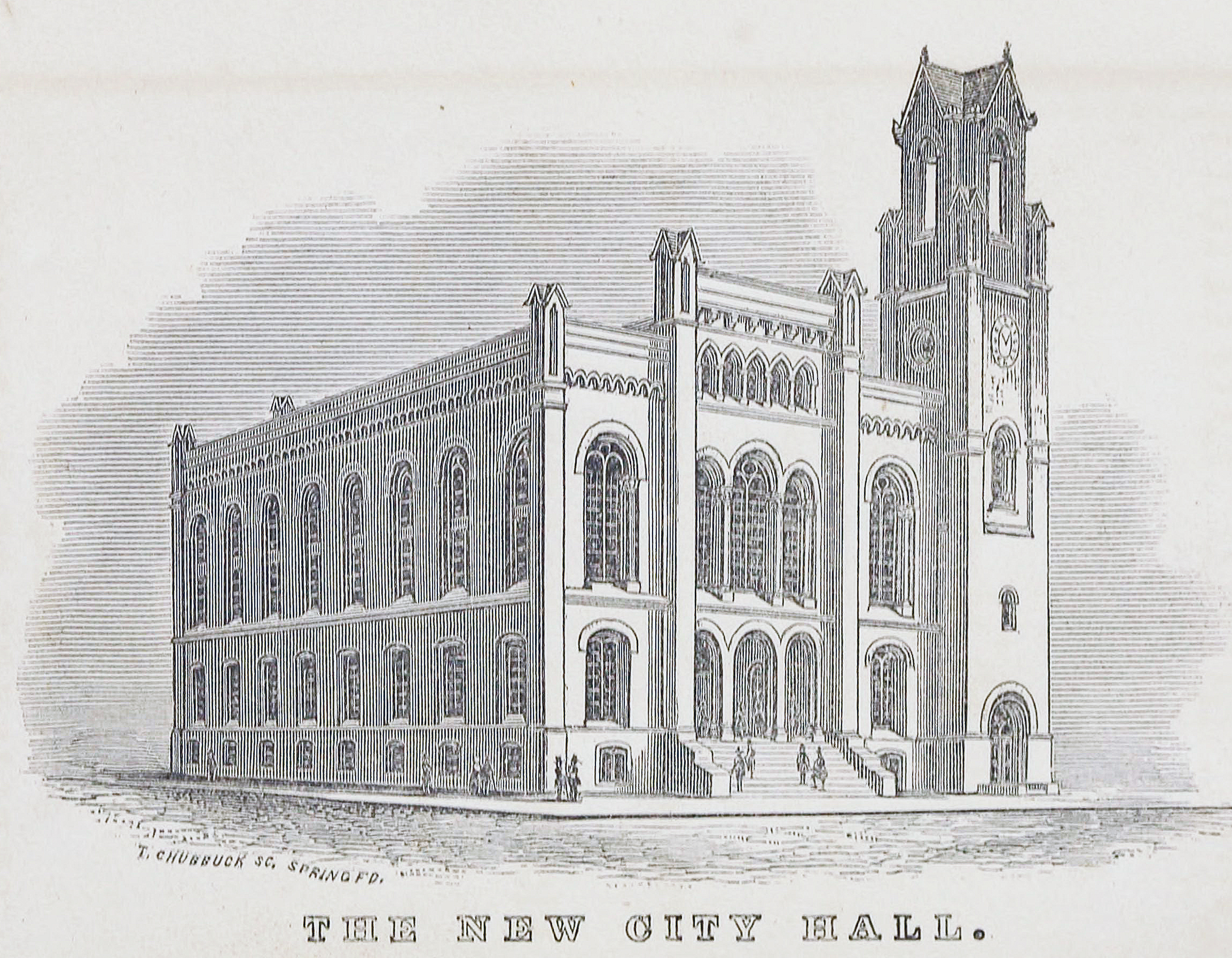
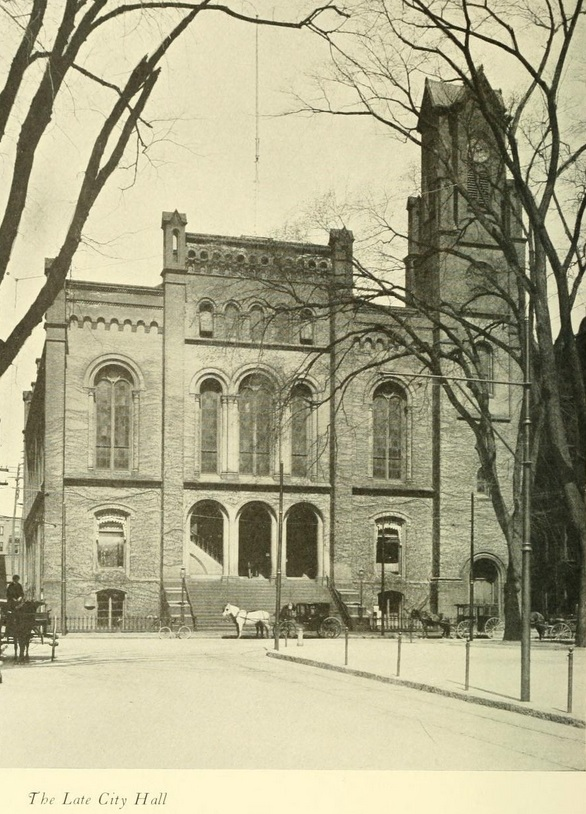
The first City Hall, as it appeared shortly after its completion in 1854 and shortly prior to the fire which razed it in 1905

In 1905, Springfield's first city hall was destroyed by fire. According to legend a monkey upended a kerosene lamp, which ultimately engulfed the building in flames. The city, at the time an industrial powerhouse in New England, financed construction of a grand municipal complex.

During construction, the clocktower was bombed by anarchist Ortie McManigle, the same culprit as the Los Angeles Times bombing. However, the thick walls were not disturbed by the truck bomb, and it was completed in 1913. President William Howard Taft attended the opening ceremonies on December 8–9, 1913.

Over the years, the Municipal Group came to represent the city itself as its most identifiable landmark. Following the end of each of the World Wars, the carillon of bells tolled before jubilant crowds. Due to a legal height restriction in Springfield imposed by the Massachusetts State Legislature in 1908, the Campanile remained the tallest structure in the city until 1973 when Bay State West (now called Tower Square) was built. Its views would remain largely unobstructed until the construction of Monarch Place in 1987.

Over time, as the city's fortunes deteriorated, so did the Municipal Group. Their age made them notoriously expensive to heat and cool. Symphony Hall remained in comparatively good shape, due to the money coming in from performances. However, City Hall and especially the Campanile languished. Sporadic renovations barely would keep City Hall operable. The aging electrical system in the Campanile silenced the bells and structural instability closed it off. The time on each of the clock's faces was rarely correct. Falling debris required officials to constantly widen the area off-limits to passers-by. The tower stood in danger of collapse.

In 2006, the city's Finance Control Board authorized a new capital investment plan, which included money for renovate the entire Municipal Group complex, mostly prominently the Campanile. The improving finances of the city permitted the Control Board to issue bonds to finance the SMG's portion of the capital plan. Before the announcement, a partial renovation of City Hall was underway and will be expanded as a result.

== See also ==
- List of tallest buildings in Springfield, Massachusetts
- List of concert halls
