= Tower Square (Springfield, Massachusetts) =

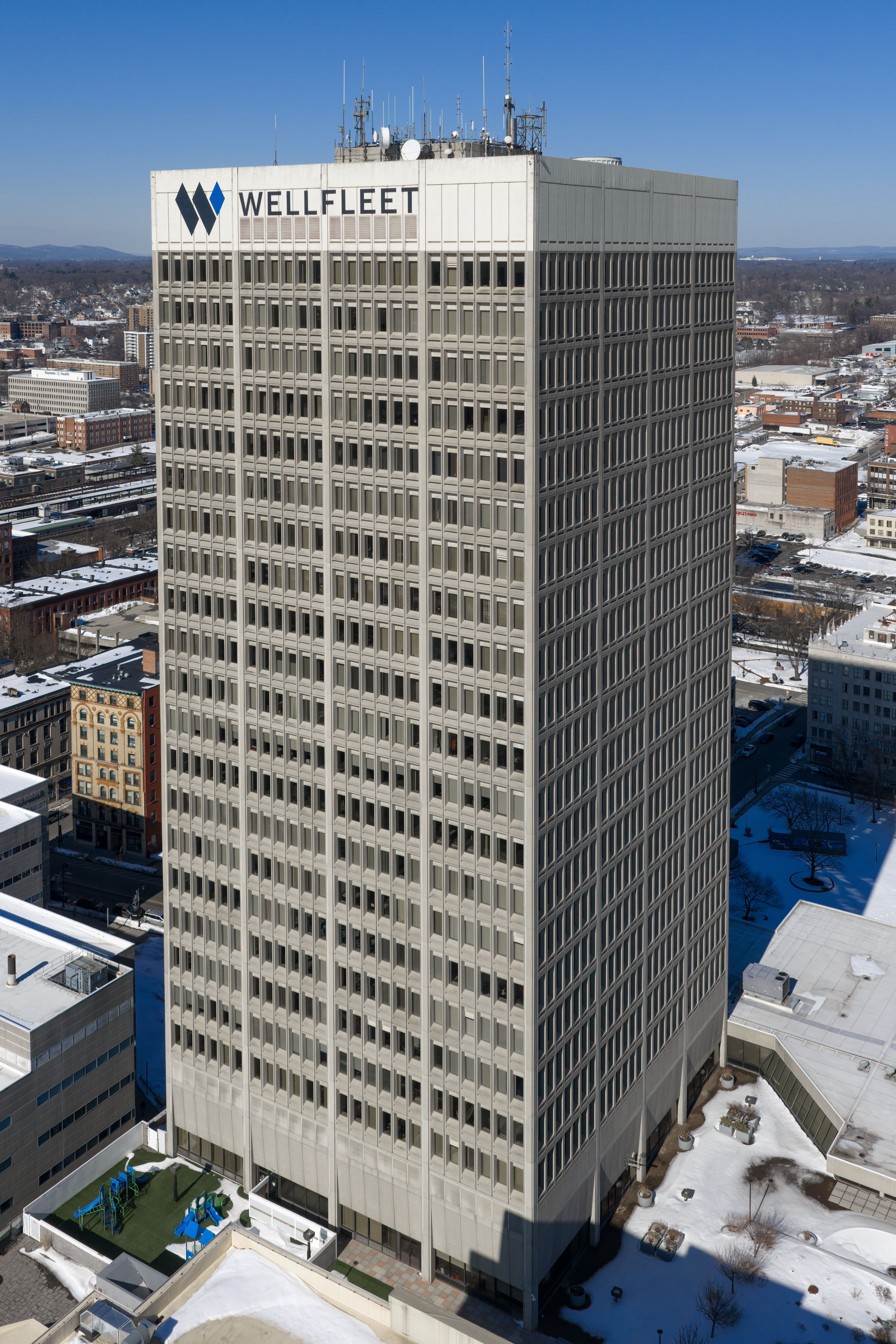
- Former names: The Baystate West Tower
- Alternative names: Baybank Tower, Valley Bank Tower

General information
- Type: Commercial Office
- Architectural style: International
- Location: 1500 Main Street, Springfield, Massachusetts, United States
- Coordinates: 42.1028°N 72.5919°W
- Cost: $52 million (1970 USD)

Height
- Roof: 371 feet (113 m)

Technical details
- Floor count: 29
- Floor area: 300,000 ft^{2} (28,000 m^{2})

Design and construction
- Architect: Pietro Belluschi
- Developer: MassMutual

Website
- http://www.visittowersquare.com/

Tower Square is a 29-story commercial office building located in Springfield, Massachusetts. With a height of 371 feet (113 m), Tower Square is the second tallest building in both Springfield, and in Massachusetts outside of Boston. The building has approximately 300,000 square feet (28,000 m^{2}). The building was developed by Mass Mutual. Constructed in 1970 by Pietro Belluschi; it was designed in the international style.

== History ==
Originally conceived of in 1962 by a business consortium called Springfield CBD, Inc., The developers struggled to get off the ground until it was fully taken over and financed by the locally based, MassMutual Insurance. The mall, 27 story office tower and a 10 story hotel opened in 1970, with construction costs totaling $52 million. The tower was known as Baystate West until 1996 when it later renamed as Tower Square. MassMutual put its name on the top of the office tower in 2003.

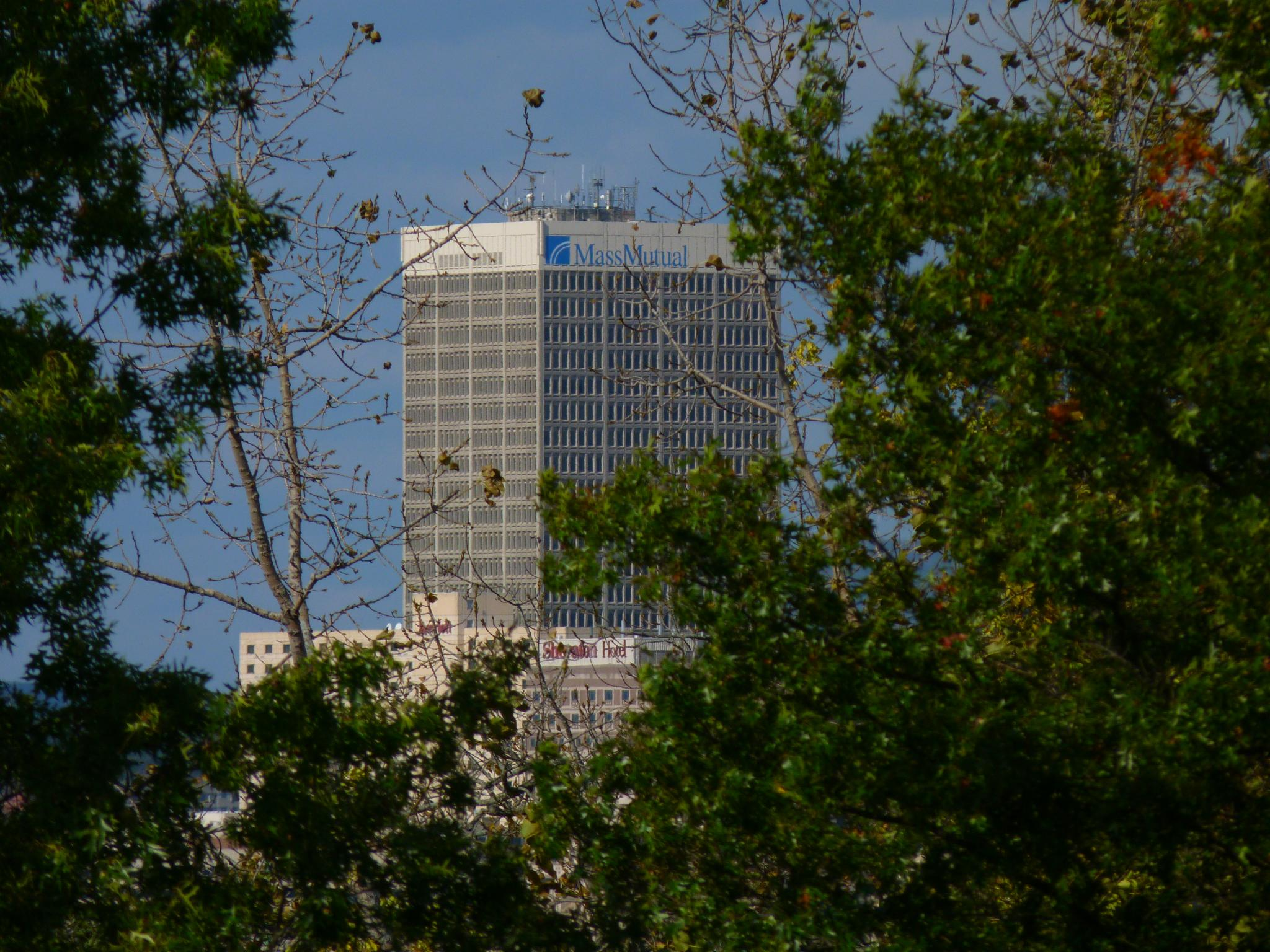
View of Tower Square from Barney Mausoleum in Forest Park - Oct. 2011

The Tower Square hotel lost its Marriott brand name in 2017 as MassMutual planned to sell.

In April 2018, a group of four investors led by Dinesh Patel purchased the Tower Square Hotel for $10.5 million, followed quickly by the purchase of the rest of the Tower Square complex from MassMutual. The sale price for the complex was $7 million.

In August of 2018, MassMutual removed its name from the Tower Square office building, four months after selling the property.The sign was on the north and south sides of the building. Marriott had approved the location to once again be a full-service Marriott hotel once renovations are completed. The Marriott branding returned in the summer of 2022 after a two year $40 million renovation.

In the summer of 2021, Wellfleet Insurance added its logo to the western side of the building facing the Memorial Bridge.

=== Complex ===
- 27 story office tower
- 10 story, 265-room hotel (Marriott Hotels & Resorts)

== See also ==
- Metro Center, Springfield, Massachusetts
- Monarch Place
- List of tallest buildings in Springfield, Massachusetts
- List of tallest buildings Massachusetts outside of Boston
- List of tallest buildings in Boston
