= First Church of Christ, Congregational (Springfield, Massachusetts) =

Historic church in Massachusetts, United States

- U.S. National Register of Historic Places
- U.S. Historic district – Contributing property
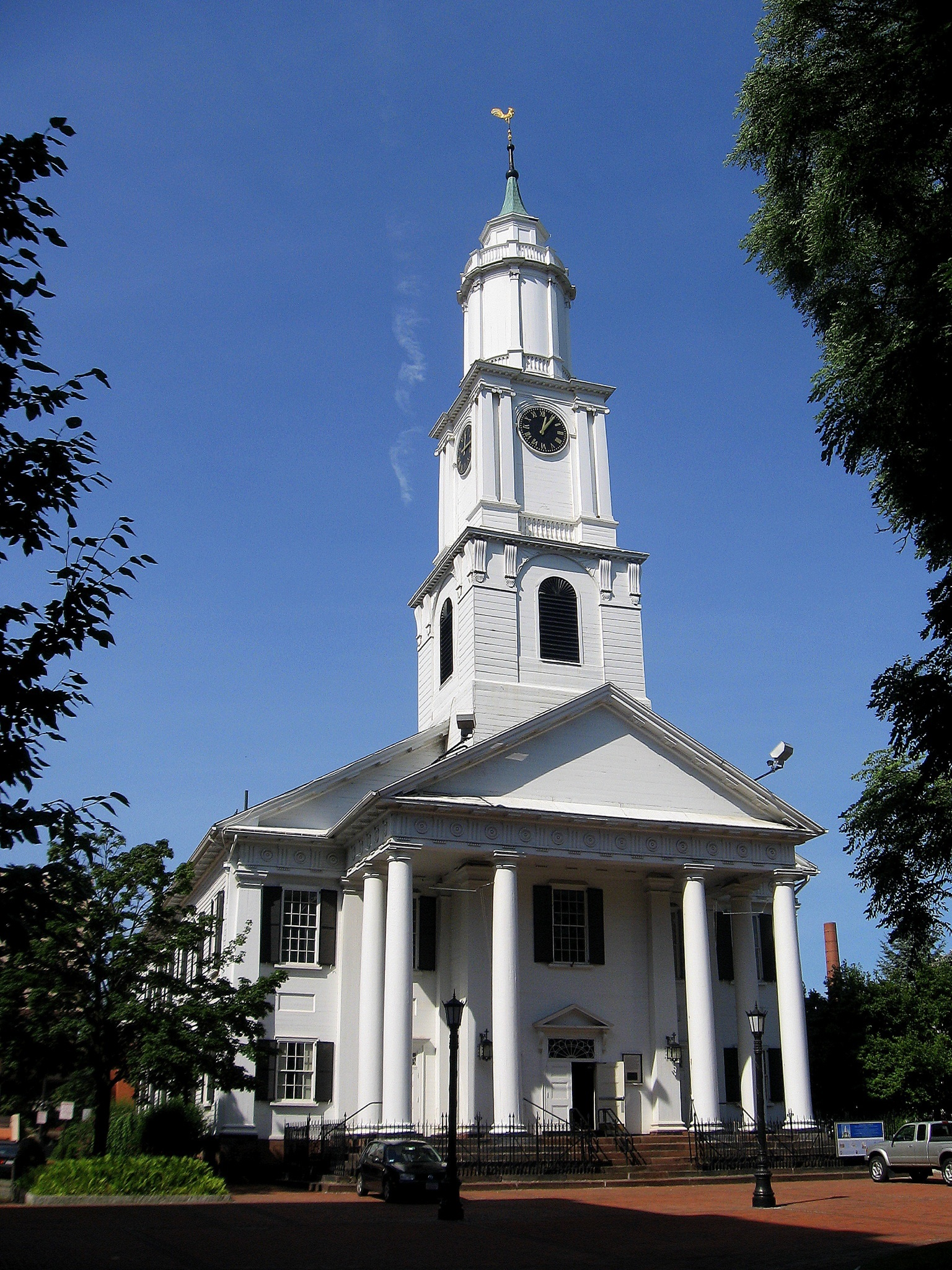
- First Church of Christ

- Location within Massachusetts Location within the United States
- Location: Springfield, Massachusetts
- Coordinates: 42°6′3″N 72°35′23″W
- Built: 1819
- Architect: Isaac Damon
- Architectural style: Greek Revival, Federal
- Part of: Court Square Historic District (ID74000370)
- NRHP reference No.: 72000135

Significant dates
- Added to NRHP: February 1, 1972
- Designated CP: May 2, 1974

First Church of Christ, Congregational, or Old First Church, is a historic church at 50 Elm Street in Springfield, Massachusetts. Built in 1819, the present structure is the fourth church building on the site, and was added to the National Register of Historic Places in 1972. The church is within the Court Square Historic District.

== History ==
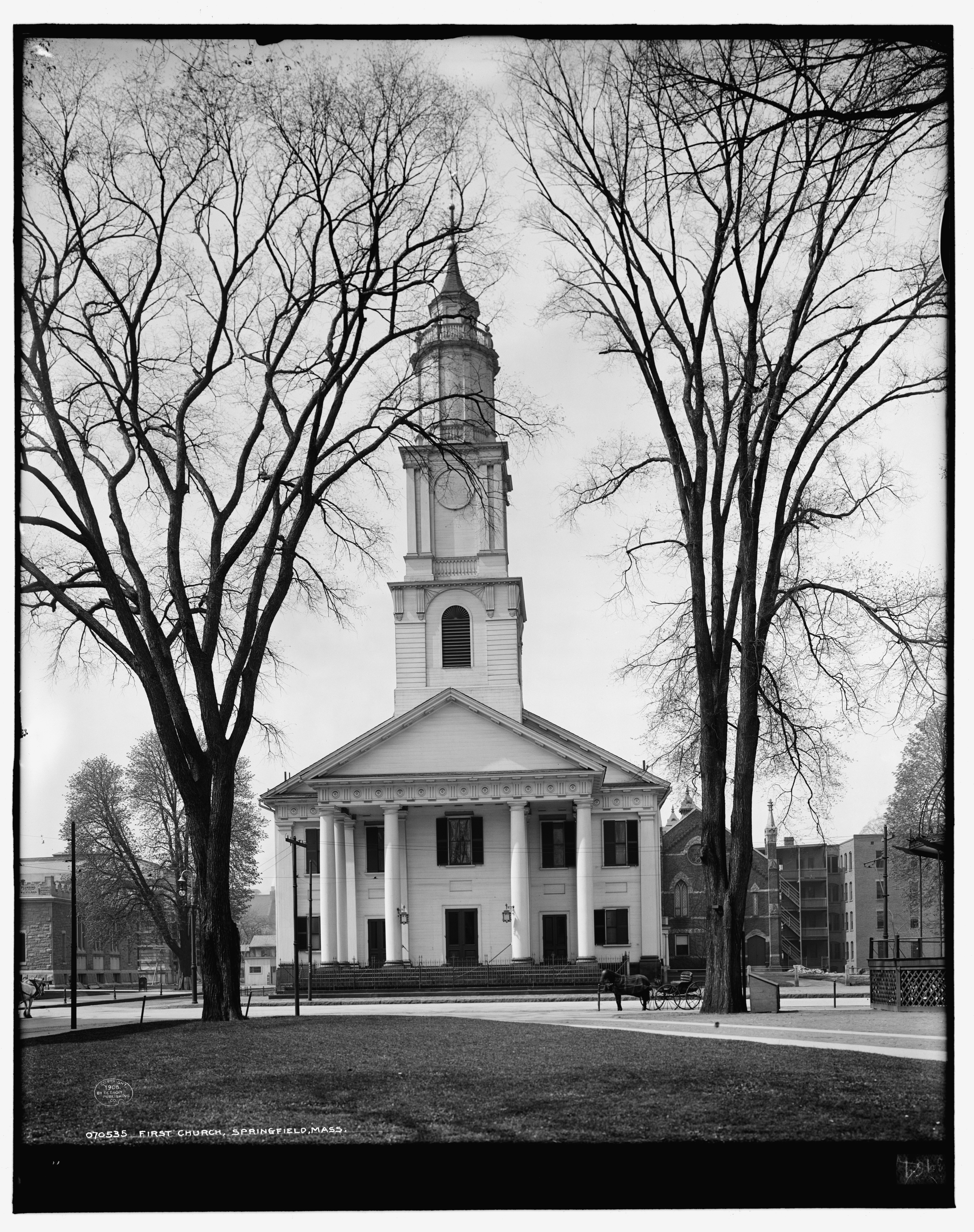
View of the church around 1908

The First Church was organized in 1637, the year following Springfield's founding by Puritan iconoclast and businessman, William Pynchon. The first church building was built in 1645 by Thomas Cooper, on what is now the southeast corner of Court Square. It had two towers: one for the bell, and the other to watch for approaching Indians. It was replaced in 1677 by the second meeting house, and the third was built in 1752. The third one was, in turn, replaced by the current building in 1819.

Noted abolitionist Dr. Samuel Osgood was the pastor of the congregation from 1809 to 1854. It was during this time that the present building was visited by notable figures such as Daniel Webster and John Brown, who resided in Springfield for some time. In addition, Jenny Lind performed a concert in the church in July 1851, and in 1848, the body of President John Quincy Adams lay in state in the center aisle of the sanctuary.

== Present Use ==
Because of maintenance costs and dwindling membership, the First Church disbanded in 2007, after 370 years in existence. The building was sold to the City of Springfield for $900,000. In 2011, the roof of the building was damaged by the June 1st tornado that tore through Western Massachusetts, and was repaired by the city using federal funds. The building has been closed for over a decade.

== Architecture ==
The church was designed by Isaac Damon (1781–1862), a noted Western Massachusetts architect from Northampton. During his career, he designed 13 churches, including the First Congregational Church of Blandford, Southwick Congregational Church, and the First Church of Northampton.

From 1908 until 1970, the height of the steeple on the Old First Church (125 feet) was used as a legal limit for heights of buildings in Springfield, as per the order of the Massachusetts State Legislature in 1908, (the one exception being the Springfield Municipal Group, dedicated in 1913 by President William Howard Taft.) Thus, in Springfield, one finds fewer skyscrapers than one does in most comparable United States cities, (e.g. Hartford, Connecticut and Providence, Rhode Island.)

The following paragraph, written by Springfield architect Eugene C. Gardner, illustrates the importance of the Old First Church to Springfield:

- "As in the old New England towns, almost without exception, the first church erected was the point from which all things emanated, toward which all things tended, and around which everything revolved. It not only dominated the green turf in front, and the sometimes dreary burial ground behind, or at one side, but it set the pace for all other local affairs, social, political and educational as well as religious. It has not always happened, however, as here, that this ethical and business center has remained the visible aesthetic center. And although but a comparatively small part of our best architectural growth has been adjacent to Court square, and other churches have shared the burdens and responsibilities of directing our temporal as well as spiritual concerns, the characteristic, though by no means ornate, or altogether graceful, spire of the First church remains, as regards locality, the civic center of gravity."

== Ministers ==
- George Moxon: 1637–1652
- Pelatiah Glover: 1660–1692
- Daniel Brewer: 1694–1733
- Robert Breck: 1736–1784
- Bezaleel Howard: 1785–1809
- Samuel Osgood: 1809–1854
- Henry M. Parsons: 1854–1870
- Edward A. Reed: 1871–1878
- Edward Payson Terhune: 1879–1884
- Michael Burnham: 1885–1894
- Frank Lincoln Goodspeed: 1894–1908
- Neil McPherson: Began in 1910

== See also ==
- National Register of Historic Places listings in Springfield, Massachusetts
- National Register of Historic Places listings in Hampden County, Massachusetts
