= List of tallest buildings in Massachusetts outside of Boston =

This is a list of the 26 tallest buildings in the U.S. state of Massachusetts outside of Boston, its capital and largest city. The U.S state of Massachusetts is a New England State north of New York and shares its border with Vermont, New Hampshire, Rhode Island, Connecticut and New York. The buildings listed below are monitored by the Board of Building Regulations and Standards of Massachusetts.

Of the buildings listed, the top three are 121 Broadway (a 450 foot tall building in Cambridge), Monarch Place (a 401 foot tall building in Springfield), and Tower Square (a 370 foot tall building, also in Springfield).

Rankings are approximate; their accuracy cannot be guaranteed on account of uncertainties in the height data and the possibility of missing items.

== List ==
Rank	Name	Image	Height ft (m)	Floors	Year	Location	Use	Ref.
1	121 Broadway		450 ft (137 m)	37	2026	Cambridge	Residential	
2	Monarch Place		401 ft (122 m)	26	1987	Springfield	Commercial office	
3	Tower Square		370 ft (110 m)	29	1970	Springfield	Commercial office	
4	Encore Boston Harbor		350 ft (110 m)	24	2019	Everett	Casino, hotel	
5	MIT Site 4		315 ft (96 m)	29	2020	Cambridge	Student housing	
6	Springfield Municipal Group Campanile		300 ft (91 m)	-	1913	Springfield	Campanile	
7=	W.E.B. Du Bois Library		297 ft (91 m)	22	1964	UMassAmherst, Amherst	University	
7=	Prospect Union Square		297 ft (91 m)	25	2023	Somerville	Residential	
9	Green Building		295 ft (90 m)	21	1964	MIT, Cambridge	University	
10	145 Broadway		294 ft (90 m)	19	2018	Cambridge	Commercial office	
11	Boston Marriott Cambridge		290 ft (88 m)	26	1988	Cambridge	Hotel	
12=	Skyview Downtown		289 ft (88 m)	34	1977	Springfield	Residential	
12=	The 6Hundred		289 ft (88 m)	22	1964	Worcester	Residential	
12=	Worcester Plaza		289 ft (88 m)	20	1975	Worcester	Commercial office	
15	Proto Kendall Square		284 ft (87 m)	22	2018	Cambridge		
16	MIT Site 5		280 ft (85 m)	18	2020	MIT, Cambridge	University	
17	North Point Apartments		237 ft (72 m)	22	2008	Cambridge	Residential	
18=	Calvin Coolidge Tower		276 ft (84 m)	22	1966	UMassAmherst, Amherst	Student housing	
18=	John Adams Tower		276 ft (84 m)	22	1966	UMassAmherst, Amherst	Student housing	
18=	John Quincy Adams Tower		276 ft (84 m)	22	1966	UMassAmherst, Amherst	Student housing	
18=	John F. Kennedy Tower		276 ft (84 m)	22	1966	UMassAmherst, Amherst	Student housing	
18=	George Washington Tower		276 ft (84 m)	22	1966	UMassAmherst, Amherst	Student housing	
23	101 Main St		270 ft (82 m)	18	1983	Cambridge	Commercial office	
24	Ayer Mill		267 ft (81 m)	6	1909	Lawrence	Industrial	
25	40 Thorndike Street		258 ft (79 m)	20	1974 (renovated 2024)	Cambridge	Office, residential	

== See also ==
- List of tallest buildings in Boston
- List of tallest buildings and structures in Cambridge, Massachusetts
- List of tallest buildings in Springfield, Massachusetts
- List of tallest buildings in Worcester, Massachusetts
