= Springfield Symphony Orchestra =

Orchestra in Massachusetts, USA

- Orchestra
- Founded: 1944; 81 years ago
- Location: Springfield, Massachusetts, US
- Concert hall: Springfield Symphony Hall
- Website: www.springfieldsymphony.org

The Springfield Symphony Orchestra is an American orchestra based in Springfield, Massachusetts. It performs at Symphony Hall, a part of the Springfield Municipal Group.

The Springfield Symphony (SSO) got its start when the conductor of the amateur Pioneer Valley Symphony of Greenfield, Alexander Leslie, decided he was ready to lead a professional organization. After gaining the support of the area cultural and business communities, Leslie began to assemble an orchestra based in Springfield, which had no professional orchestra.

The SSO performed its first concert at the Municipal Auditorium in 1944. Its first performance was given great reviews and even recorded by the Office of War Information for rebroadcast overseas.

The SSO has throughout its history support musical education programs in the Greater Springfield area.

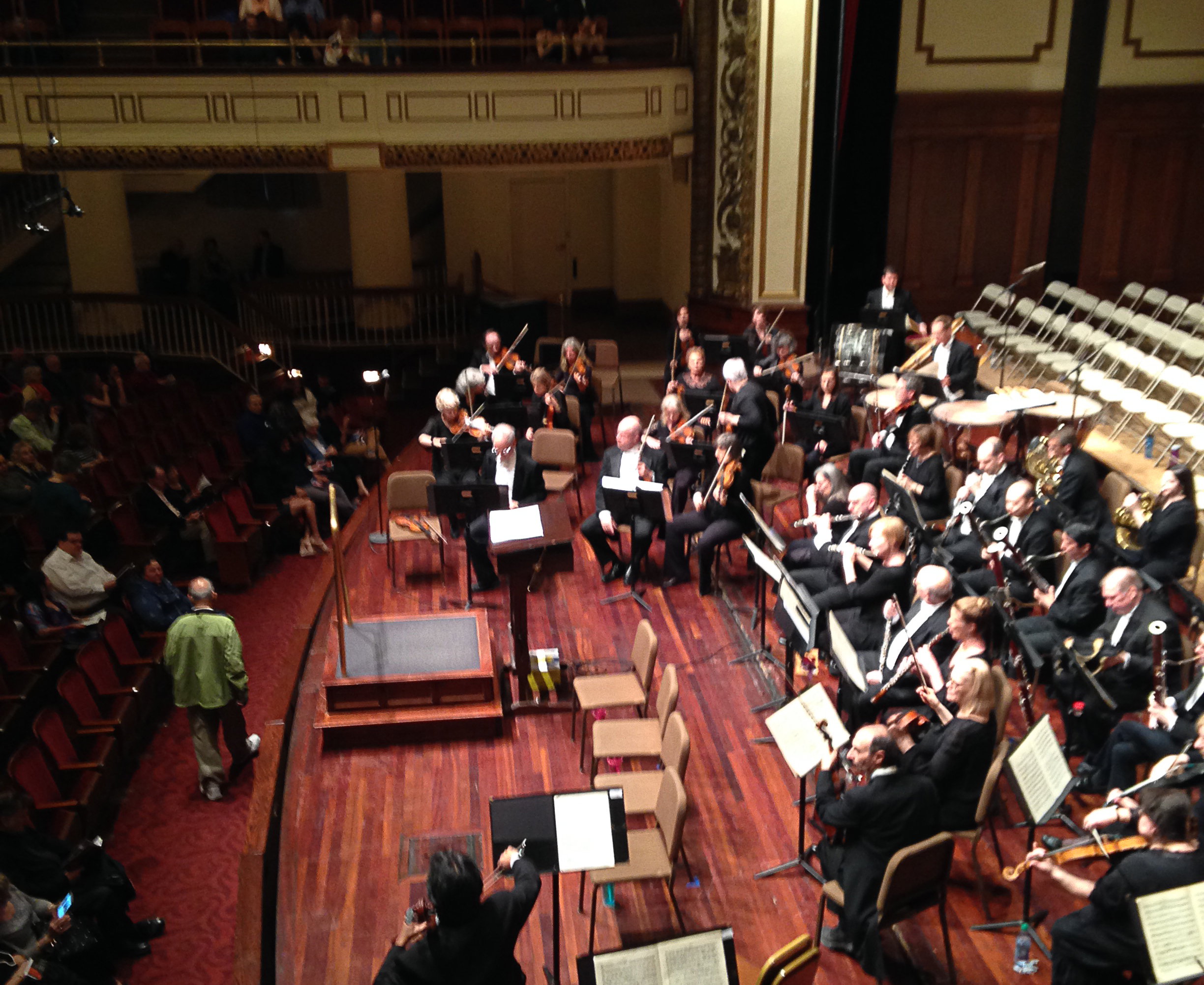
Players of the Springfield Symphony Orchestra warm up prior to a performance, 2018

Today, the SSO is the largest symphony in Massachusetts outside of Boston, and was described by D. Antoinette Handy, a former music director of the National Endowment for the Arts, as "one of the nation's premiere regional orchestras". It consists of 80 musicians from New England and Canada and usually holds as many as 150 performances as either the full orchestra or in ensemble formats. Its concerts are often broadcast over WFCR, the area NPR station.

It is the parent organization of two youth orchestras: the Springfield Youth Sinfonia (formally Young Person's Philharmonia) and the Springfield Youth Orchestra (formally Young Person's Symphony). They offer young musicians a chance to play in a full orchestra, an option not offered in many schools.
