= Court Square =

Historic district in Springfield, Massachusetts

- Court Square Historic District
- U.S. National Register of Historic Places
- U.S. Historic district
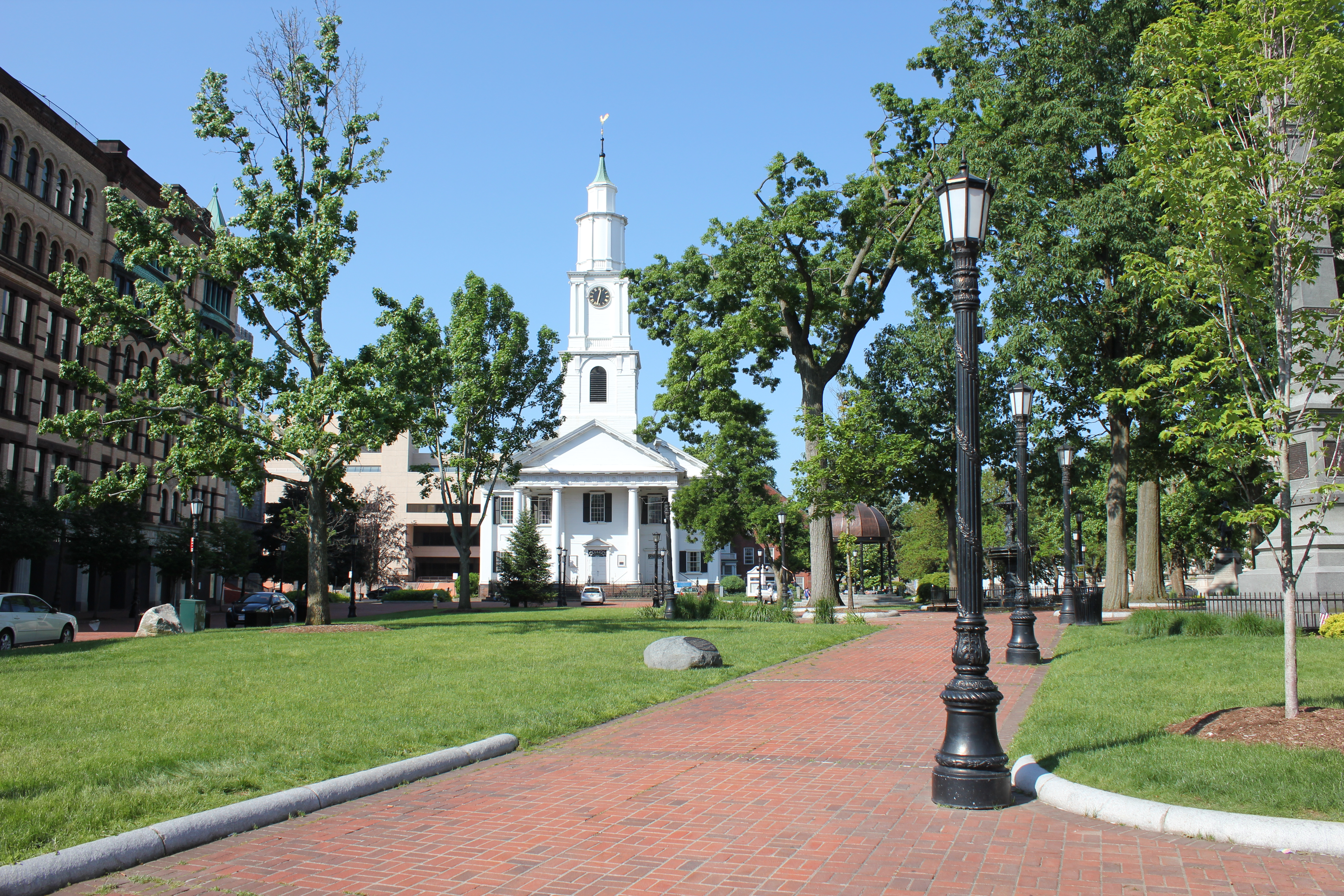
- Court Square

- Location within Massachusetts Location within the United States
- Location: Springfield, Massachusetts
- Coordinates: 42°6′2″N 72°35′22″W
- Built: 1812
- Architect: Newman, Frederick S.; Pell, F. Livington & Corbett, Harvey W.
- Architectural style: Classical Revival, Romanesque, Federal
- NRHP reference No.: 74000370
- Added to NRHP: May 2, 1974

Court Square is the central plaza and historic district in Springfield, Massachusetts. It is located in the heart of Springfield's urban Metro Center neighborhood. Court Square is the City of Springfield's only topographical constant since its founding in 1636.

It is bounded by Springfield Municipal Group of buildings on Court Street, MassMutual Center on Main Street, MGM Springfield on State Street, East Columbus Avenue, and features Elm Street and a scenic pedestrian-only walkway from the Hampden County Courthouse toward Springfield's historic Old First Church.

== History ==
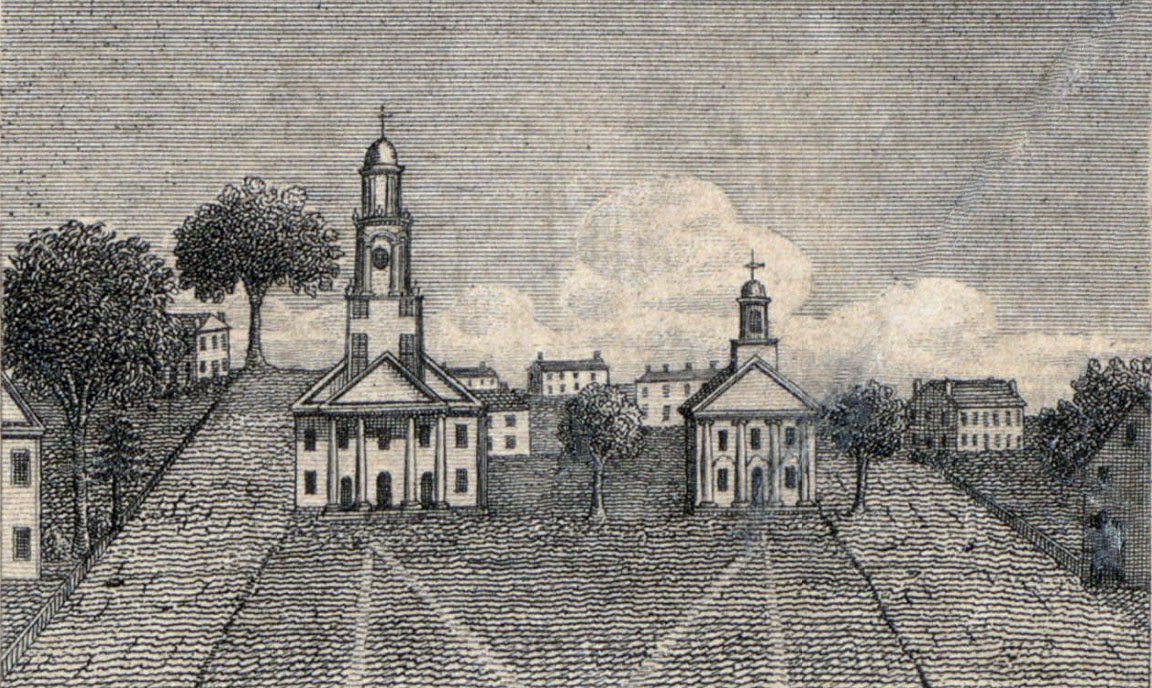
Court Square and the Old First Church of Springfield, Massachusetts, as it appeared in about 1827.

Springfield's Old First Church has been located in Court Square since the 17th century. It was the twentieth parish formed in the Massachusetts Bay Colony, and was gathered in 1637, the year after Springfield was founded. The first meetinghouse was erected just east of this site in 1645. The current Old First Church (b. 1819) is the fourth building on this site, built by a Northampton architect, Isaac Damon. The rooster weathervane on the steeple was crafted by a Coppersmith in London, England, and brought to this country in 1750. Here inventor Thomas Blanchard and abolitionist John Brown worshipped; Daniel Webster spoke; and Jenny Lind sang.

In 1892 the Court Square Theater opened in the square at 11 Elm St; remaining one of Springfield's landmark structures until the mid-1950s when it was demolished. In 1902, the year of the city's golden jubilee, $100,000 was raised in public donations to fund a project extending Court Square to the Connecticut River, spurred by a donation of $10,000 by the estate of the late Tilly Haynes, one of Springfield's most active citizens. In the late 1950s, Haynes' contribution was undermined when Court Square was separated from the Connecticut River by the construction of the elevated Interstate 91, and a 1,754 car parking lot beneath it.

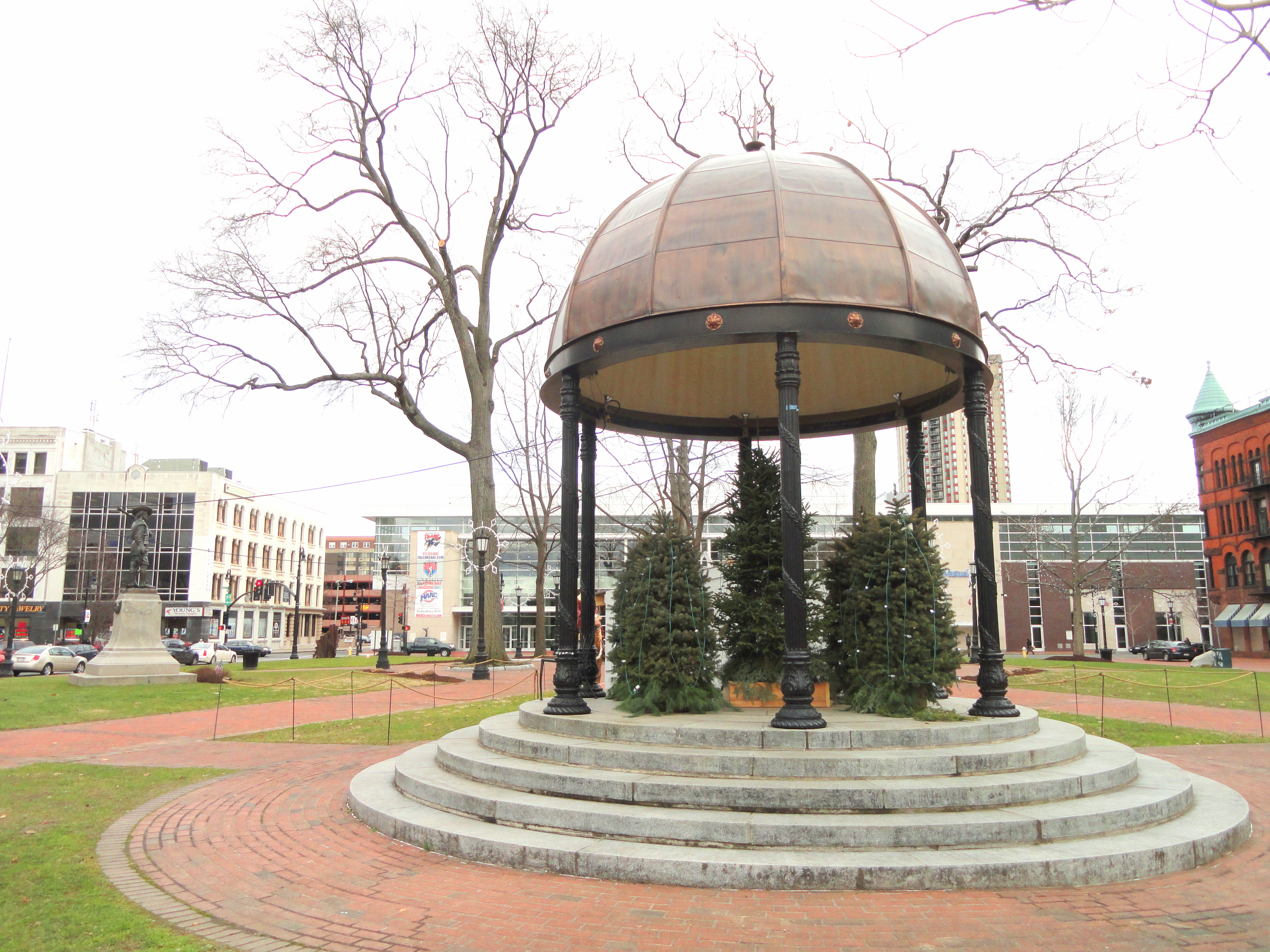
View of the square, December 2012

The ornate, gothic stone Court House – now the juvenile court house – to the left of the church, was designed by renowned architect H.H. Richardson and built in 1909. To the right of the church, the Springfield Municipal Group was erected in 1911–13, and dedicated by United States President William Howard Taft in December 1913. In his dedication speech, President Taft praised the Springfield Municipal Group as "one of the most distinctive civic centers in the United States – and indeed, the world." The Municipal Group features a 300 ft. tall Italianate Campanile, which until the early 1970s, was the tallest building in Springfield (as per moratorium on skyscrapers in Springfield by the Massachusetts State Legislature.)

In 2010, UMass Amherst located its Urban Design Program to the Byers Block, across Main Street from the MassMutual Center. 3–7 Elm Street, part of the historic Byers Block, was constructed for James Byers in 1835 by architect Simon Sanborn. This remaining part of the Block constitutes the oldest commercial building still standing in Springfield. The building has served several functions throughout the years. These range from the Elm Street Tree Shop (which occupied the ground floor from 1866 to 1906) to the offices of several notable Springfield citizens, including George Bancroft, George Ashmun, Reuben Chapman, 12 Springfield judges and 7 Springfield mayors.

West of the Byers Block, the Romanesque Revival Court Square Building was originally a hotel and a renowned theater. A sixth floor was added to the building in 1900, including a tower that graces the elevator penthouse at the eastern end. The hotel became offices by the 1930s; however, the Court Square Playhouse remained the city's premier live theater until its surprise demolition in 1957. The Court Square Building features a brown brick exterior relieved with details of brownstone, terra-cotta, and granite. The Byers building was reconstructed by architect Ben Schenkelberg in 2003, his goal was to preserve the history of the Byers Building. Ben won an Award on the Byers Building for outstanding restoring and preservation. #BMSarchitect #The historic district encompassing Court Square and its surrounding buildings was listed on the National Register of Historic Places in 1974.

Beginning in 2023, the park and surrounding roads have undergone renovations contracted by the city and designed by Copley Wolff Design Group, a landscape architecture firm based in Boston, MA. The park has partially reopened as of mid-2025.

== Gallery ==
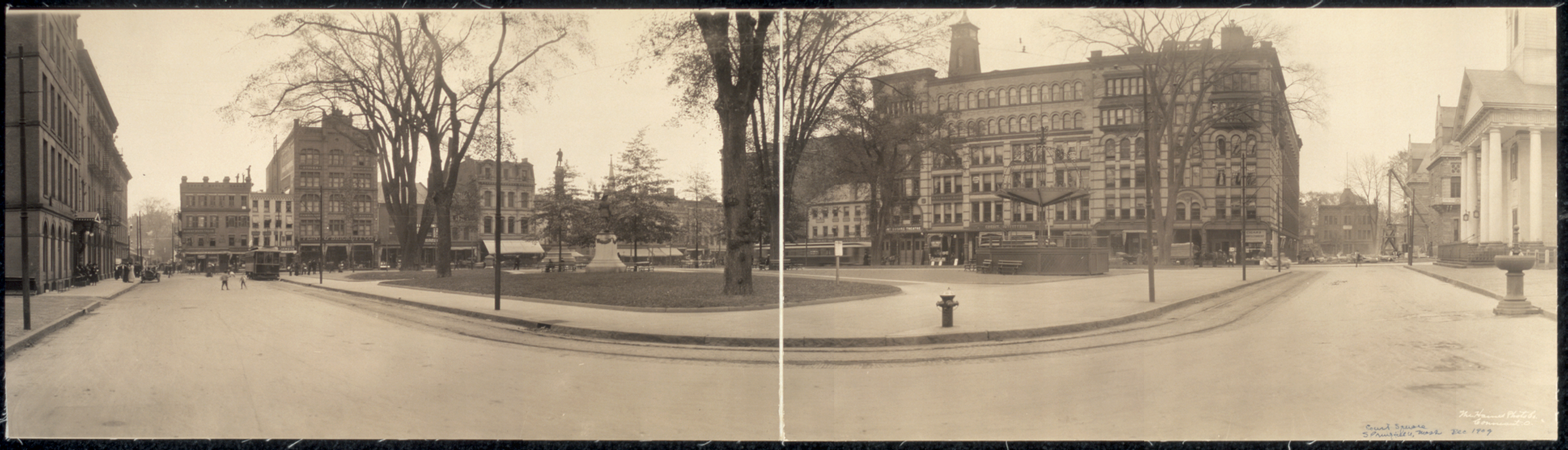
Public Square in 1909, Court square #2, Springfield, Mass

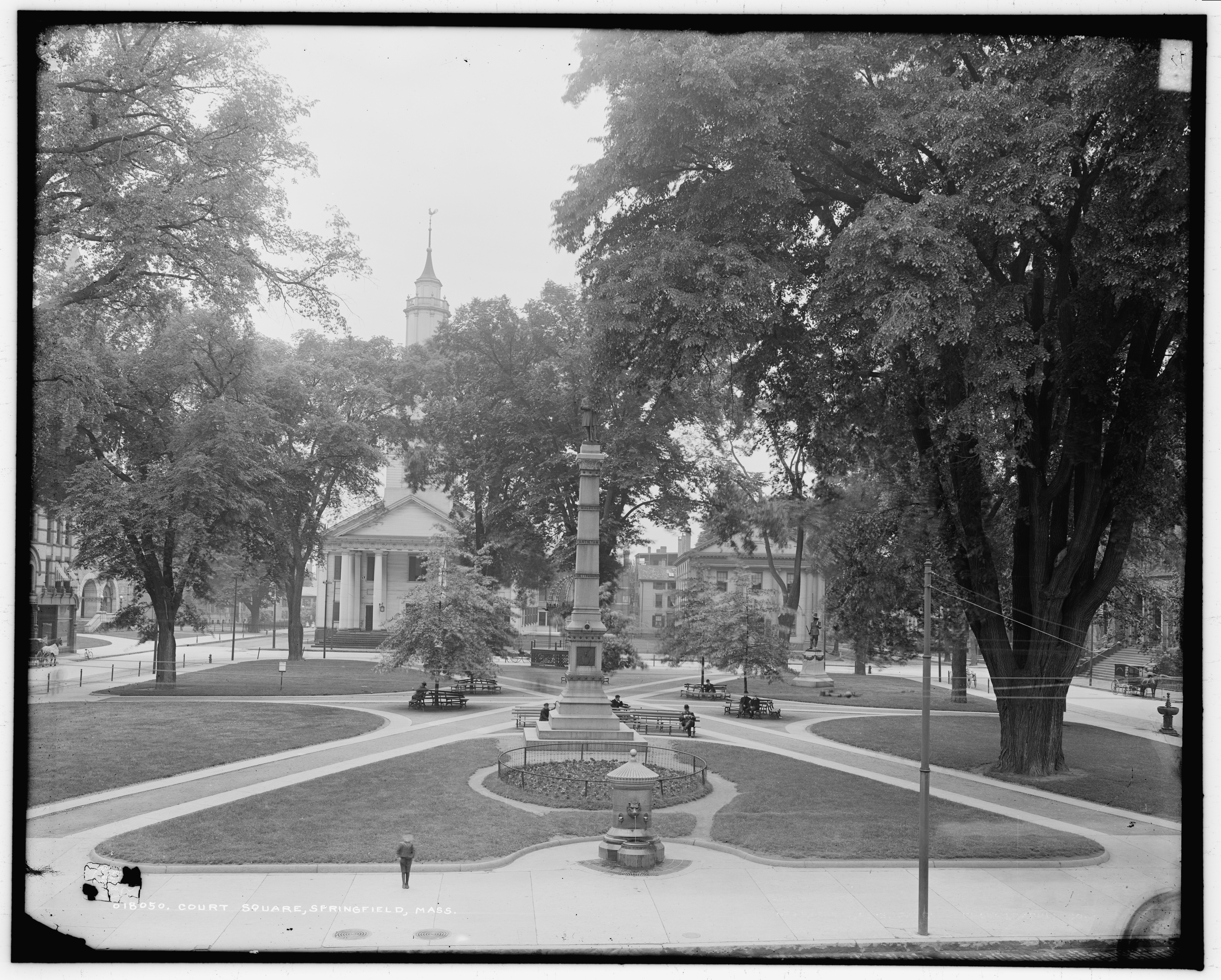
Court Square around 1905

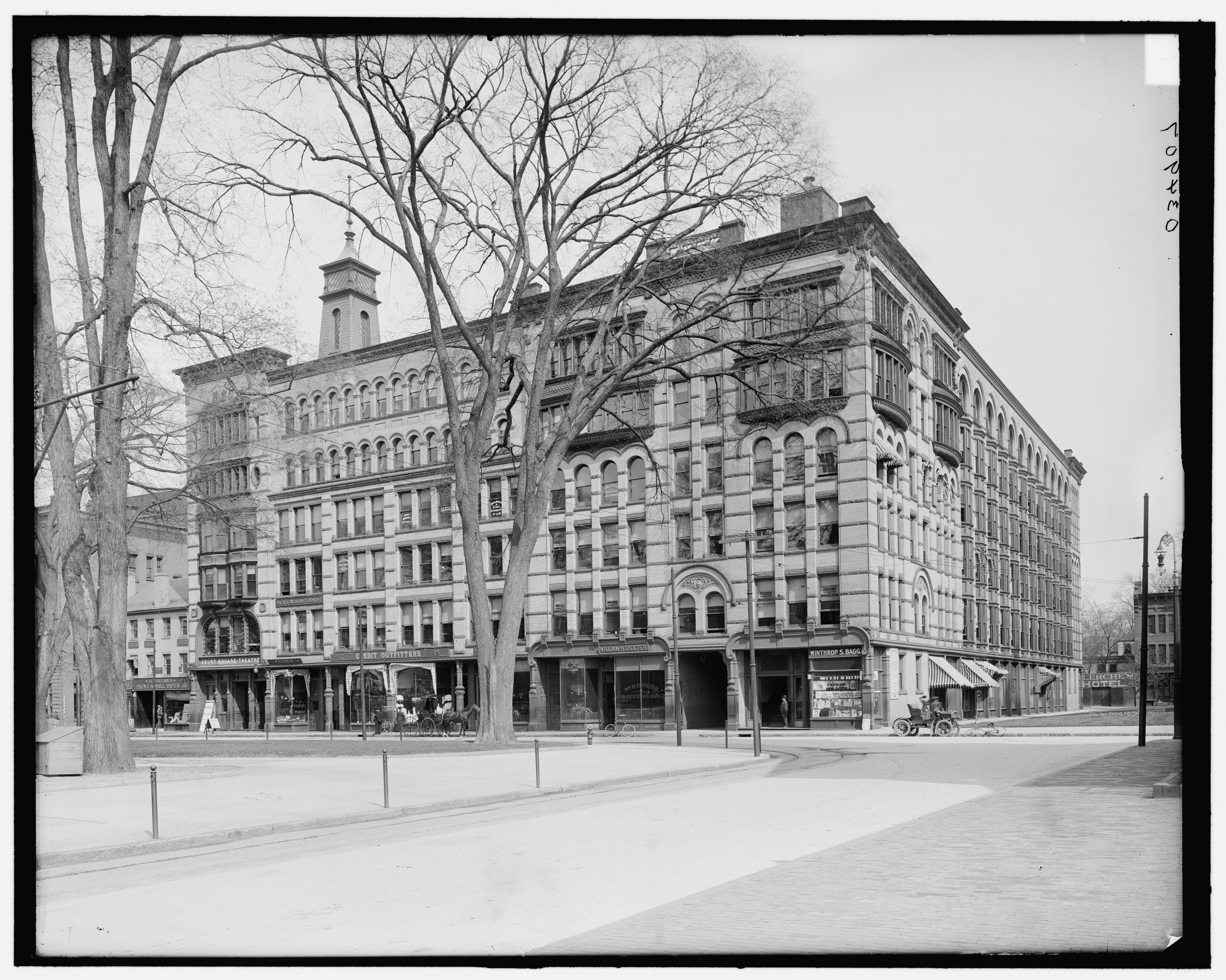
The Court Square Theatre in Springfield, Massachusetts, between 1900 and 1910

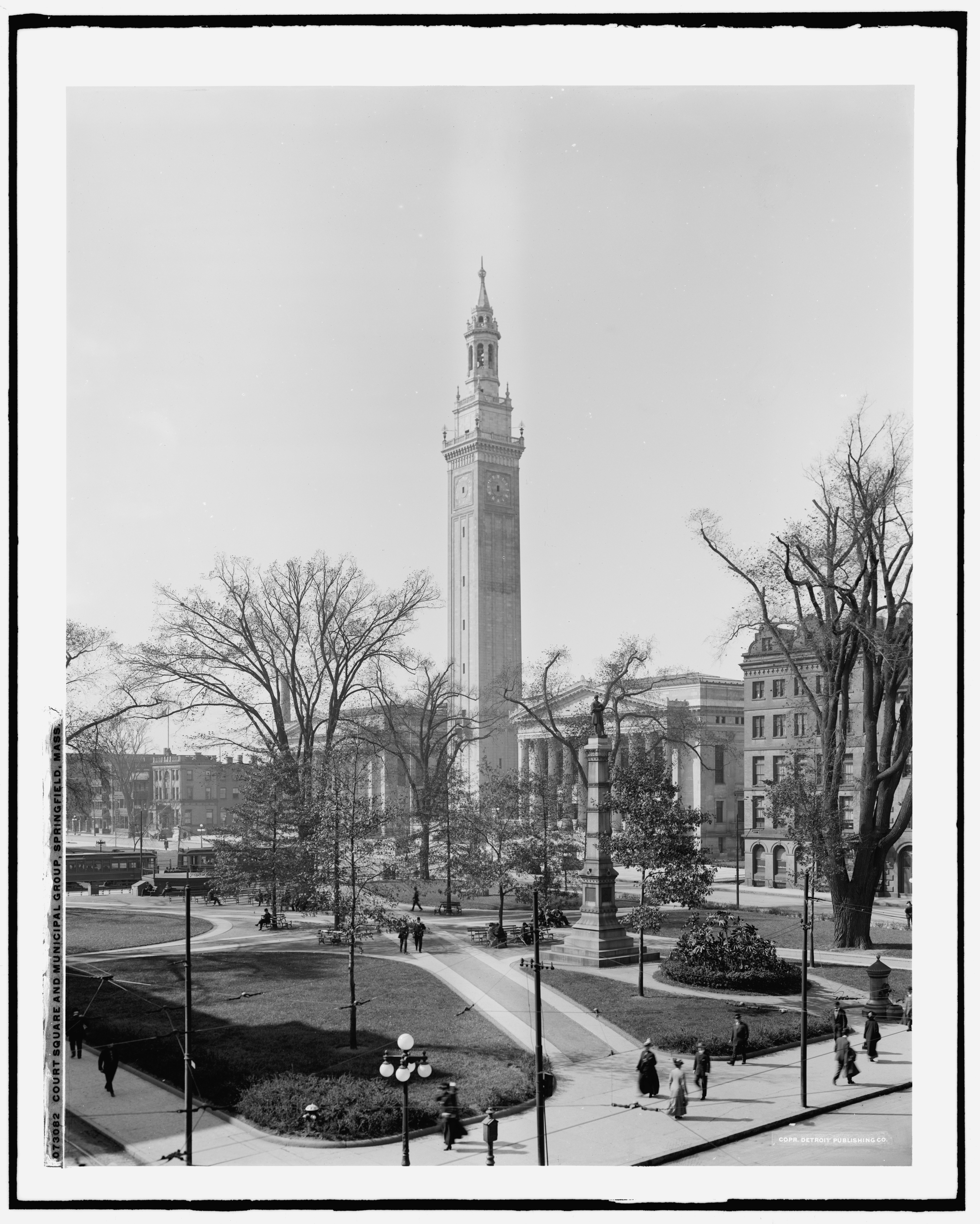
The Springfield Municipal Group, seen from Court Square in Springfield, Massachusetts, between 1913 and 1920.

Two historic towers at Court Square in downtown Springfield, Massachusetts on 26 May 2019.

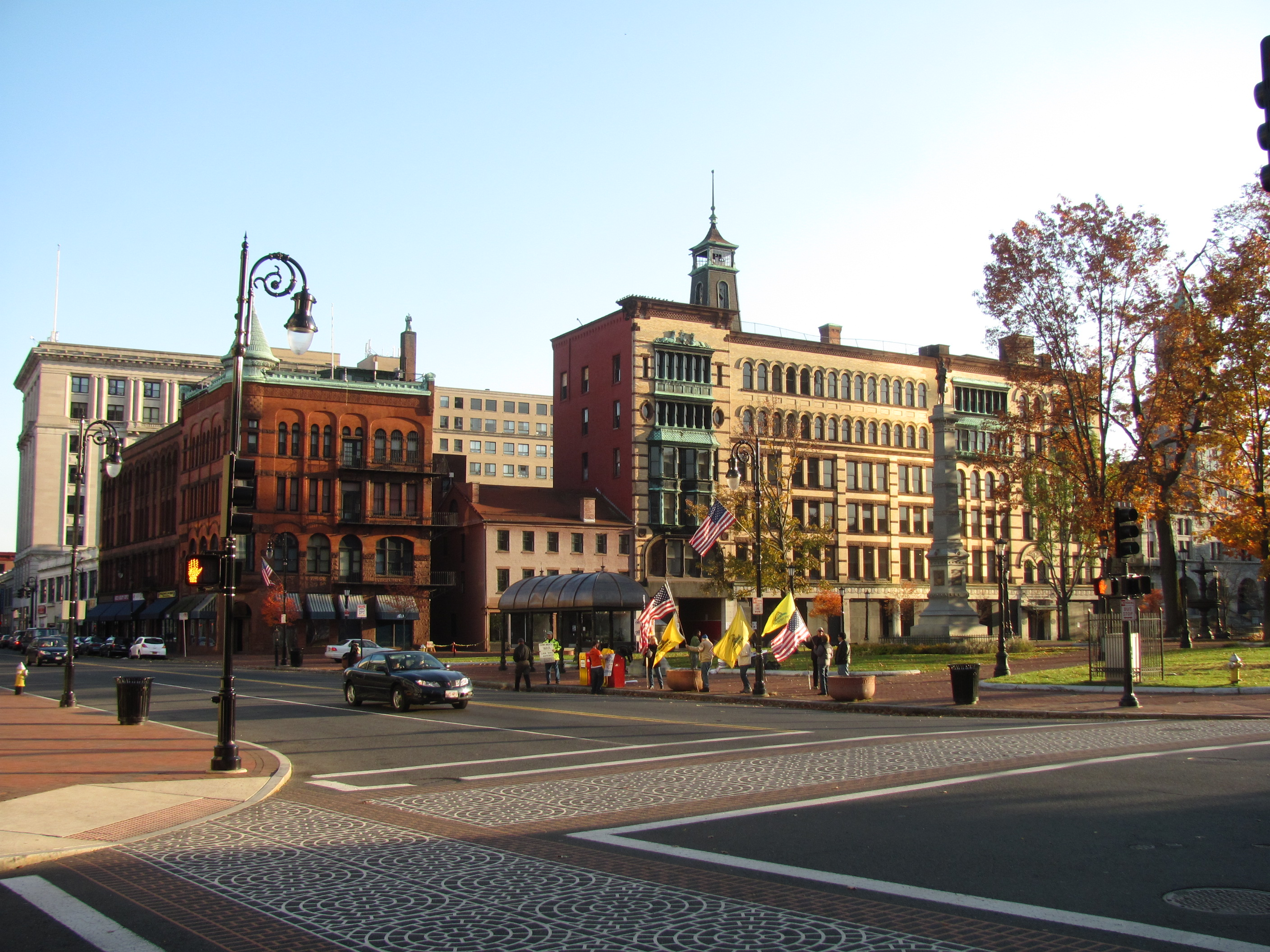
View of the former Court Sq. Theatre building on 12 November 2011.

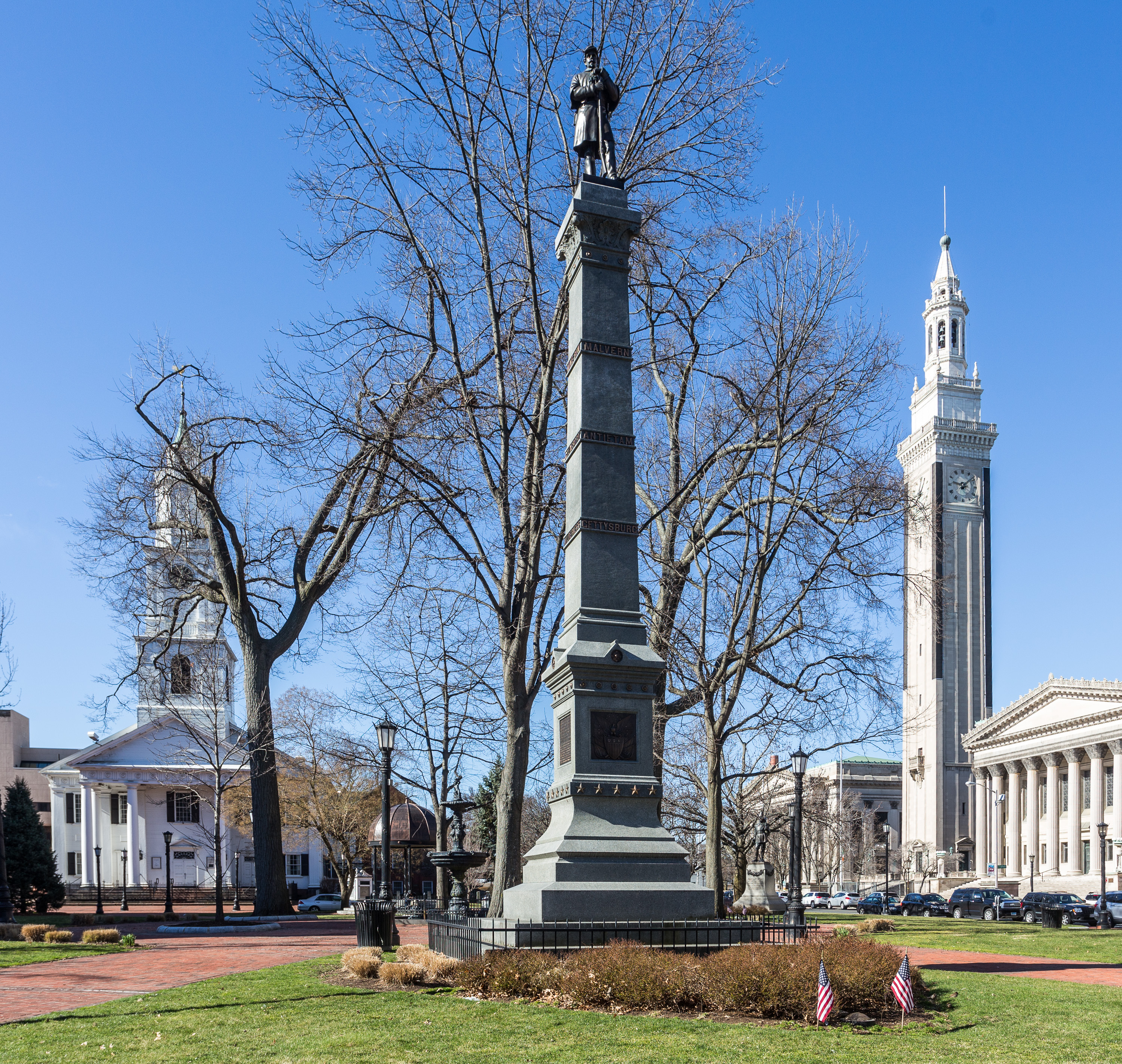
Civil War Monument and Court Square in Springfield Massachusetts on 19 March 2016.

== See also ==
- National Register of Historic Places listings in Springfield, Massachusetts
- National Register of Historic Places listings in Hampden County, Massachusetts
