= Monarch Place =

Building in Springfield, Massachusetts

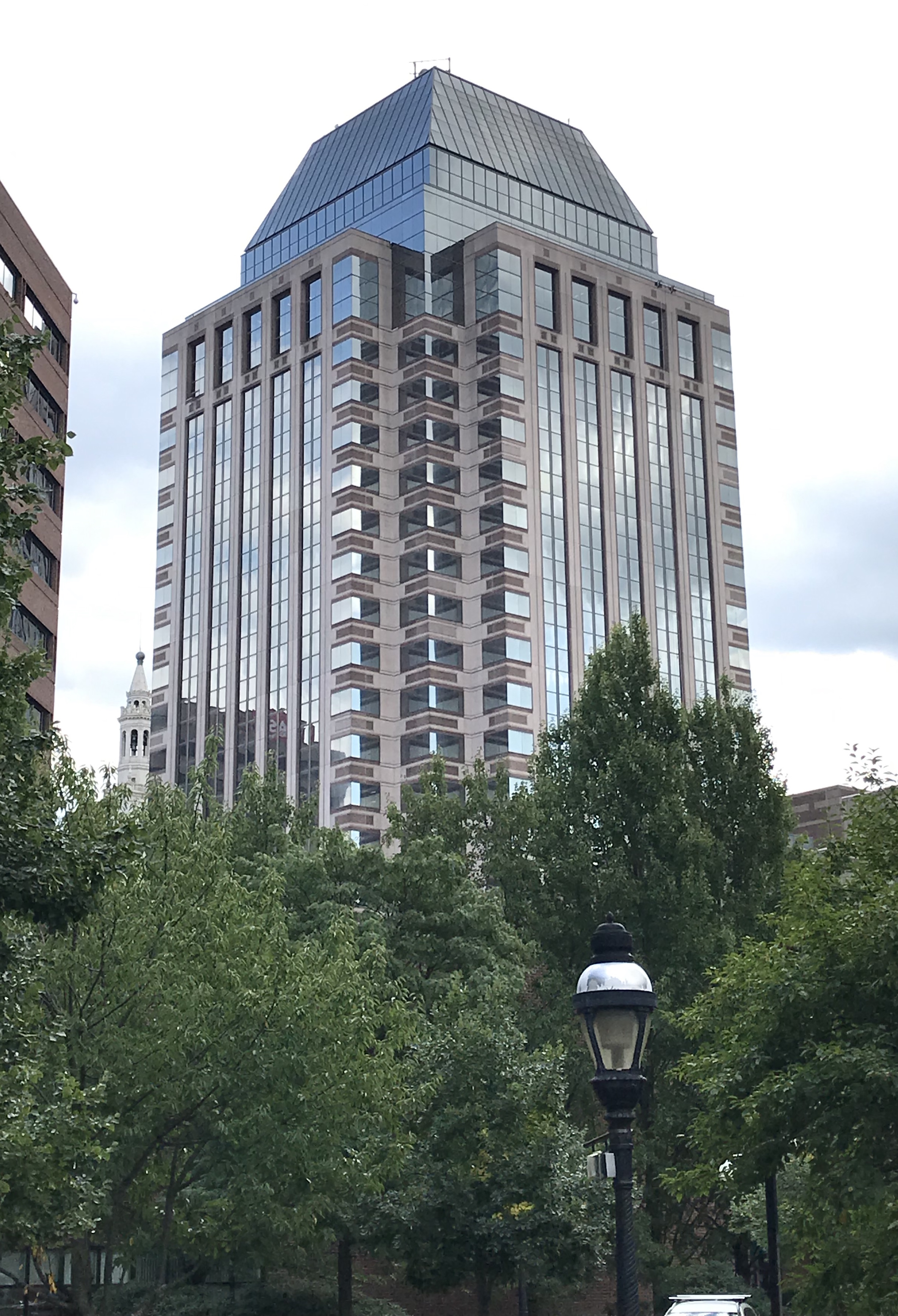
- The main tower of Monarch Place, as seen from Steiger Park

General information
- Type: Commercial office
- Architectural style: Postmodern
- Location: 1 Monarch Place, Springfield, Massachusetts 01144, United States
- Construction started: 1987
- Completed: 1989
- Cost: $120 million (1989 USD)
- Owner: Peter L. Picknelly

Height
- Roof: 401 ft (122.2 m)

Technical details
- Floor count: 26
- Floor area: 400,000 ft^{2} (37,000 m^{2})

Design and construction
- Architect: Jung Brannen Associates
- Developer: Monarch Capital Group and Assoc.
- Structural engineer: Weidlinger Associates
- Main contractor: Daniel O'Connell Sons, of Holyoke

Website
- www.monarch-place.com

Monarch Place is a skyscraper with ground-floor retail spaces, located in Springfield, Massachusetts. Monarch Place is the tallest building in Springfield, the tallest building in Massachusetts outside of Boston, and the eighth tallest building in New England outside of Boston. Originally built by the namesake Monarch Capital Corporation, at the time of its completion in 1989 it was the largest mixed-use development in Massachusetts outside of Boston.

== History ==
Monarch Place was built on the site of the Forbes and Wallace Inc. Department Store, commencing construction in 1987. In a tribute to preserve the heritage of Forbes and Wallace, whose flagship store had stood at that site for decades, the architects Jung Brannen and Associates developed a replica of that building's facade, used in tandem with a fountain at a plaza at the corners of Main and Boland. The building was originally constructed as a joint venture between the Monarch Capital Corporation's "Forge Springfield" subsidiary, Flatley Springfield of Braintree, and Sheraton Hotels at a cost of $120 million. After Monarch Capital's bankruptcy in 1991, the building was sold at auction for $24 million to Peter L. Picknelly, of Peter Pan Buslines, whose company has managed it since.

Since 1989, working with the Massachusetts Division of Fisheries and Wildlife, the building has on-and-off served as the site of a nesting pair of peregrine falcons, making it one of three reintroduction sites on buildings in Western Massachusetts, including the UMass Campus Center site which subsequently was moved to the W.E.B. DuBois Library in Amherst.

== Tenants ==
As of December 2021, tenants include:

- Argo Group
- Bank of America
- Catuogno Court Reporting Services
- Community Legal Aid
- Doherty, Wallace, Pillsbury & Murphy, P.C.
- First American Title Insurance
- Health New England
- Irene E. & George A. Davis Foundation
- Kanzaki Specialty Papers
- Mahoney and Associates
- Manpower Temporary Services
- Merrill Lynch
- Michael D. Parker Law Offices
- Moriarty & Primack, P.C.
- Robert Half International Inc.
- Schwerin & Boyle
- Sinclair Insurance Group, Inc.
- Skoler, Abbott & Presser, P.C.
- Sullivan, Hayes & Quinn
- The Travelers Indemnity Company
- UBS Financial

== Gallery ==
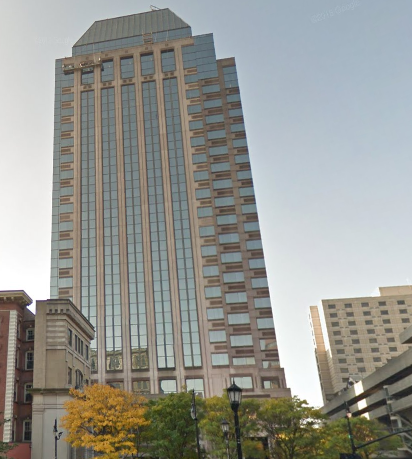
The Monarch Place tower and ground structure seen from Main Street

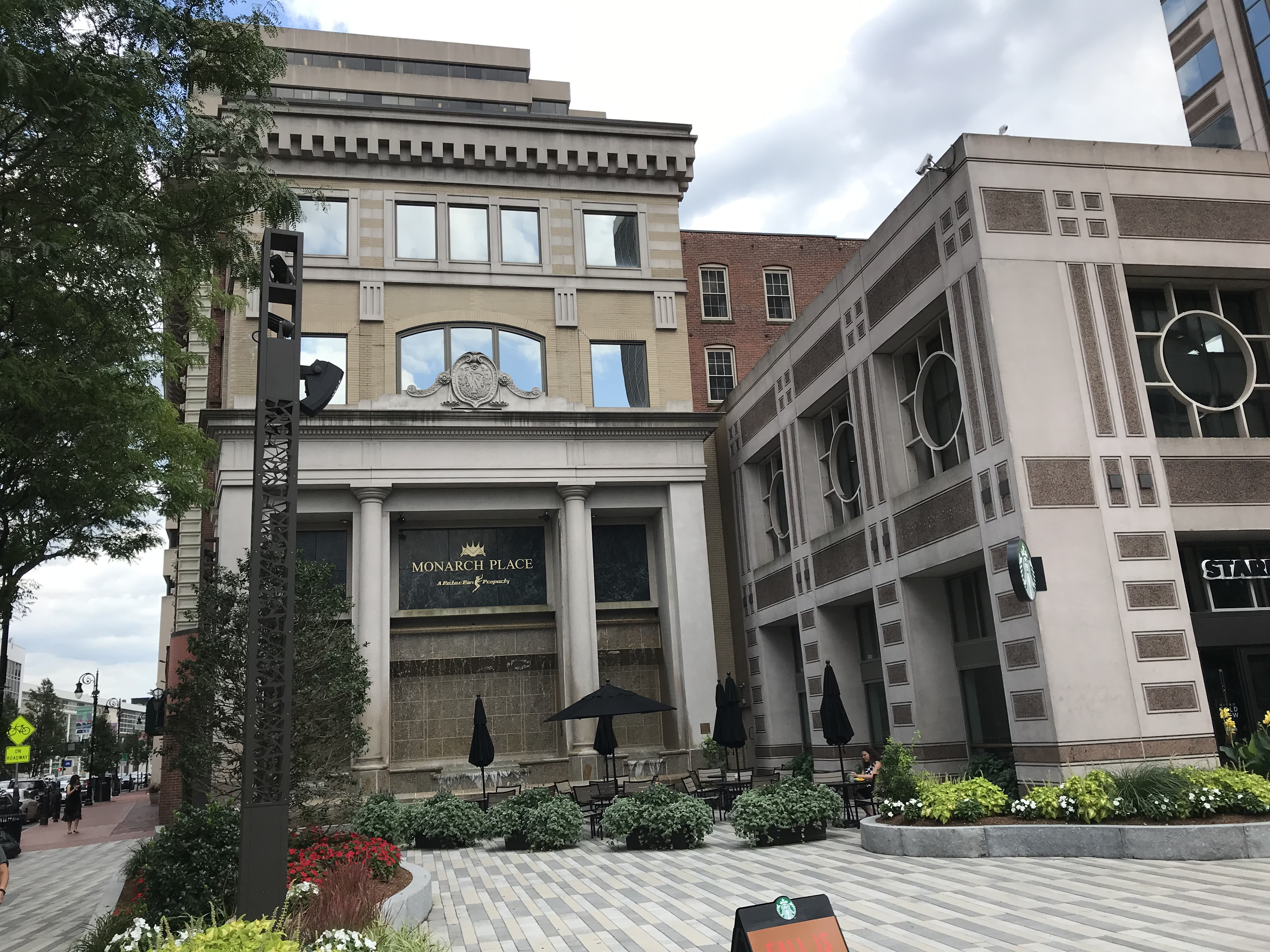
Forbes & Wallace plaza, modeled after the department store which once stood on the site

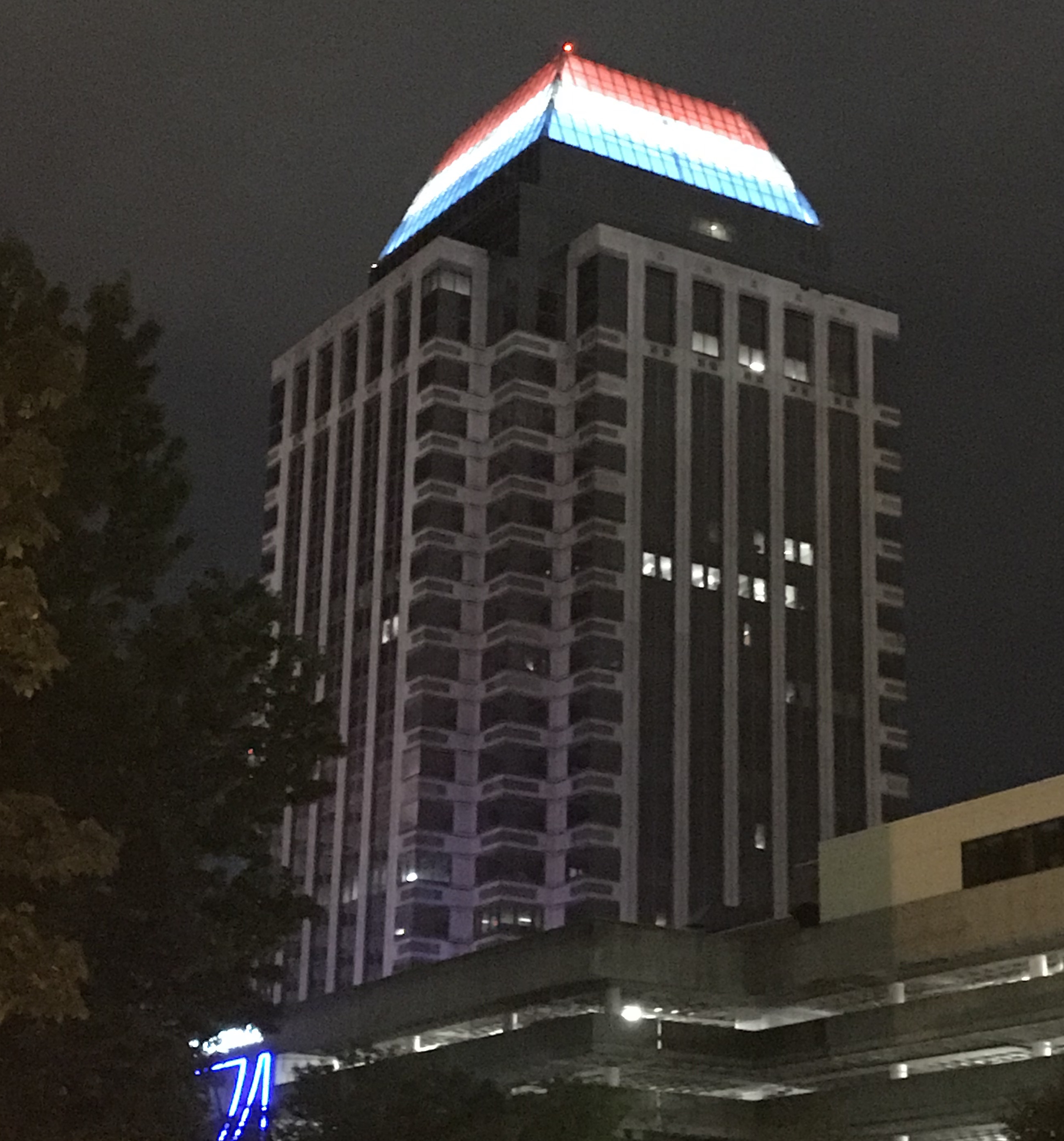
With illuminated frustum crown at night

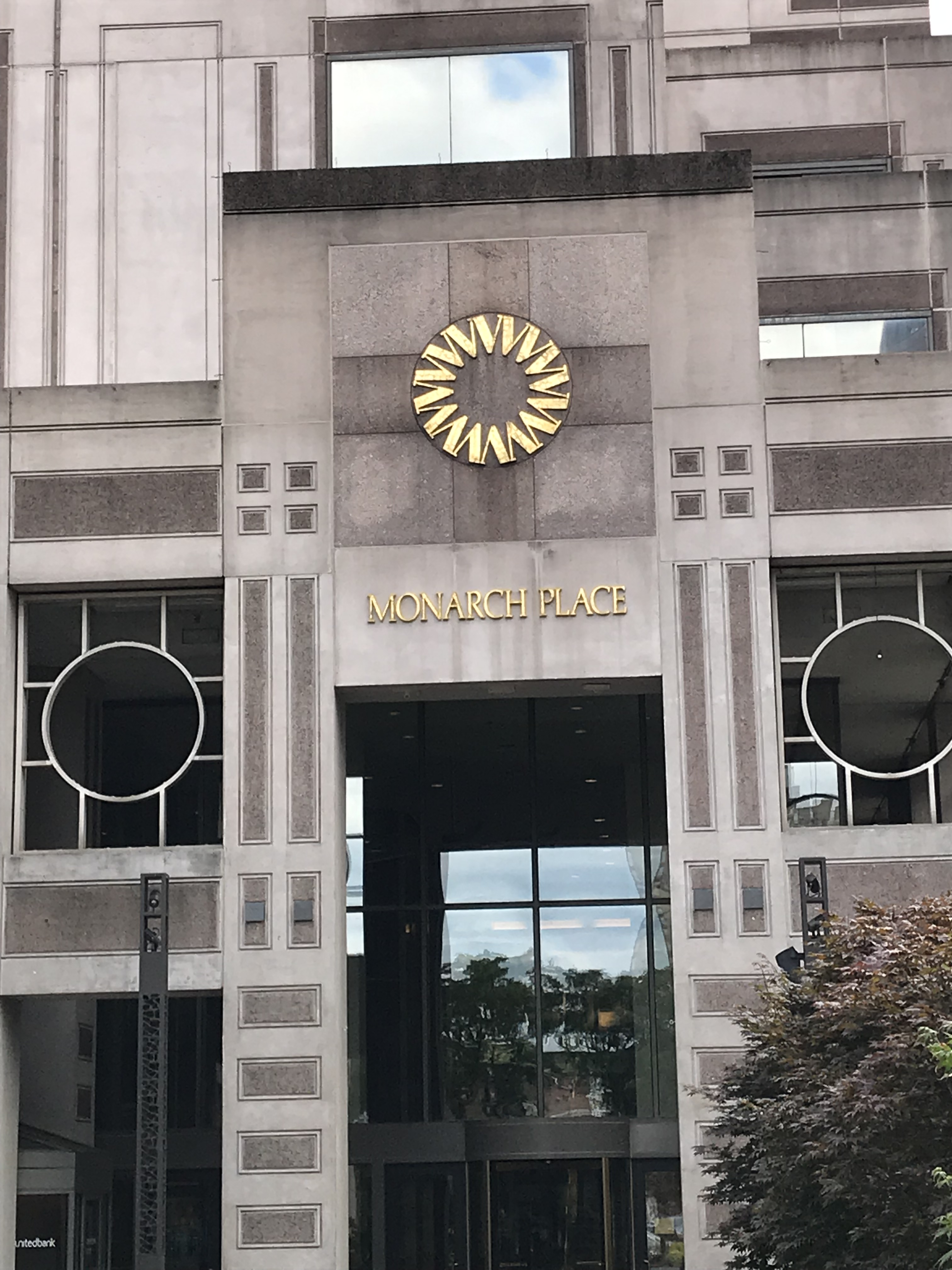
Main entryway and logo

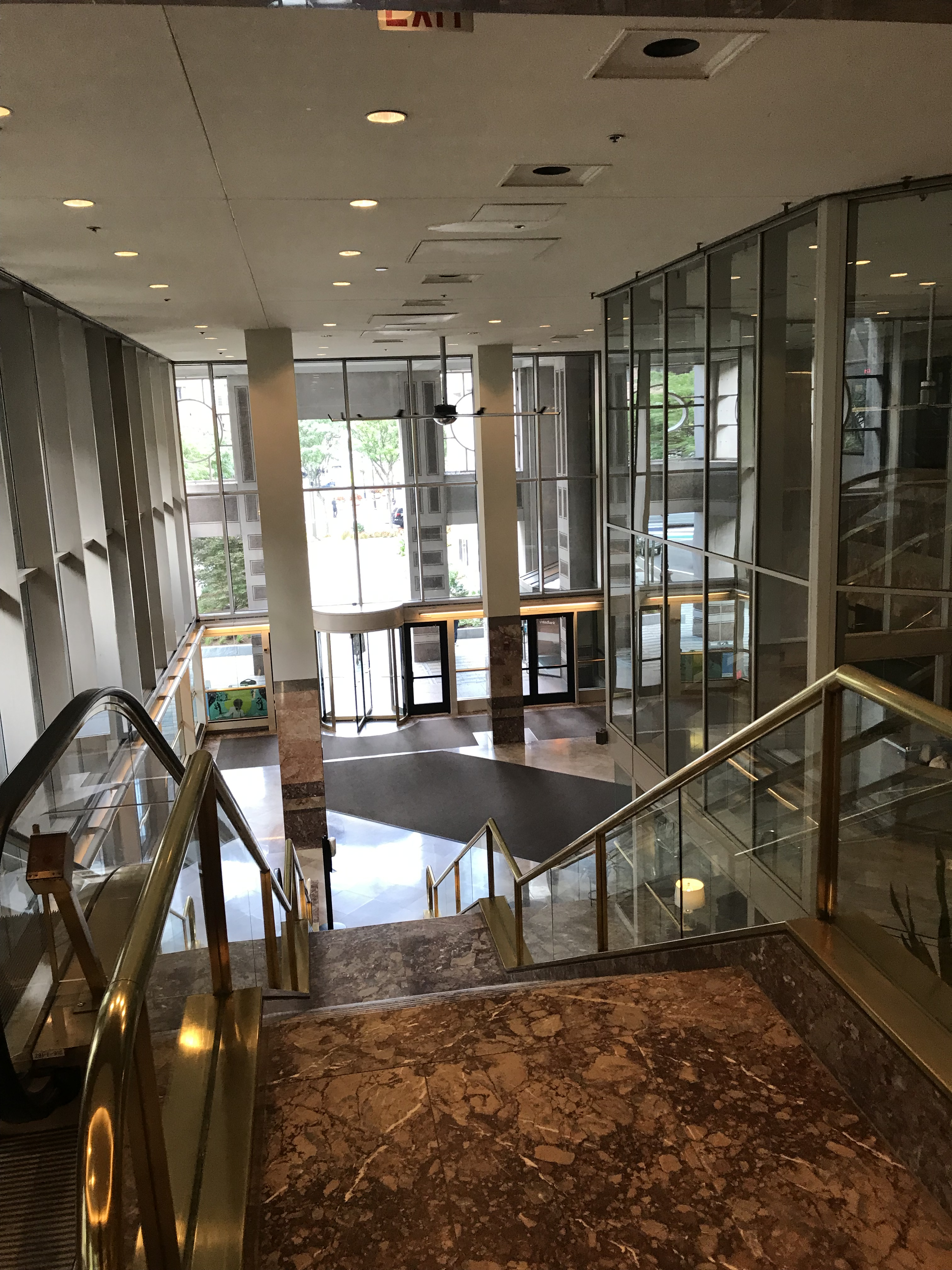
Lobby and marble staircase

== See also ==
- Metro Center, Springfield, Massachusetts
- Tower Square
