= Jenny Williams =

Jenny Williams may refer to:

- Jenny Williams (academic), author and academic at Dublin City University
- Jenny Ruiz-Williams
- Jenny Williams (sportsperson) (born 1957), Australian sports psychologist and athlete
- Jenny Cumfry Williams, formerly enslaved 19th-century American woman

== See also ==
- Jenni Williams, Zimbabwean human rights activist
- Jennifer Williams (disambiguation)
