= Jennifer Williams (disambiguation) =

Jennifer Williams is an American diplomat.

Jennifer Williams may also refer to:

- Jennifer Williams (gymnast), Swedish artistic gymnast
- Jen Williams, British writer
- Jennifer Williams (politician), New Jersey politician
- Jennifer Williams, American television personality (Basketball Wives)
- Jennifer Williams (The Grudge), a character of the 2004 horror film The Grudge, played by Clea DuVall
- Jennifer "Jenny" Williams, daughter of film composer John Williams
