= Jennifer Williams (politician) =

New Jersey politician (born 1968)

Member of the Trenton, New Jersey City Council
- Incumbent
- Assumed office January 1, 2023
- Preceded by: Marge Caldwell-Wilson

Personal details
- Born: 1968 (age 57–58) Trenton, New Jersey
- Party: Republican
- Education: La Salle University; Tulane University

Jennifer Williams (born 1968) is an American politician serving on the Trenton, New Jersey city council. She is the first transgender person elected to a city council in New Jersey.

== Early life ==
Williams was born in Trenton, the youngest of seven children. She graduated from La Salle University with a degree in marketing, and received her Master of Business Administration from Tulane University.

== Political career ==
=== Involvement in Republican politics ===
Williams attended the 2016 Republican National Convention as an honorary delegate from New Jersey, making her the sole transgender delegate present. She also attended the Conservative Political Action Conference in 2017, 2018, and 2019 to advocate for the LGBTQ+ community as a conservative. Despite the Republican Party's opposition to transgender rights, Williams has stated she sees it as her responsibility to fight for those rights within the party and reach out to people who might not have otherwise met a transgender person. “I actually believe, if you’re transgender, one of the most conservative things you can do is live your authentic self,” she said; "The government should not have a right to tell you who you should love, who you can be or what kind of future life that you can have."

Williams served as chair of the Trenton Republican Committee from 2016 to 2023. In 2019, she ran for the New Jersey General Assembly as a Republican, but was defeated in the general election.

=== Trenton City Council ===
Williams served on Trenton's zoning board from 2008 to 2022, and its chair from 2020 to 2022. In 2022, she was elected in a nonpartisan race to Trenton's City Council to represent the city's North Ward, defeating opponent Algernon Ward Jr. by a single vote. She focused her campaign on municipal issues such as Trenton's 27% poverty rate, abandoned housing in the North Ward, and the need for economic development. In 2024, she was reelected to a full four-year term uncontested.

While in office, Williams has worked to restore the council–mayor working relationship in Trenton after significant dysfunction from 2018–2022. She also dedicated a historic marker in the North Ward for the 1968 riots that followed the assassination of Martin Luther King Jr., and was part of Trenton's vote to oppose any Immigration and Customs Enforcement facilities being housed in the city. On the state level, Williams testified in support of a New Jersey bill to strengthen protections for reproductive and transgender healthcare (previously protected only by executive order), which was passed in June 2026.
