= Jenny Williams (academic) =

Jenny Williams (born 1951) is an author and academic at Dublin City University. She earned a Bachelor of Arts degree in German from Queen's University Belfast in 1974 and a PhD in Medieval Historiography and Heroic Literature in 1979. Until 2007 she was the head of Dublin City University's School of Applied Language and Intercultural Studies.

== Selected works ==
- Etzel der riche, 1981
- Language, Education and Society in a Changing World, Multilingual Matters, 1996
- More Lives Than One: A Biography of Hans Fallada, Libris, 1998
- The Map. A Guide to Doing Research in Translation Studies, St. Jerome, 2002
- Mehr Leben als eins: Hans Fallada: Eine Biographie, Aufbau-Verlag, 2002
- Die Provinz im Leben und Werk von Hans Fallada, Individuell, 2005
