= Jenny Cumfry Williams =

19th-century American woman

- Born: 1778; Schenectady, New York, U.S.
- Spouse: Jack Williams (m. 1802)

Jenny Cumfry Williams (born c. 1778) was a formerly enslaved 19th-century American woman.

== Life ==
Jenny was likely born near Schenectady, New York. Originally enslaved, she escaped and fled to Springfield, Massachusetts in the early 1800s, as the state had abolished slavery in 1783.

On September 2, 1802, Jenny married a Black man named Jack Williams at First Church in Springfield, Massachusetts, in a wedding officiated by Rev. Bezaleel Howard.

In the following years, Williams worked as a washerwoman and became known as "an honest, industrious and useful person," who was well-liked by the community.

In 1808, a man of Dutch descent from Schenectady, New York named Peter Van Geyseling arrived in Springfield and attempted to kidnap Williams, claiming she was his property; he had the paperwork to prove this was true under the laws at the time. Rev. Howard and 18 other Springfield residents negotiated a sale price with Van Geyseling, and raised $100 to buy Williams' freedom. The sale, which referred to Williams as having the alias of Dinah, went through on February 16, 1808, legally transferring Williams' ownership to "the Selectmen of Springfield". This sale may be the earliest example of an American community purchasing the freedom of a slave.

After 1808, Williams and her husband led quiet lives, living in a small cottage beside Goose Pond, in a part of the city called Hayti, now known as Mason Square, where she "dispensed spruce beer for a consideration to the thirsty". According to the 1810 census, a second free person also lived with the couple.

The year and circumstances of Williams' death are unknown.
