= Samuel Chapin =

English-born magistrate and church deacon (1598–1675)

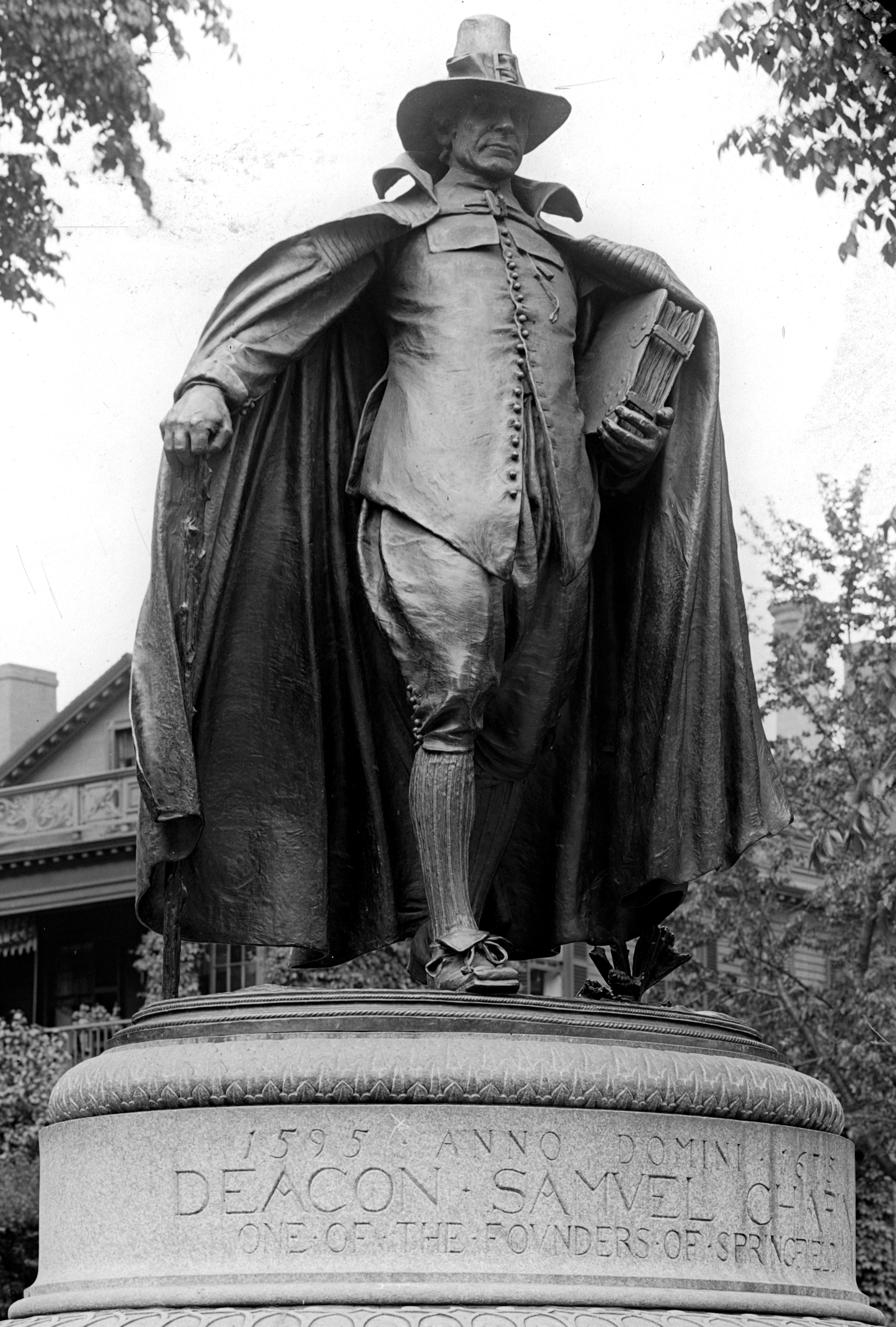
- Statue of Chapin in Springfield, Massachusetts
- Born: c. October 1598; Paignton, Devon, England
- Died: November 11, 1675 (aged 77); Springfield, Massachusetts Bay Colony, English America
- Occupations: Magistrate; selectman; church deacon
- Spouse: Cicely Penny (m. 1623)
- Children: 7

Samuel Chapin (c. October 1598 – November 11, 1675) was a prominent early settler of Springfield, Massachusetts. He served the town as selectman, magistrate and deacon (in the Massachusetts Bay Colony there was little separation between the church and government). Chapin is best known today as the subject of the Augustus Saint-Gaudens sculpture entitled Deacon Samuel Chapin (also known as The Puritan).

== Life ==
Chapin was born in Paignton (near Torquay), Devon, England, to John Chapin and Phillipe Easton. His baptism is recorded as October 8, 1598.

On February 9, 1623/4, Samuel married Cicely Penny. They had seven children: David, Catherine, Sarah, Josiah, Henry, Japhet and Hannah. The oldest five children were born in England and the last two in Massachusetts, Japhet in Roxbury and Hannah in Springfield.

He immigrated to America either with or shortly after William Pynchon, between 1630 and 1635, and became a full member of John Eliot's congregation at Roxbury (later incorporated into the city of Boston). The Chapins lived in Roxbury till the close of the year 1642, as on 15 of October of that year Japhet was baptized there. Soon after this, however, they must have moved to Springfield, for we find them there in January 1642/3.

On 26 September 1644, Samuel Chapin was chosen for a committee of five to order the prudential affairs of the town. This prudential committee was in reality the first board of Selectmen in Springfield. The Selectmen, or Townsmen as they were sometimes called, were generally five in number. They were elected by a vote of all the freemen of the town at the town meeting, and were to serve for one year. They settled disputes, heard complaints, admitted inhabitants, regulated highways, bridges, fences, finances, etc., and had a general supervision over all the affairs of the town.

Samuel Chapin held the office of Selectman continuously from 26 September 1644, to 22 November 1652, when having taken the oath of a Commissioner, he could no longer serve as Selectman.

After the Massachusetts General Court's displeasure with William Pynchon's heresy, Pynchon had to resign as the magistrate of Springfield in 1651. The office was taken up by his son-in-law, Henry Smith but in the summer of 1652 Pynchon and Smith left for England. In October 1652, Chapin, Pynchon's son John and another Pynchon son-in-law, Elizur Holyoke, were appointed town Commissioners (essentially a board of magistrates). They had full power and authority to govern the inhabitants of Springfield; to hear and determine all cases and offenses, both civil and criminal, and to inflict all punishments not reaching life, limb, or banishment; to give oaths to constables; and to examine witnesses on oath. He apparently held office as a commissioner until 1660/1. Chapin then alternated between being a selectman (1660 and 1663) and a commissioner (1662, 1664 and 1665).

Chapin was actively interested in the church and appears to have been a deacon as early as 1650.

Chapin died in Springfield in November 1675 shortly after the town was devastated in King Philip's War. In October 1675 Chief Metacomet (known as "King Philip") visited the Agawam Indians (of the Pocomtuc tribe) residing within the town and incited them to mount an attack on Springfield. Despite the inhabitants being warned of the attack many of the houses and barns were burned to the ground, as were its saw and grist mills. Cicely survived him by just over seven years, dying in February 1682. All their children grew to adulthood, married, and produced a total of 72 grandchildren, most of whom grew up and married.

== Commemoration ==
In 1881, Chester W. Chapin, a railroad tycoon, congressman and Chapin descendant, commissioned master sculptor Augustus St. Gaudens to produce a work memorializing his ancestor. The sculpture, most commonly known as The Puritan, is currently sited in Springfield's Merrick Park. It emphasizes the piety, and perhaps moral rigidity, of the country's religious founders—evident in the sculpted Chapin's proud pose, certain stride, flowing cape and hefty Bible, as well as his assertive use of a walking cane. Smaller variants of the same work can be found in several museums.

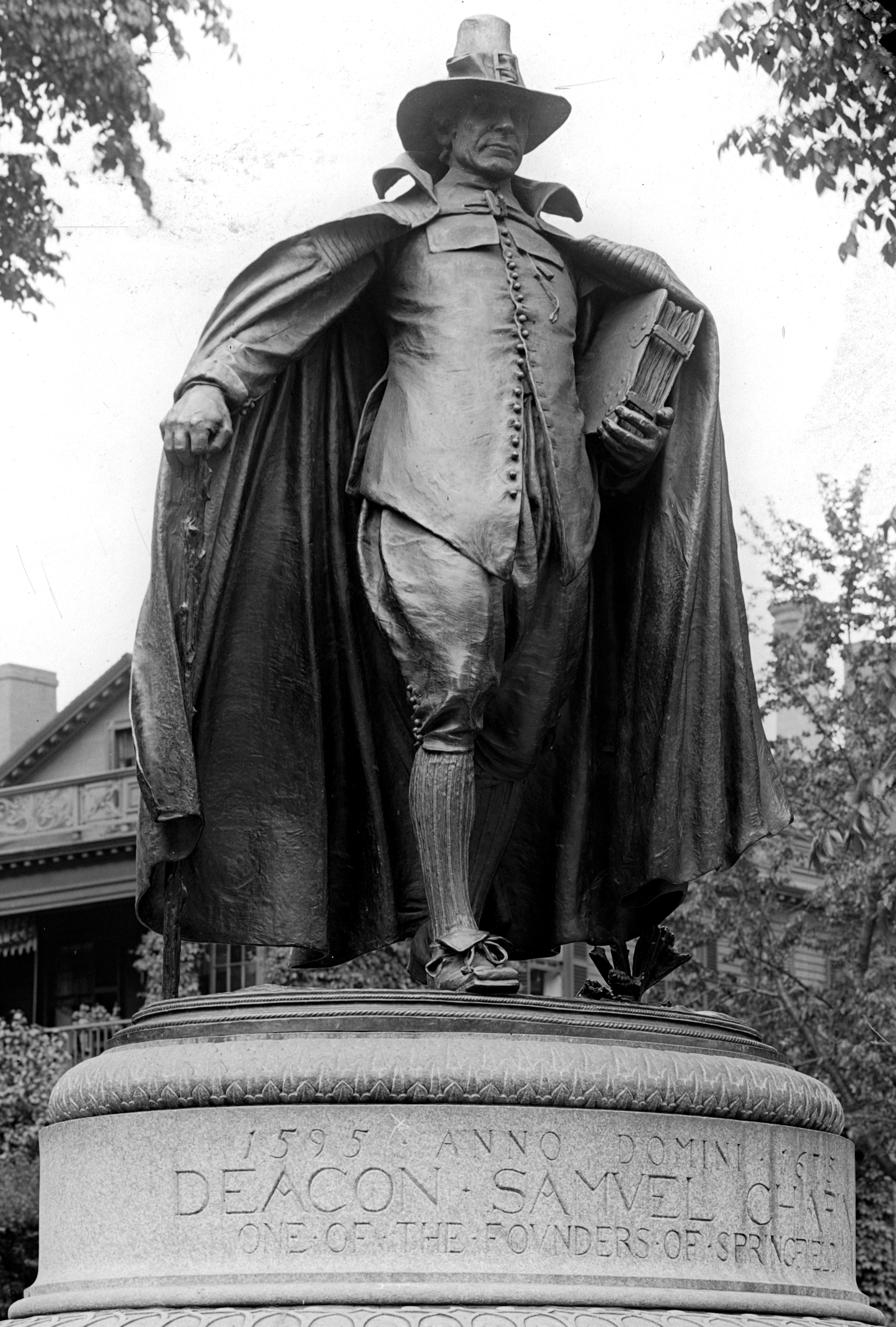
The Puritan, completed by Augustus Saint-Gaudens in Springfield, Massachusetts in 1887. Photographed in 1905.

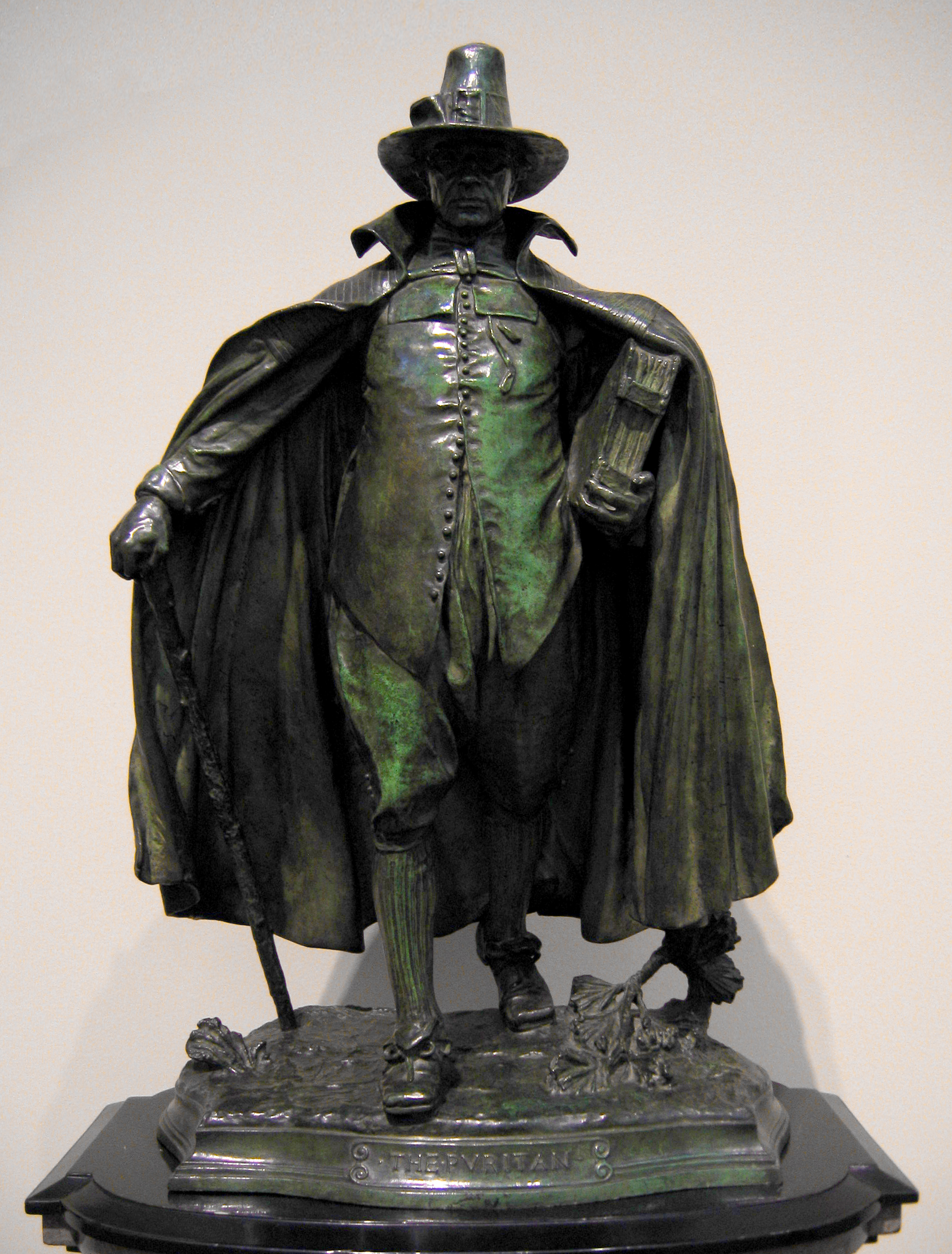
Deacon Samuel Chapin, a small version of the statue in the Metropolitan Museum of Art collection.

== Descendants ==
Samuel Chapin had many famous direct descendants, including singer Taylor Swift, United States Presidents Grover Cleveland and William Howard Taft, Canadian Prime Minister Richard Bedford Bennett, abolitionist and author Harriet Beecher Stowe, abolitionists Henry Ward Beecher and John Brown, financier J.P. Morgan, poet and playwright T.S. Eliot, auto industry pioneer Roy D. Chapin and auto executive Roy D. Chapin Jr., American painter James Ormsbee Chapin, and James Ormsbee's son, jazz drummer Jim Chapin, and his sons, singers Harry Chapin, Tom Chapin and Steve Chapin; singer Mary Chapin Carpenter; banker Timothy J. Sloan; Dwight L. Chapin; engineer C. Chapin Cutler and world champion sailor Dave Chapin; Aaron Chapin. And many non-famous descendants as well.

== See also ==
- History of Springfield, Massachusetts
- Other early settlers of Springfield:
  - William Pynchon
  - Elizur Holyoke
  - Miles Morgan
