= Stearns Square =

Coordinates: 42.1046°N 72.5911°W

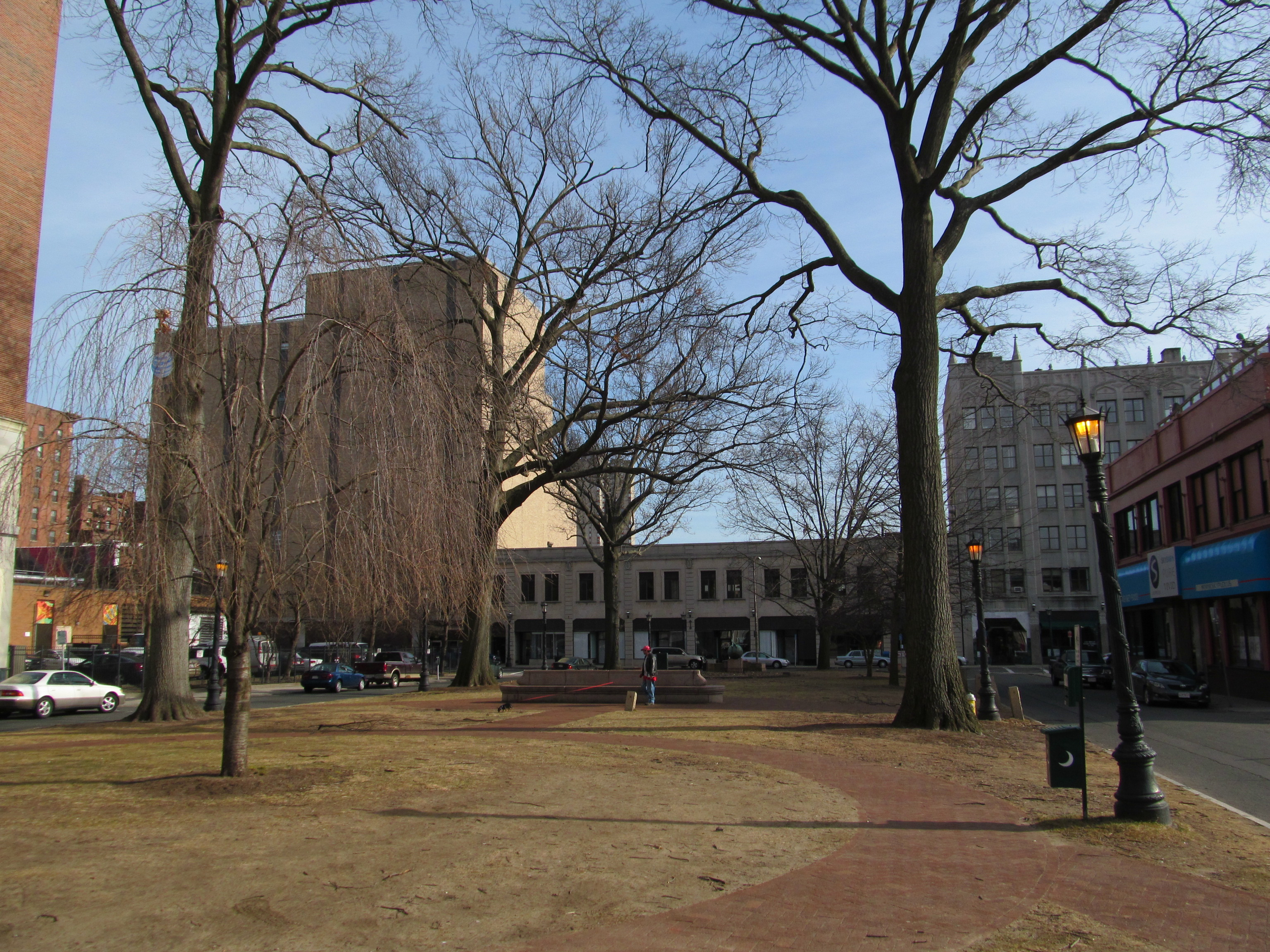
Stearns Square

Stearns Square is an urban, city square located in Springfield, Massachusetts, United States, in the heart of Metro Center's Club Quarter. It was designed by the sculptor Augustus Saint-Gaudens and the landscape architect Stanford White, to accompany Saint-Gaudens' statue, The Puritan.

== History ==
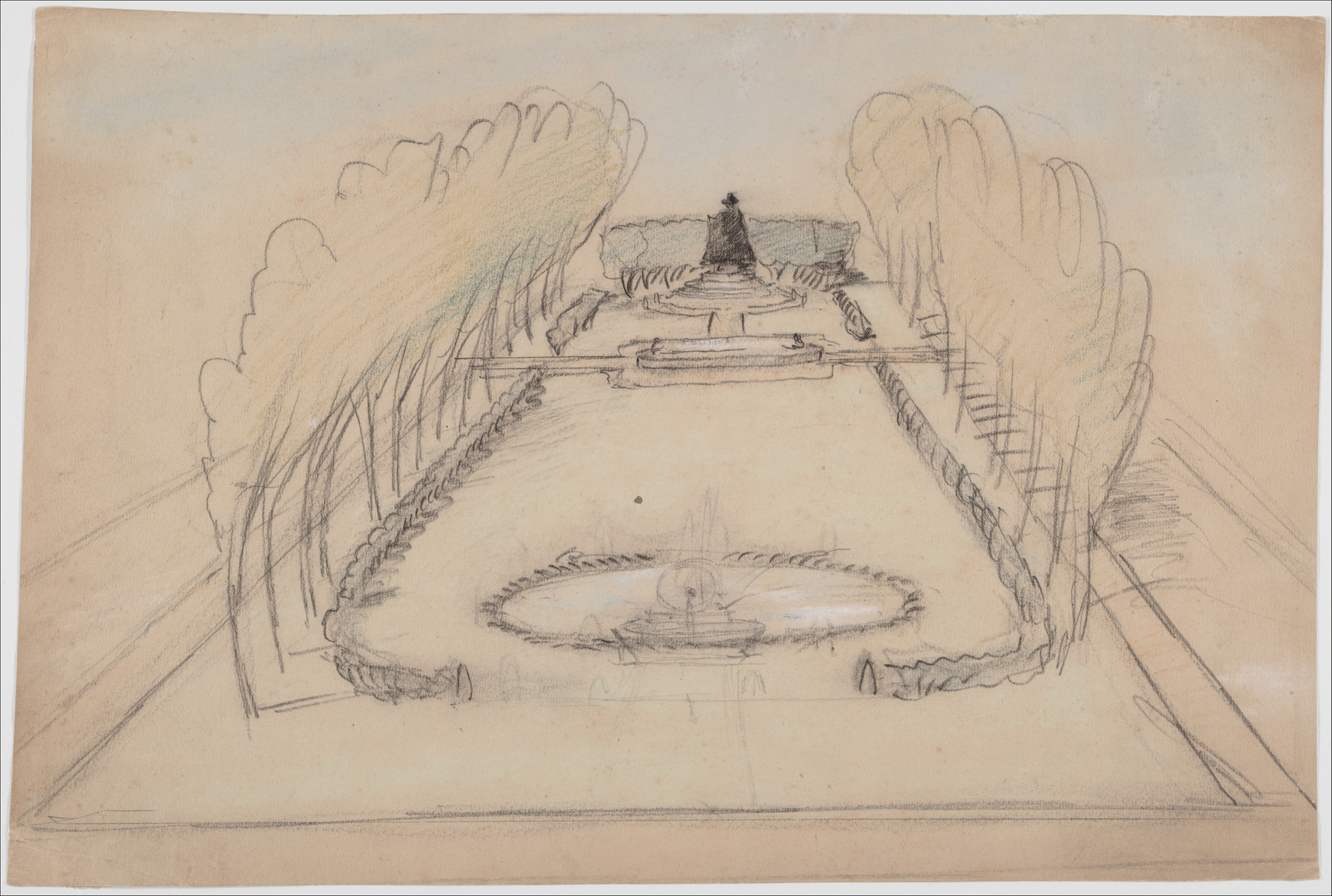
A perspective sketch of Stearns Square by Stanford White, showing The Puritan's original placement along with the bench, trails, and Turtle Fountain.

Augustus Saint Gaudens' The Puritan and Stanford White's planned landscape environment were meant to aid in the transformation of northern Metro Center Springfield from a neighborhood of immigrant housing into a grandiose district, with a state-of-the-art railroad station, (the grand Union Station,) a famous theater, (The Paramount;) and luxury hotels such as the Hotel Kimball. The park and the statue were unveiled on Thanksgiving, 1887. Then, however, as now, the area was Springfield's bawdy Club Quarter, and thus by December 1888, the landscaped environment and the viewing enclave's intent had been destroyed. By 1899 the Deacon Chapin figure had been moved into Merrick Park located just outside the Quadrangle. The other accouterments created for Stearns Square were placed in storage. Unfortunately, no trace remained of the architect and sculptor's landscaped arena and their socializing intent.
