= The Puritan (statue) =

Bronze statue by Augustus St. Gaudens

Coordinates: 42.10306°N 72.58527°W

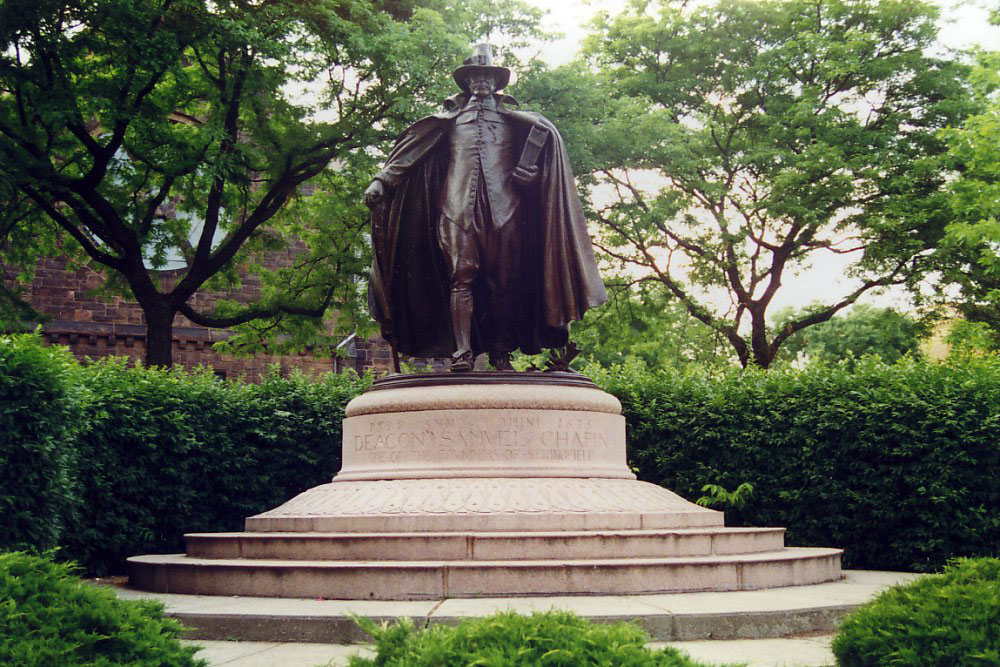
The Puritan

The Puritan is a bronze statue by sculptor Augustus Saint-Gaudens in Springfield, Massachusetts, which became so popular that it was reproduced for over 20 other cities, museums, universities, and private collectors around the world, and later became an official symbol of the city, emblazoned on its municipal flag. Originally designed to be part of Stearns Square, since 1899 the statue has stood at the corner of Chestnut and State Street next to The Quadrangle.

== History ==
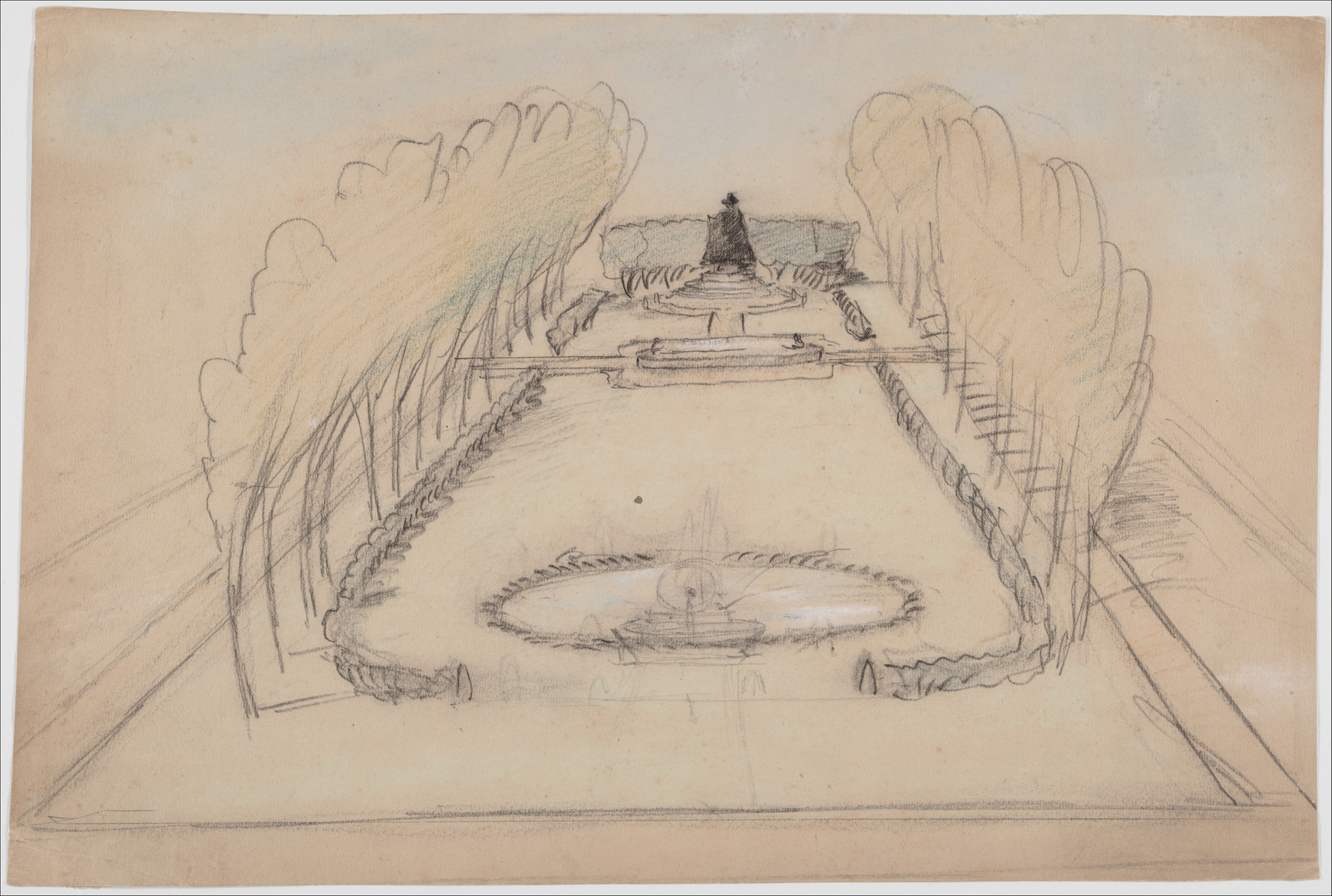
A perspective sketch of Stearns Square by Stanford White, showing the statue's original placement along with the bench, trails, and Turtle Fountain. A tree now stands in its place at the original location.

Flag of the City of Springfield, Massachusetts

In 1881, Chester W. Chapin, a railroad tycoon and congressman from Springfield, Massachusetts, commissioned the renowned sculptor Augustus Saint-Gaudens to create a bronze likeness of his ancestor, Deacon Samuel Chapin (1595–1675), one of the early settlers of the City of Springfield. By 1881, Springfield had become one of America's most innovative industrial and manufacturing centers, and was one of the wealthiest cities in the United States.

The sculpture, which was cast at Bureau Brothers Foundry in Philadelphia, was unveiled on Thanksgiving Day, November 24, 1887 in Stearns Square, between Bridge and Worthington streets. It was a collaboration between Stanford White of the leading architecture firm McKim, Mead, and White, and the sculptor Saint-Gaudens.

The statue featured numerous landscape details to enhance the sculpture. In 1899, the statue was moved to Merrick Park, on the corner of Chestnut and State Streets next to the old city library, which would later become part of Springfield's Quadrangle cultural center, where it has remained. The move was contrary to creators' preference, but one writer for The Republican opined in 1886 that "a position on the city library grounds, on the contrary would exhibit the artist's intent to the best advantage."

In 1983, City Councilor Mary Hurley sought to restore the statue to its original location in Stearns Square. This move was initiated in part due to the restoration of the Turtle Fountain and other fixtures at that location, but the proposal lacked support. Then-mayoral candidate Richard Neal opposed the move, as did the descendants of Deacon Chapin, arguing that the statue had become a fixture of the Quadrangle's museums and that the original move had rescued it from vandalism during its short stay in Stearns Square.

The sculpture now stands next to the Springfield City Library built in 1912. The base is inscribed:

1595 Anno Domini 1675

Deacon Samuel Chapin

One Of The Founders Of Springfield

=== Likeness ===
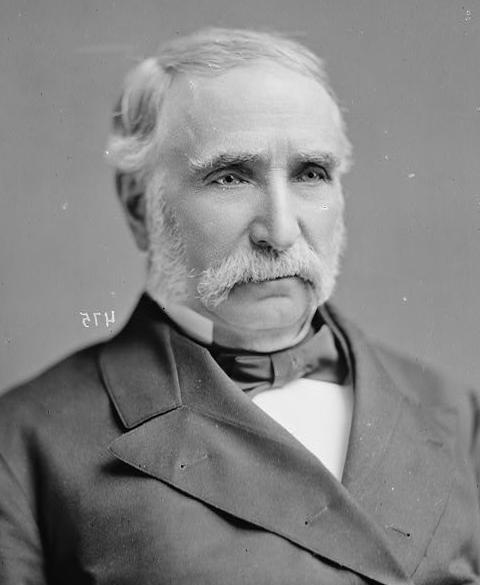
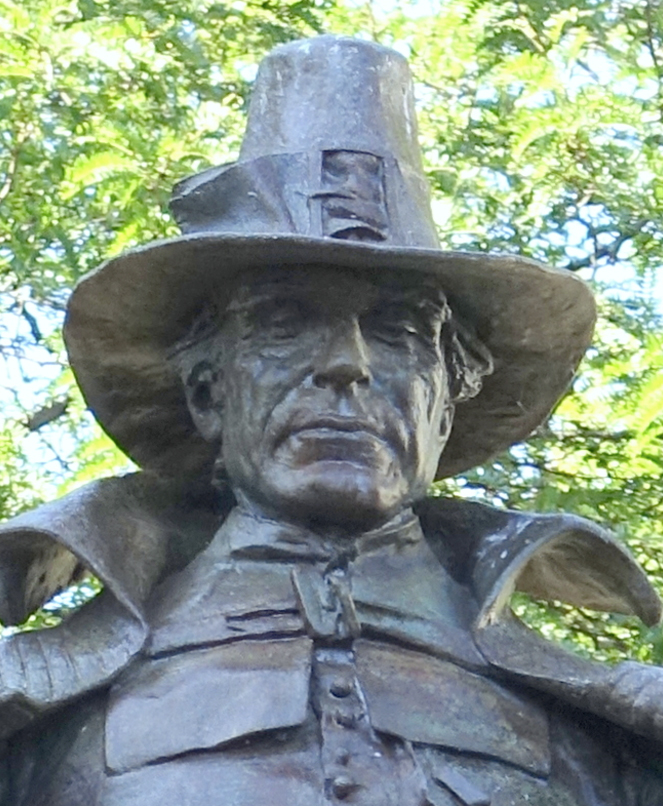
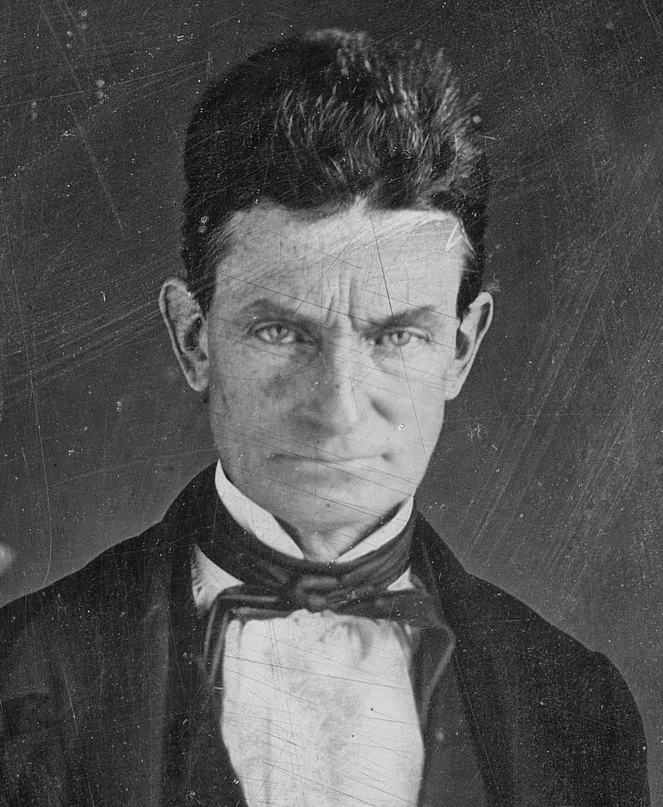
From left to right: portraits of Chester W. Chapin, The Puritan, and John Brown

No authentic portraits of Deacon Samuel Chapin were available for the statue's design. The Saint-Gaudens National Historic Site says it was modeled after Deacon Chapin's descendant Chester W. Chapin, as asserted by the artist himself. However, contemporary accounts also describe the face as "no portrait of any Chapin, but a composite in the sculptor's mind of the family type".

In 2014, Chicopee city historian Stephen Jendrysik submitted the theory that the figure was a surreptitious portrait of the militant abolitionist John Brown, who was also a direct descendant of Deacon Chapin and a devout Calvinist. Brown was a leading militant figure in the escalating tensions between North and South which lead to the American Civil War, and it was in Springfield that Brown first organized the militant Underground Railroad movement, the Subterranean Pass Way with Frederick Douglass and Harriet Tubman. Chester Chapin's business associate Ethan S. Chapin owned the Massasoit Hotel, which acted as a safe house for escaped slaves to hide beneath its staircase, and Brown's lodging prior to his move to the city in the 1840s. Chester Chapin had been a War Democrat himself, paying for the uniforms of 10th Regiment at the start of the Civil War. In John Brown, Abolitionist (2005), historian David S. Reynolds refers to Brown as "The Puritan", as Brown often cited the inspiration of figures such as Jonathan Edwards and Oliver Cromwell. Puritan beliefs strongly influenced the abolitionist movement, and were condemned by divines of the South for their antinomian individualism and rebelliousness. The anti-war congressman Samuel S. Cox considered that "[a]bolition is the offspring of Puritanism [which] introduced the moral elements involved in slavery into politics."

Saint-Gaudens remains best known for his Civil War memorial works, including the Robert Gould Shaw Memorial on Boston Common honoring the 54th Massachusetts Infantry, the first African-American Union regiment. At the monument's unveiling, the singing of the war ballad "John Brown's Body" reminded the sculptor of an emotional moment 30 years prior, when a corps of New England infantry had sung it while marching to war past his office.

The plaster bust of Chester W. Chapin, reportedly used as the model for the face of the statue.

== Popularity ==
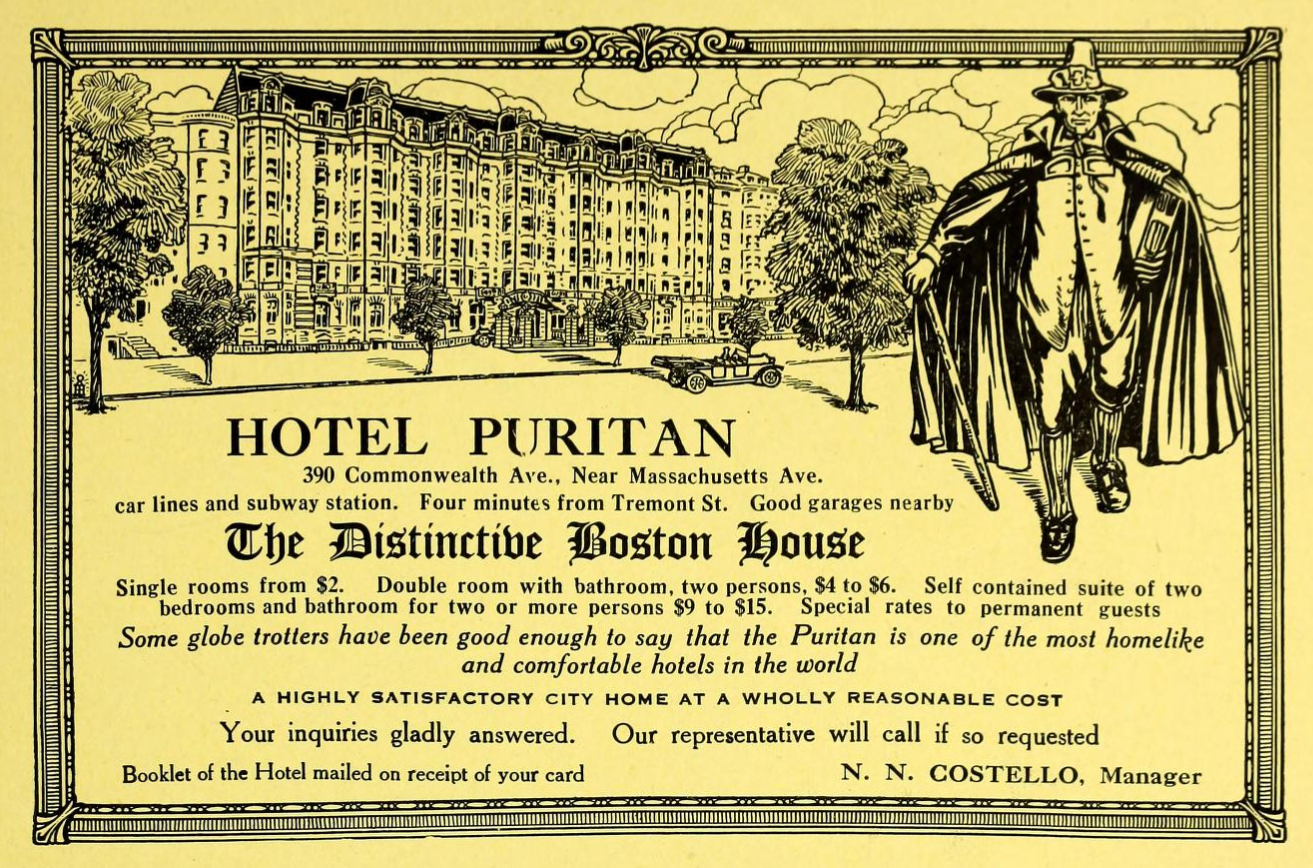
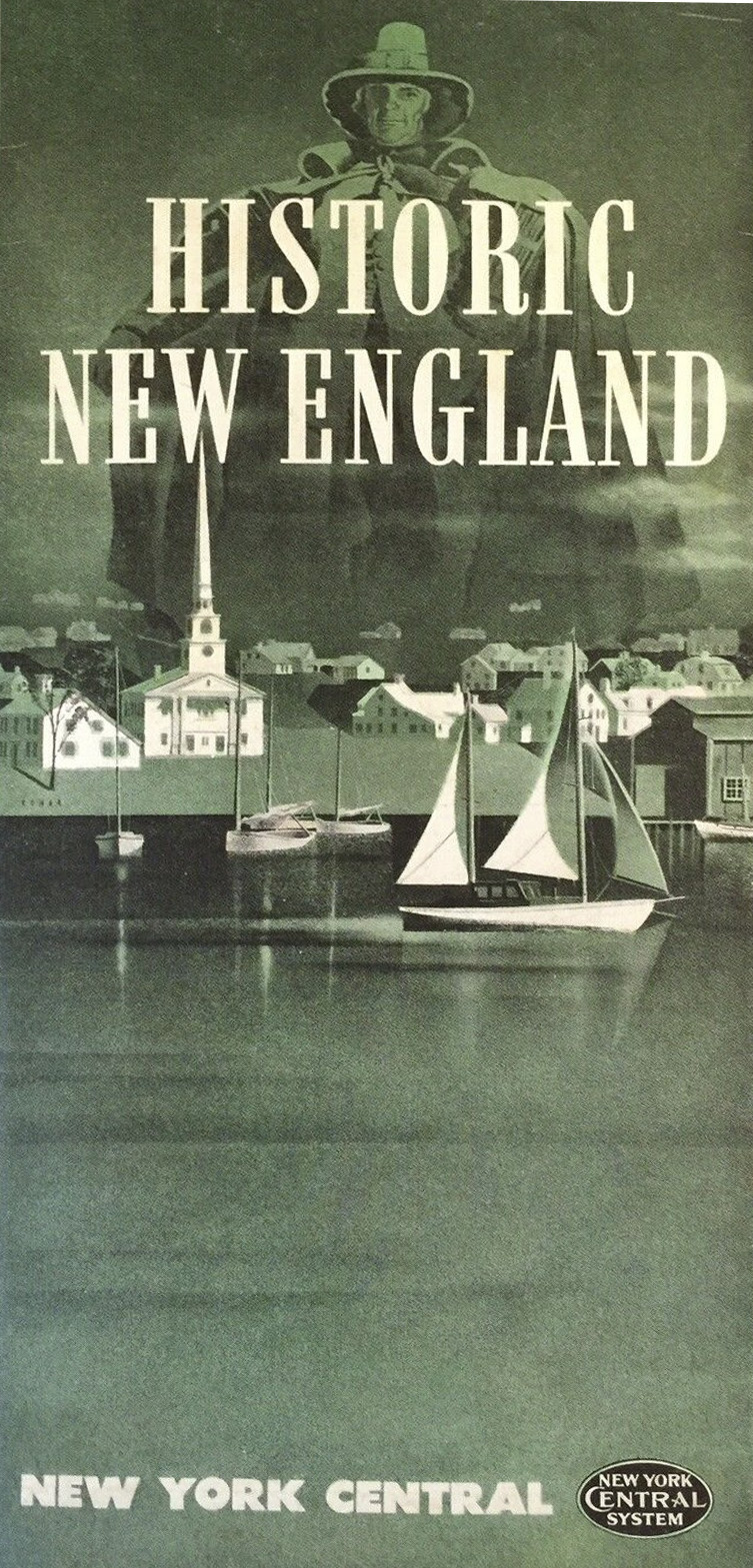
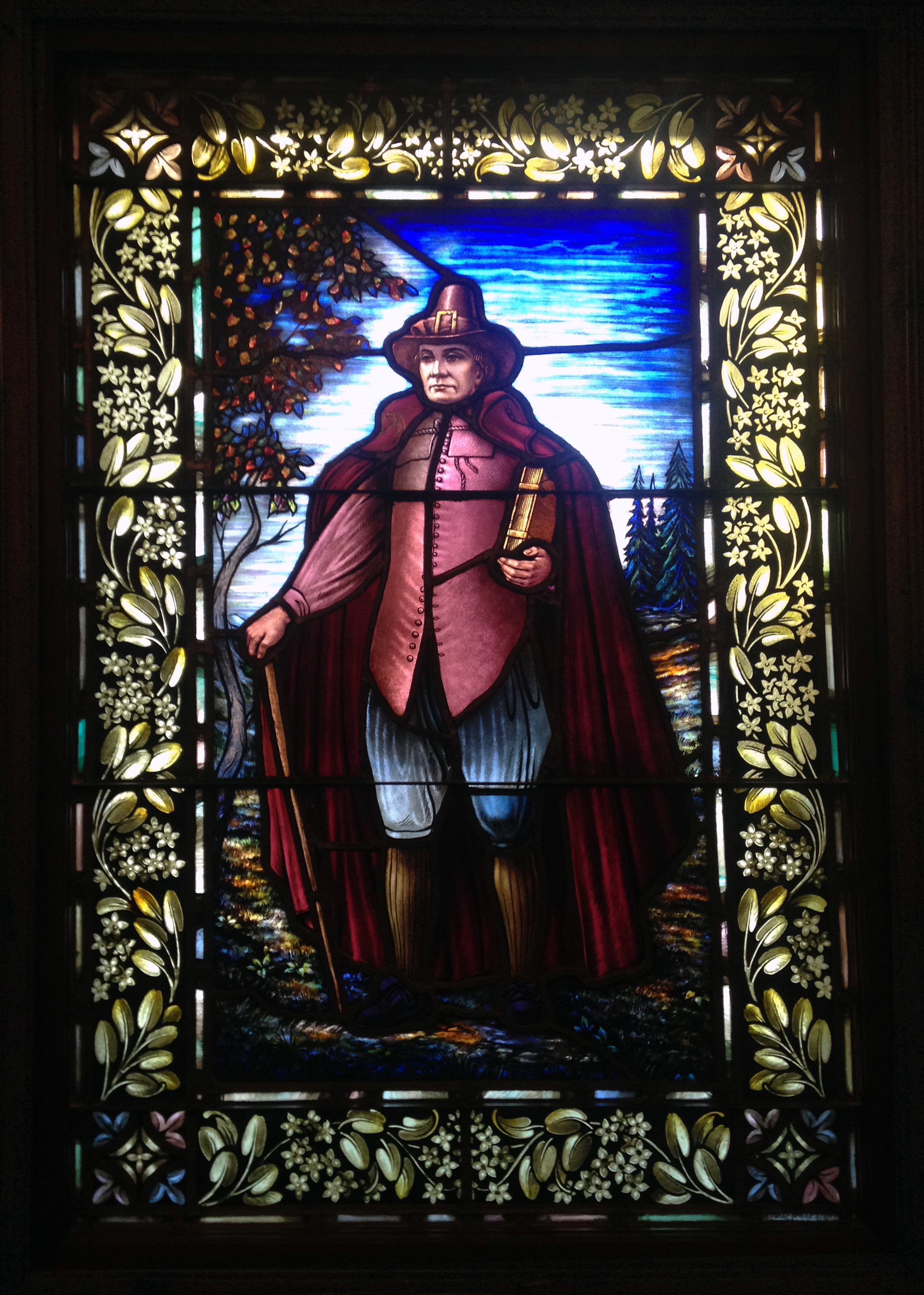
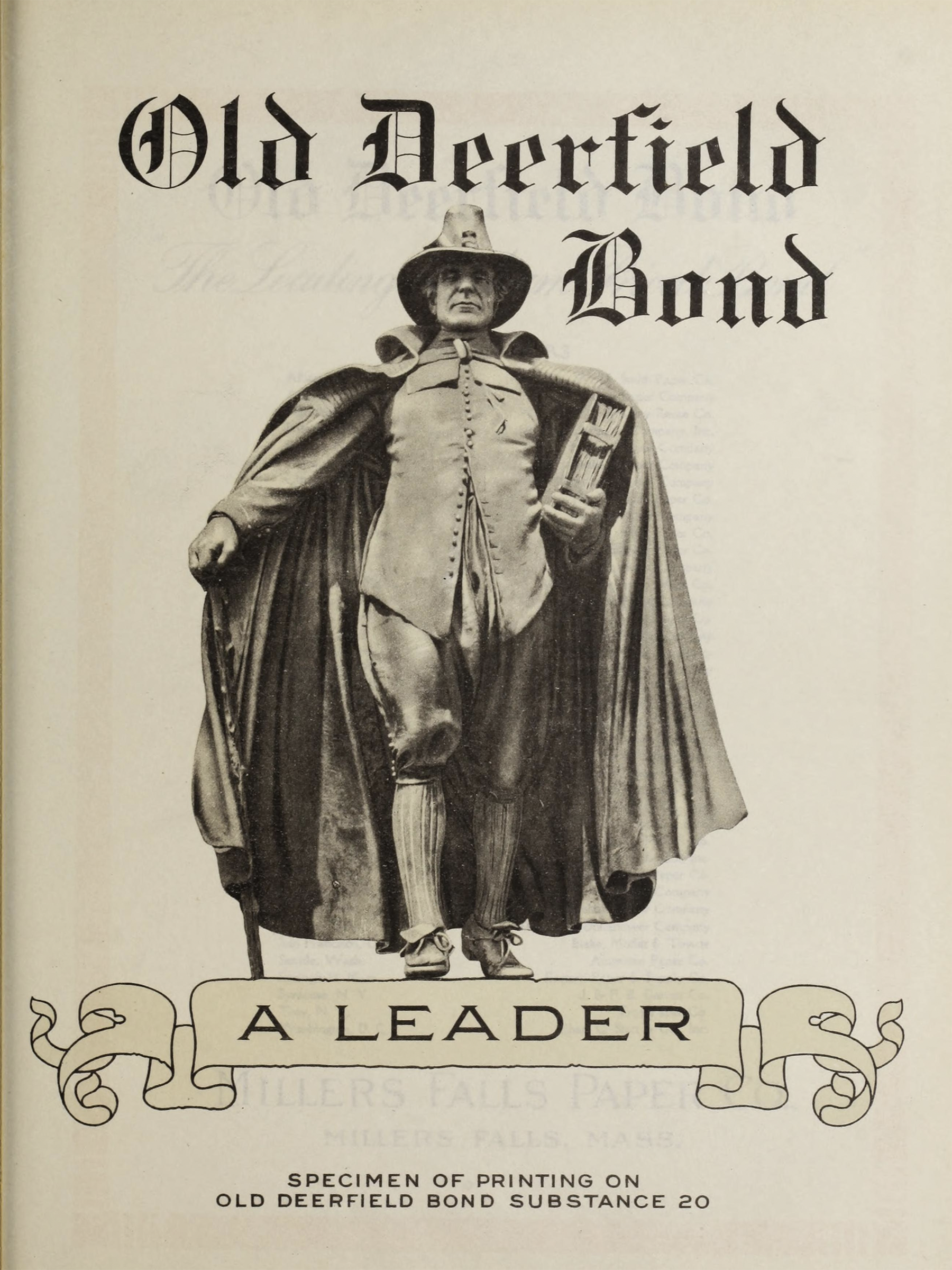
Clockwise from top to bottom, the likeness of the statue used to advertise a Boston hotel, rail service of the New York Central Railroad, a line of fine writing paper, and a stained glass rendition of the statue in The Student Prince and Fort Restaurant, in downtown Springfield.

The statue was so popular that Saint-Gaudens, seeing a business opportunity, decided to produce smaller versions under the title The Puritan. Today more than 25 slightly altered copies can be found in museums, art galleries, universities, and private collections around the world. Prominent examples appear in Boston's Museum of Fine Arts, New York City's Metropolitan Museum of Art, and the Smithsonian Museum of American Art. The statue has become a popular motif in advertising, as well as a symbol for the New England Society of New York.

The New England Society of Pennsylvanians commissioned a replica, with some changes in the figure's dress and face: "For the head in the original statue, I used as a model the head of Mr. Chapin himself, assuming that there would be some family resemblance with the Deacon, who was his direct ancestor. But Mr. Chapin's face is round and Gaelic in character, so in the Philadelphia work, I changed the features completely, giving them the long, New England type, besides altering the folds of the cloak in many respects, the legs, the left hand, and the Bible." The copy, dubbed The Pilgrim, was placed on the South Plaza of City Hall, then relocated to its present site in Fairmount Park in 1920.

Numismatist and art historian Cornelius Vermeule, in his volume on U.S. coins and medals, suggested The Puritan was one of American sculptor Cyrus E. Dallin's influences in designing the portrait of Governor William Bradford on the 1920-1921 Pilgrim Tercentenary half dollar. Like the statue, the obverse of the coin portrays a typified Puritan holding a bible under his left arm.

== Gallery ==
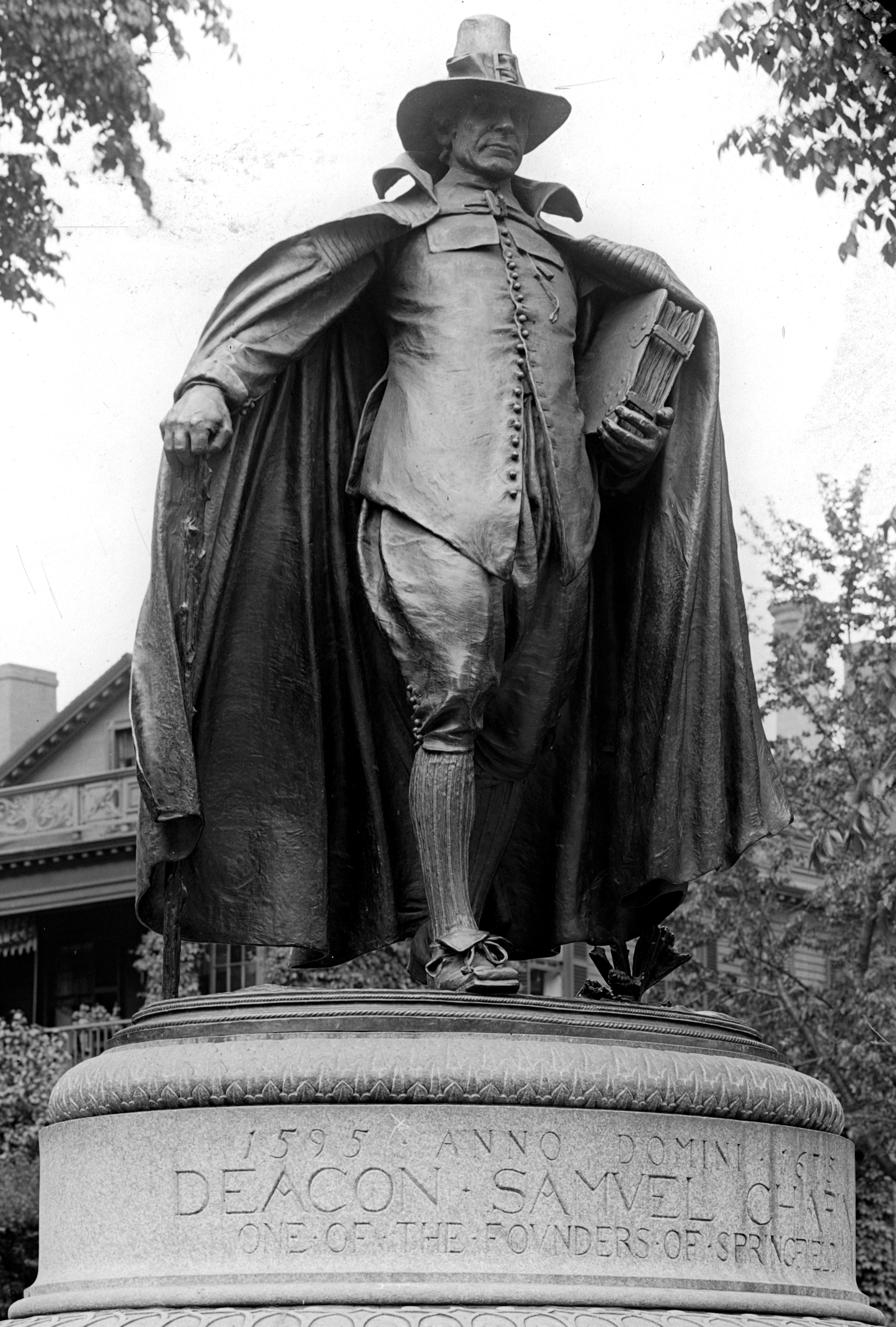
Photograph of the statue in Springfield, by the Detroit Publishing Company (1905).

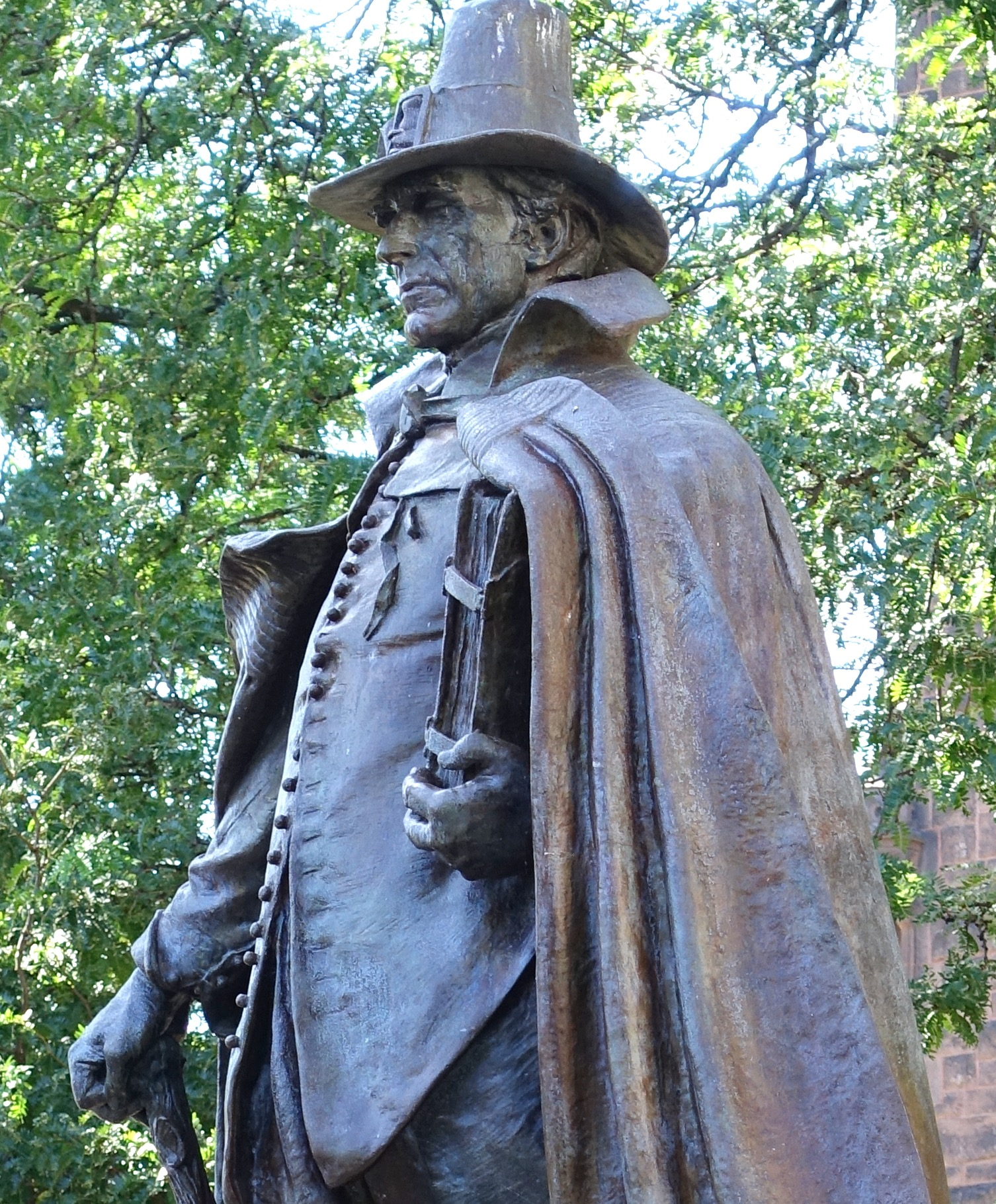
Part of The Puritan by Augustus Saint-Gaudens

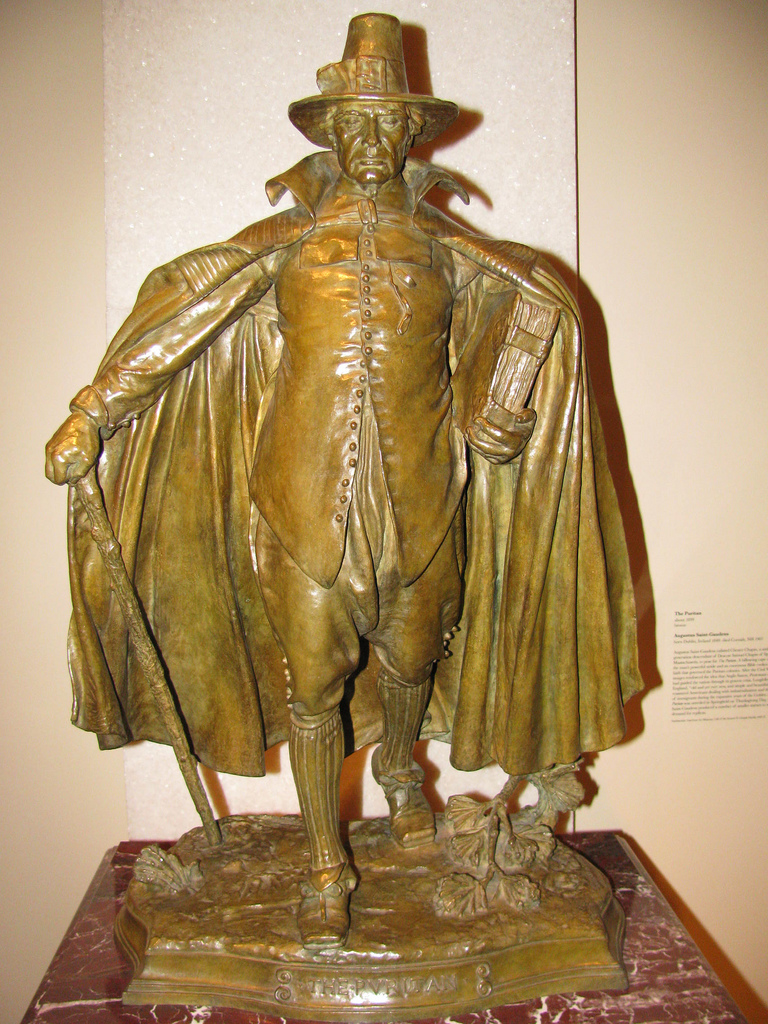
A copy of the larger sculpture by Augustus Saint-Gaudens in the Smithsonian, with differences from the Springfield original.

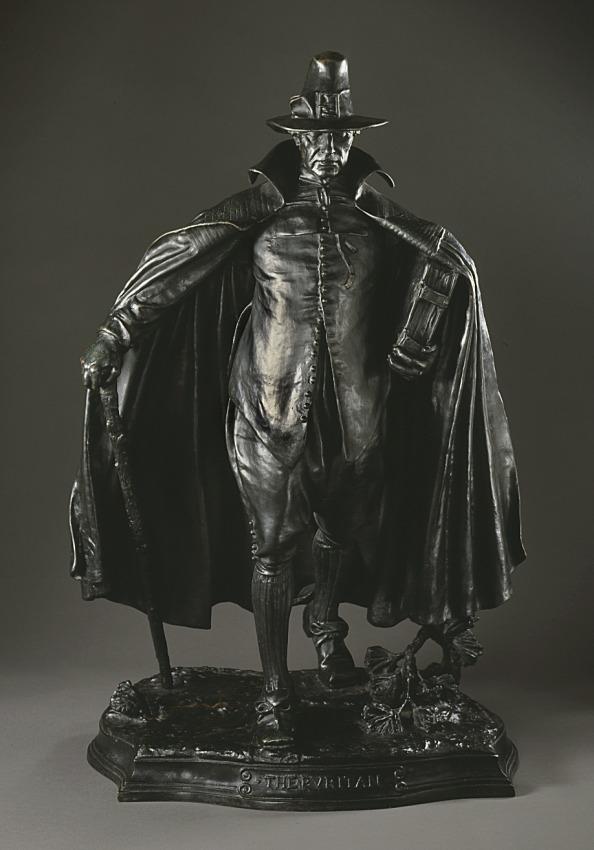
A copy of the statue in the Los Angeles County Museum of Art

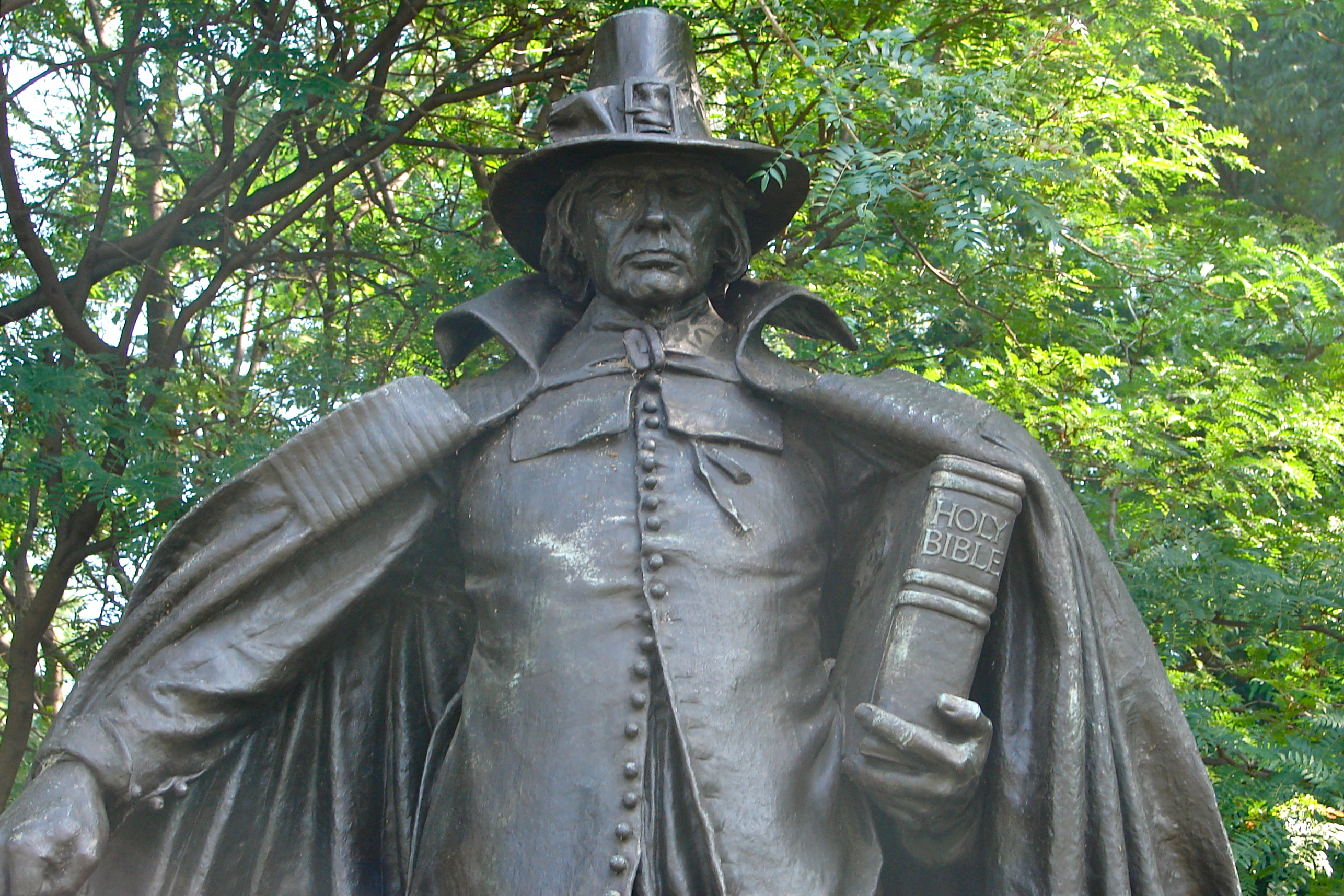
The Pilgrim, the Philadelphia replica of The Puritan.

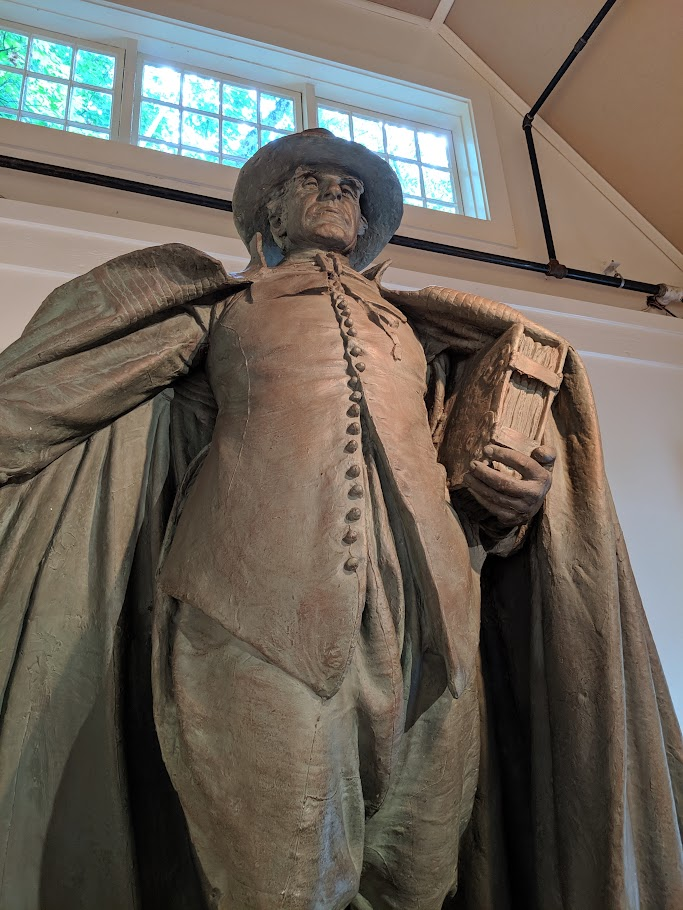
The piece's original cast at the Saint-Gaudens National Historic Park.

An illustration of one of Saint-Gaudens' copies, used to promote a so-named Chapin National Bank in 1923

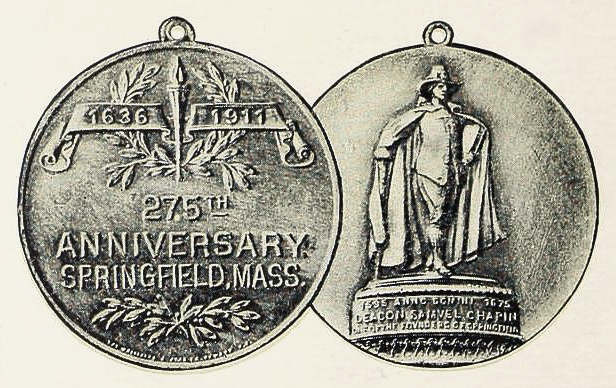
The statue on the reverse side of the city's 275th anniversary medallion

== In popular culture ==
- The statue plays a pivotal role in the plot of the 1975 mystery-drama The Reincarnation of Peter Proud, directed by J. Lee Thompson. In the film, protagonist Dr. Peter Proud, a professor in California, is haunted by visions of a town in Massachusetts from a past life, with particular focus on The Puritan statue and Springfield's South Congregational Church.
- A rendition of The Puritan is emblazoned in the center of Springfield's flag, adopted by the city in 1923.
- The statue appears in The Book of Bill in the chapter titled "Witchcraft".

== See also ==
- Robert Gould Shaw Memorial, Saint-Gaudens's most prominent piece in Boston, depicting the 54th Massachusetts, the first African-American regiment organized in the northern states during the Civil War
- Miles Morgan, a contemporary of Samuel Chapin whose likeness is depicted in a statue near the Springfield Municipal Group by Jonathan Scott Hartley
