= Pilgrim Tercentenary half dollar =

US commemorative coin

- United States
- Value: 50 cents (0.50 US dollars)
- Mass: 12.5 g
- Diameter: 30.61 mm (1.20 in)
- Thickness: 2.15 mm (0.08 in)
- Edge: Reeded
- Composition: 90.0% silver; 10.0% copper
- Silver: 0.36169 troy oz
- Years of minting: 1920–1921
- Mintage: 1920: 200,112 including 112 pieces for the Assay Commission (48,000 melted) 1921: 100,053 including 53 assay pieces (80,000 melted)
- Mint marks: None, all pieces struck at the Philadelphia Mint without mint mark

Obverse
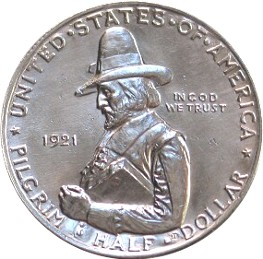
- Design: Governor William Bradford (coins struck in 1920 do not display a date on this side)
- Designer: Cyrus E. Dallin
- Design date: 1920

Reverse
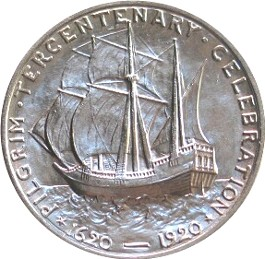
- Design: The Mayflower
- Designer: Cyrus E. Dallin
- Design date: 1920

The Pilgrim Tercentenary half dollar or Pilgrim half dollar was a commemorative fifty-cent coin struck by the United States Bureau of the Mint in 1920 and 1921 to mark the 300th anniversary (tercentenary) of the arrival of the Pilgrims in North America. It was designed by Cyrus E. Dallin.

Massachusetts Congressman Joseph Walsh was involved in joint federal and state efforts to mark the anniversary. He saw a reference to a proposed Maine Centennial half dollar and realized that a coin could be issued for the Pilgrim anniversary in support of the observances at Plymouth, Massachusetts. The bill moved quickly through the legislative process and became the Act of May 12, 1920.

Sculptor James Earle Fraser criticized some aspects of the design, but the Treasury approved it anyway. After a promising start, sales tailed off, and tens of thousands of coins from each year were returned to the Philadelphia Mint for melting. Numismatist Q. David Bowers has cited the fact that the coins were struck in the second year as the start of a trend to force collectors to buy more than one piece in order to have a complete set.

== Background ==
The Pilgrims were Brownist English Dissenters; they sought a version of the Christian religion without things they deemed nonessential, such as bishops or Christmas. They differed from the Puritans; the Pilgrims were stricter, and instead of seeking to reform the Church of England from within, sought to separate themselves from it. They had left England for the Netherlands because in 1608, King James I began to persecute Separatists. Among those who fled then was William Bradford.

Things became more difficult for the Separatists in the Netherlands in the late 1610s as the Dutch government moved towards alliance with England. They had few opportunities in the Netherlands as they were limited to manual labor by the guilds' refusal to accept them, and they feared that their children were straying from their language and religion. Investors led by Thomas Weston agreed to finance an expedition to North America, and the ship Speedwell was sent to fetch Separatists from the Netherlands, then join the larger Mayflower to form a two-ship expedition. After transporting the Separatists, the Speedwell proved unseaworthy for the ocean voyage. The Mayflower's passenger list was formed from some Separatists who had gone to the Netherlands and some who had stayed in England, as well as a scattering of others. Some would-be pioneers were left behind due to problems with the Speedwell. The Mayflower sailed from Plymouth, in South West England, on September 6, 1620, with 102 passengers and a crew of 47.

So they left that goodly and plesante citie, which had been their resting place near 12 years; but they knew they were pilgrimes and looked not much on those things, but lift up their eyes to the heavens, their dearest cuntrie, and quieted their spirits.

— William Bradford on the Pilgrims' departure from Leiden

The expedition sighted Cape Cod on November 9, 1620, and landed at what is now Provincetown, Massachusetts. Two days later, the men signed the Mayflower Compact, wherein all agreed to submit themselves to the will of the majority—one of the foundation documents of American democracy. Running short of provisions, they did not proceed to Virginia, but established a settlement at Plymouth Colony (today Plymouth, Massachusetts), although they had expected to settle further south and were ill-equipped for a Massachusetts winter. Half died before spring came. There had been few Native Americans in the area, but in 1621, the settlers were approached by a group, including two, Samoset and Squanto, who spoke some English. Squanto taught the Pilgrims indigenous methods for cultivating corn (maize), a plant native to the New World with which the emigrants were unfamiliar. This knowledge helped the Pilgrims gradually become established. The Pilgrims grew in population relatively slowly over the first generations in America, and became a minority among settlers in the area. In 1691, Plymouth Colony became part of the Province of Massachusetts Bay. Bradford's wife had died while the ship was in Provincetown Harbor; after Governor John Carver perished during the first winter, Bradford was elected in his place, and served 15 two-year terms. He guided the colony from the communal economy necessary at first, to privatization, greatly increasing the harvest in the process. His diaries were published as Of Plymouth Plantation and constitute the major source of information concerning the Pilgrims' daily lives.

In 1920, the government did not sell commemorative coins. Congress, during the early years of commemorative coinage, usually designated a specific organization allowed to buy them at face value and to vend them to the public at a premium. In the case of the Pilgrim Tercentenary half dollar, the enabling legislation did not name an organization, but it was the Pilgrim Tercentenary Commission; profits from the coin were to go towards financing the observances in honor of the 300th anniversary of the Pilgrims' arrival.

== Legislation ==
Legislation for a Pilgrim Tercentenary half dollar was introduced in the House of Representatives by Massachusetts' Joseph Walsh on March 23, 1920, with the bill designated as H.R. 13227. It was referred to the Committee on Coinage, Weights and Measures, of which Indiana Congressman Albert Vestal was the chairman. That committee held hearings on the bill on March 26, 1920, as well as on the coinage proposal that would become the Alabama Centennial half dollar, which was the first order of business. Once the committee voted to favorably recommend the Alabama bill, which provided for 100,000 half dollars, it proceeded to consider the Pilgrim proposal. Vestal had two days previously written to Treasury Secretary David F. Houston, and Houston responded that while his department had not opposed the Maine Centennial (previously approved by the committee) or Alabama coinage bills, the Treasury had concerns that issuing large numbers of different designs would aid fraudsters.

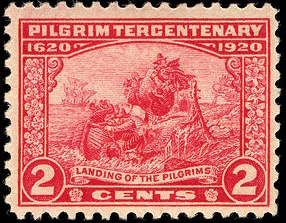
Two-cent stamp for the tercentenary, depicting the landing of the Pilgrims

Walsh appeared and explained to the committee that Congress had previously authorized a commission to work with state and local authorities in planning for observances which were to be held in December 1920 on the 300th anniversary of the Mayflower landing, and were also to occur the following summer. Although events were to be held elsewhere in Massachusetts, and even outside the state, the focus would be on Plymouth, with the beautification of the area around Plymouth Rock a major goal. The commission had recommended the issuance of commemorative stamps, and also a federal appropriation, but it was not until Walsh saw a committee report for the Maine Centennial piece listed on a House document that he came up with the idea of a commemorative coin for the anniversary. This had been done in the past for the World Columbian Exposition of 1893, Walsh recalled, and Ohio's William A. Ashbrook chimed in (incorrectly) that a coin had been issued for the Jamestown Exposition of 1907. Walsh stated that more were being asked for (500,000) than for the Alabama coin because of the great interest in the celebration; he suggested that to increase regional interest, the coins be struck at all the mints (Philadelphia, Denver, and San Francisco). Ashbrook felt the number to be issued excessive, he suggested 300,000 as more appropriate, and Walsh consented. Missouri's William L. Nelson moved that the committee approve the amended bill, and this carried. Vestal issued a report on behalf of his committee on March 26, 1920, indicating his committee's support for the bill once amended.

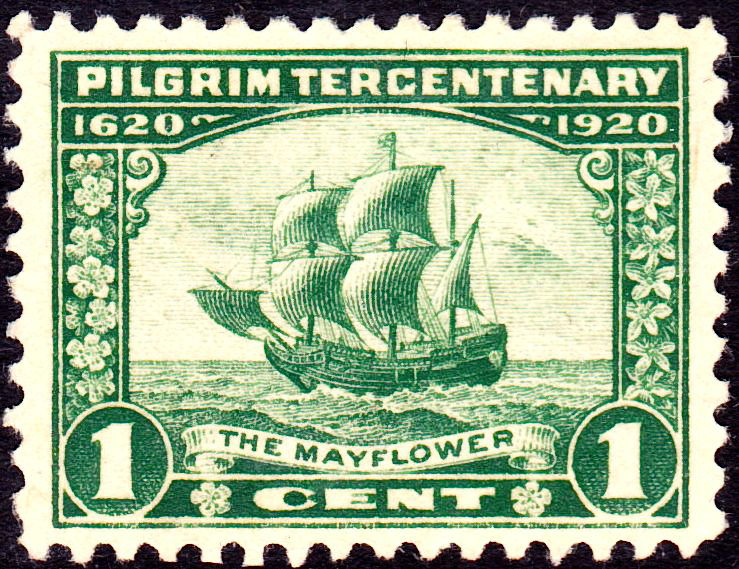
One-cent U.S. stamp for the tercentenary, depicting the Mayflower

The three coinage bills—Maine Centennial, Alabama Centennial, and Pilgrim Tercentenary—were considered in that order by the House of Representatives on April 21, 1920. As the Maine and Alabama pieces were considered, Ohio's Warren Gard asked a number of questions about various matters, including regarding the wisdom of having so many half-dollar designs issued, though he did not object to the passage of either bill. After the Pilgrim bill came to the floor, Gard asked Walsh why the bill provided for 500,000 half dollars, so much more than for the state coins; Walsh responded that it was because the coin was for a 300th anniversary rather than just a 100th. Gard followed up this point, asking if it had been a 400th anniversary, whether even more coins would be justified, and Walsh agreed. Both Walsh and Vestal were asked by Gard how many half dollars were in circulation, but neither legislator knew. Washington Representative John Franklin Miller asked whether the coin was to commemorate the original landing of the Pilgrims at Provincetown or their subsequent landing at Plymouth, but Walsh did not answer the question definitively. Congressman James W. Dunbar of Indiana noted that the price of silver had risen so high that the Mint might be out of pocket in striking the coins, and asked if the federal government would cover any losses; Vestal responded that Massachusetts would. Vestal then moved the committee amendment to reduce the authorized mintage from 500,000 to 300,000, attracting the attention of Gard, who asked the reason for the change and was told the original bill had a typographical error. Walsh had told the committee that he had selected the figure of 500,000 since the Pilgrim anniversary was more important than the Maine state centennial. Gard inquired if the amendment had been approved by the committee, and when he was told it had, asked if the Pilgrim half dollars would buy more than ordinary half dollars to which Walsh replied, "why, I think very likely, especially on Cape Cod." Gard indicated his hope that he could spend a few days there that summer, and Vestal stated that Gard would be welcome to obtain and spend half dollars in any of the three states celebrating anniversaries. The bill passed the House without recorded opposition.

The following day, April 22, the House reported its passage of the bill to the Senate. The bill was referred to the Senate Committee on Banking and Currency; on April 28, Connecticut's George P. McLean reported it back with a recommendation it pass. On May 3, McLean asked that the three coin bills (Maine, Alabama and Pilgrim) be considered by the Senate immediately, rather than awaiting their turns, but Utah Senator Reed Smoot objected: Smoot's attempt to bring up an anti-dumping trade bill had just been objected to by Charles S. Thomas of Colorado. Smoot, however, stated if the bills had not been considered by about 2:00 pm, there would probably not be any objection. When McLean tried again to advance the coin bills, Kansas Senator Charles Curtis asked if there was any urgency. McLean replied that as the three coin bills were to mark ongoing anniversaries, there was a need to have them authorized and get the production process started. All three bills passed the Senate without opposition and the Pilgrim bill was enacted with the signature of President Woodrow Wilson on May 12, 1920.

== Preparation ==
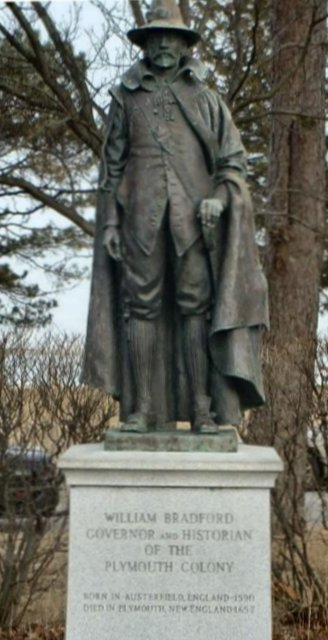
Governor William Bradford (1920) by Cyrus E. Dallin, who also designed the coin

The Pilgrim Tercentenary Commission made sketches for a design, which were converted to three-dimensional plaster models by Cyrus E. Dallin, a Boston sculptor known for his portrayals of Native Americans and works related to the Pilgrims. As the legislation was not approved until May 12, 1920, and the commission hoped to have the coins available for sale as early as possible, Dallin was urged to hurry with his work. The selection of Dallin apparently delighted Commission of Fine Arts (CFA) chairman Charles Moore, who wrote to the sculptor in convivial terms.

Dallin finished his models in August 1920 and the CFA referred the designs to sculptor member James Earle Fraser. On examining Dallin's work, Fraser deemed the lettering crude, and in an undated letter to Moore (probably late August) regretted that there was no opportunity to make changes. He suggested that the Mint be urged to allow three months in future for CFA consideration. After the commission met on September 3, a letter to that effect was sent to the Director of the United States Mint, Raymond T. Baker. The letter was ignored, but the Treasury approved the designs.

== Design ==
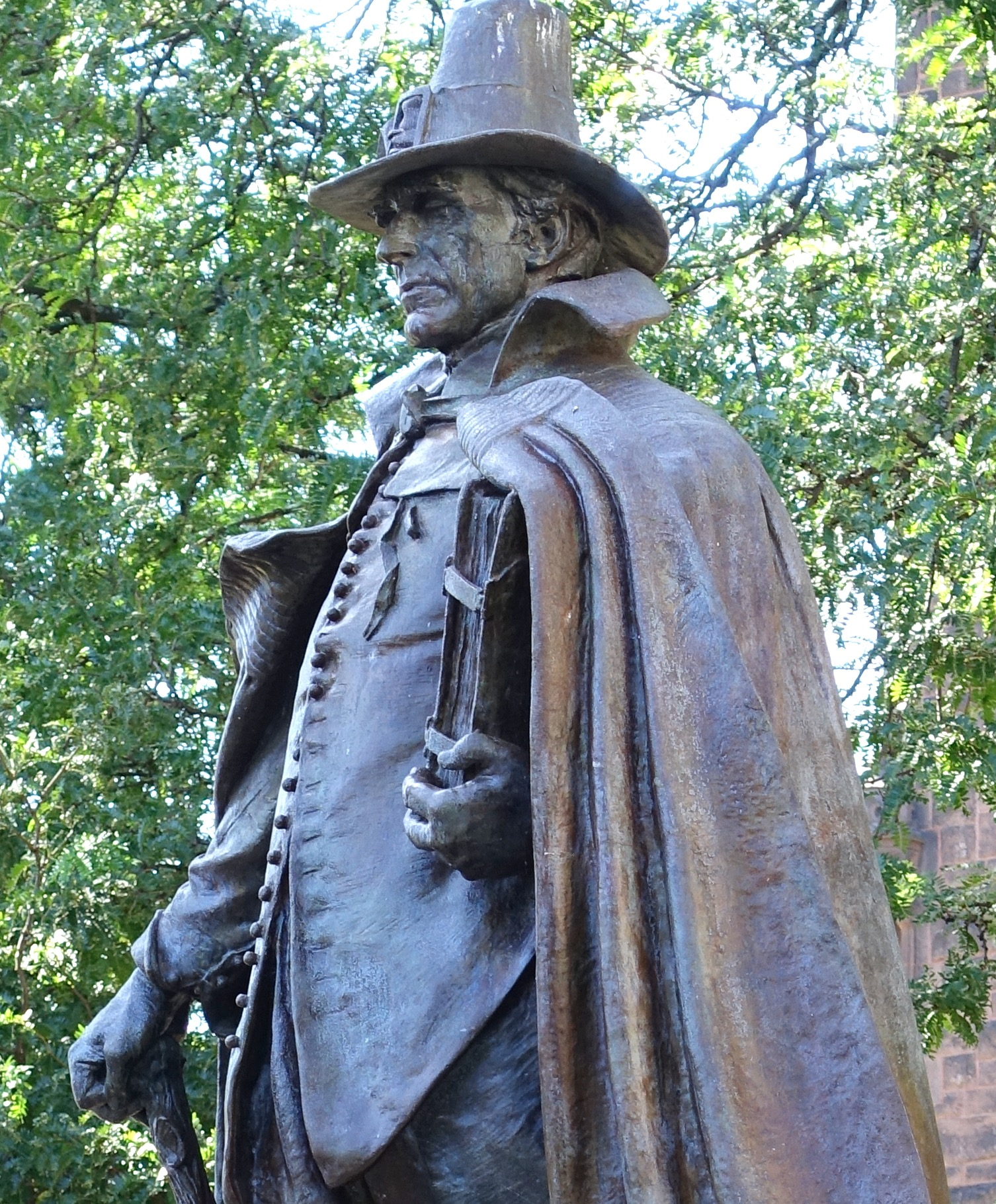
Part of The Puritan by Augustus Saint-Gaudens

The obverse of the coin features William Bradford. He wears a hat and carries a Bible under his arm. Bradford, noted for piety, is intended to be seen in a moment of meditation. Dallin's plaster models had the words "HOLY BIBLE" on the volume; these, together with Dallin's initials "CED", were removed. Instead, the initial D was placed under Bradford's elbow, likely impressed upon the hub as an afterthought by a punch normally used to create the mint mark D for the Denver Mint. Numismatists Anthony Swiatek and Walter Breen deemed Bradford's broad collar near enough to Puritan wear of the day to pass, though they questioned the authenticity of the ruffled cravat. Bradford's portrait is in any case an invention; no genuine likeness of him is known. The crudeness of the lettering complained of by Fraser is not apparent due to the relatively small size of the coins.

The reverse depicts the Mayflower under full sail. Numismatic writers have focused much attention on the fact that the ship bears a triangular flying jib, a type of sail not used at the time of the Mayflower voyage. This error was avoided by Clair Aubrey Huston in his design for the one-cent stamp issued on December 21, 1920. The inscriptions and dates that encircle the coin are self-explanatory. The reverse of the 2026 Mayflower Compact quarter dollar, issued in recognition of the United States Semiquincentennial, is based on this design.

Art historian Cornelius Vermeule, in his volume on U.S. coins and medals, deemed the Pilgrim half dollar "a masterpiece in the conservative tradition". He suggested that Dallin's portrait of Bradford was influenced by Augustus Saint-Gaudens and his sculpture, The Puritan. Vermeule deemed the ship on the reverse a great advance on George T. Morgan's 1892 depiction of the Santa María on the Columbian half dollar, and felt that Dallin's vessel presaged the ships (at least five) on commemorative coins of the 1930s. "Seen from the stern on the waves, the Pilgrims' ship is impressive."

== Production, distribution, and collecting ==
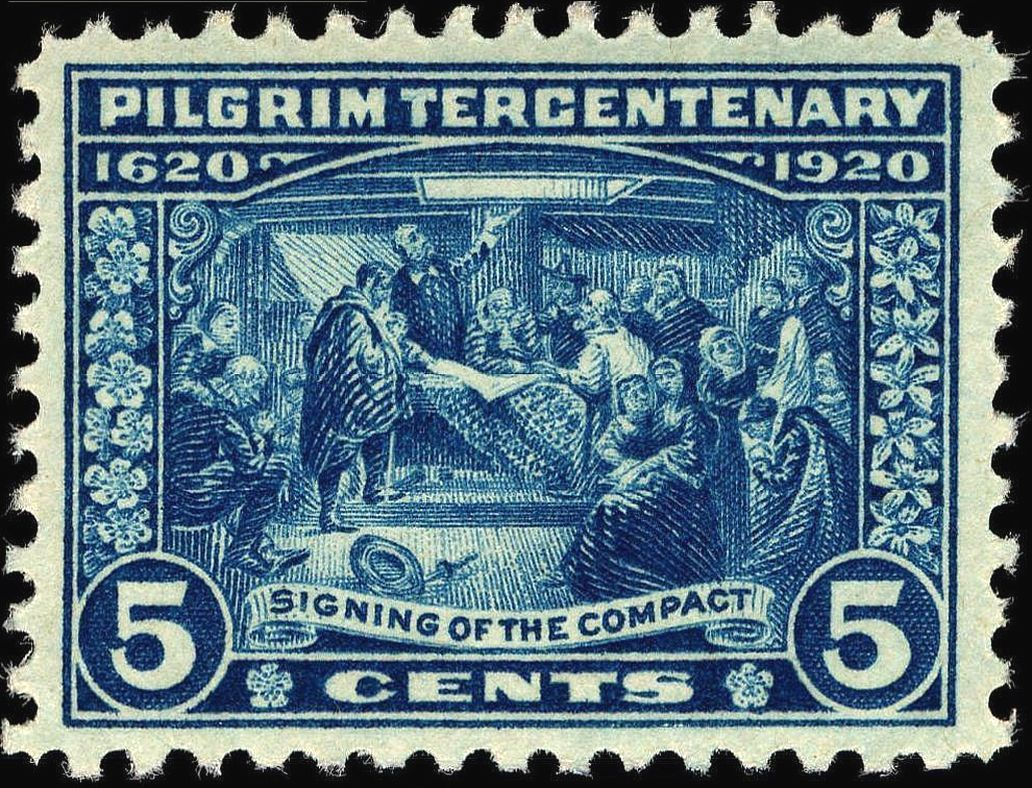
Five-cent stamp for the tercentenary, depicting the signing of the Mayflower Compact

The Philadelphia Mint coined 200,112 half dollars in October 1920, with the excess above the round number reserved for inspection and testing at the 1921 meeting of the annual Assay Commission. They were shipped to the National Shawmut Bank of Boston which sold the coins for $1 each to the public, with the profits to go to the tercentenary commission. The coins could be ordered through any bank in Boston or Plymouth. Swiatek believed the sale of 1920-dated coins to have been very successful, and there was no thought at that time of returning any to the Mint for redemption and melting. The first order had not exhausted the authorized mintage, so the tercentenary commission ordered 100,000 more during the spring of 1921 when sales slowed. These were coined in July, together with 53 pieces held for the 1922 Assay Commission, and they have the year of issue added on the obverse to the left of Bradford. This was done to comply with the Coinage Act of 1873, which required the year of striking to appear on coins. The recession of 1921 began soon after; sales dropped, and tens of thousands of both dates remained unsold. The tercentenary commission returned 48,000 of the 1920 issue and 80,000 of the 1921 to the Mint.

Both dates of the Pilgrim half dollar have appreciated in price over the years, particularly the 1921 issue, of which only 20,000 are extant. At the peak of the first commemorative coin boom in 1936, the 1920 sold for $1.75 and the 1921 for $8; at the peak of the second boom in 1980, the 1920 sold for $275 and the 1921 for $800. The deluxe edition of R. S. Yeoman's A Guide Book of United States Coins (2015) lists the 1920 at between $85 and $650 and the 1921 at between $170 and $850, each depending on condition. An exceptional specimen of the 1920 sold at auction in 2014 for $7,344.

Coin dealer and numismatic author Q. David Bowers deemed the Pilgrim coin to be the first time that a commemorative half dollar had been struck over multiple years for the purpose of making numismatists buy multiple coins to keep their collections complete:

Up until this time relatively little attention had been paid to promoting commemorative coins to collectors. The numismatic fraternity accounted for only a small percentage of the total sales ... The 1921-dated Pilgrim halves were created to "get" the collector, as [coin dealer] B. Max Mehl put it, to pander to the desire of numismatists to achieve complete sets. The handwriting was on the wall, and in the same year it soon became every collector for himself against the greed of the issuers of the 1921 Alabama and Missouri halves. The age of innocence had ended.
