= Chester W. Chapin =

American politician, railroad executive (1798–1883)

Chester William Chapin
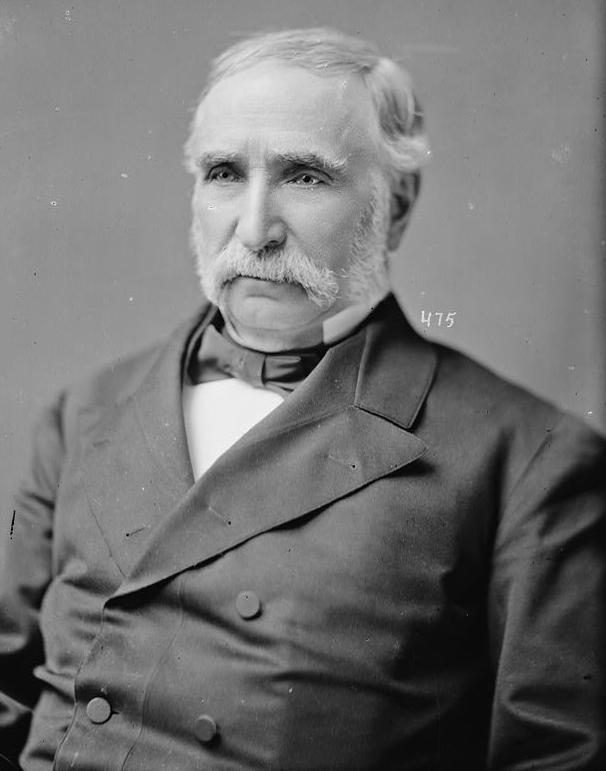

Member of the U.S. House of Representatives from Massachusetts's 11th district
- In office March 4, 1875 – March 3, 1877
- Preceded by: Henry L. Dawes
- Succeeded by: George D. Robinson

Personal details
- Born: December 16, 1798 Ludlow, Massachusetts
- Died: June 10, 1883 (aged 84) Springfield, Massachusetts
- Party: Democratic
- Occupation: Businessman

Chester William Chapin (December 16, 1798 – June 10, 1883) was an American businessman, president of the Boston and Albany Railroad from 1868 to 1878, and U.S. Congressman from Massachusetts. He was a multimillionaire at his death in 1883, and controlled one of New England’s most important rail lines.

== Early days ==
Chester W. Chapin was born in Ludlow, Massachusetts, to Ephriam and Mary Smith Chapin, the youngest of seven children, and six generations removed from Puritan forebearer, Deacon Samuel Chapin.

The family moved to Chicopee and in 1806 his father died, leaving Chester and his brothers to work their farm. He attended common schools and Westfield Academy, Westfield, Massachusetts. One of his first paying jobs was when local cotton mills were being built, when he earned $1.50 a day.

== Career ==
Chapin quickly went into business for himself, opening a store, and in 1822 was appointed town tax collector, for which he received $80.

Around 1826 he bought an interest in the stage line from Hartford, Connecticut, to Brattleboro, Vermont, and soon held extensive mail and stage contracts. In 1831, when steamboats began to run on the river between Hartford and Springfield, Massachusetts, he bought an interest, soon became sole proprietor, and for about 15 years controlled all the passenger traffic on that route.

He also became a large or principal owner of the steamship lines between New York City, Hartford, and New Haven, Connecticut. He later extended his interests into railroads and banking, becoming founder, principal, or president of many companies, including the Western Railroad, the Agawam (National) Bank, and the Connecticut River Railroad. He was one of the earliest advocates of a bridge over the Hudson River at Albany, New York. He served as president and a director of the Western Railroad Corporation from 1854 to 1867, president of the Boston and Albany Railroad from 1868 to 1878, and a director until 1880.

=== As Congressman ===
Before his time in Congress, Chapin served as a delegate of the Massachusetts Constitutional Convention of 1853 and, as a War Democrat, purchased the uniforms of the 10th Regiment Massachusetts Volunteer Infantry at the outset of the American Civil War. Chapin was elected as a Democrat to the Forty-fourth Congress (March 4, 1875 – March 3, 1877), and served on the Committee of Ways And Means. He ran unsuccessfully for reelection in 1876.

== Personal life ==
Chapin married his first cousin Dorcas [Chapin] on June 1, 1825; they had four children: Abel Dexter, Margaret, Anna, and Chester W.

He died a multimillionaire in Springfield on June 10, 1883, and was interred in Springfield Cemetery. His son Chester (Abel died in 1878) inherited his estate, despite being himself already a millionaire, and he acquired various homes including a 20,000 acres estate in the Catskills Mountains in New York State, about 100 miles from Manhattan. He died in 1922, leaving an estate of about 5 million dollars.

=== Family ===
Chapin’s great-uncles, Harvey Dexter Chapin and Abijah White Chapin, married Louisa D. Wilcox and Sarah M. Wilcox, cousins of manufacturer Burrage Yale, and members of the Yale family. Lucy's husband, Eli Wilcox, was Justice of the Peace and Board director the State bank of Connecticut, and her brother, Dr. Leroy Milton Yale Sr. was a Harvard graduate, fishing ships owner, and father of Dr. Leroy Milton Yale Jr. Chester was also the great-granduncle of Sarah Yale Chapin, daughter of Abijah W., and granddaughter of Col. Harvey.

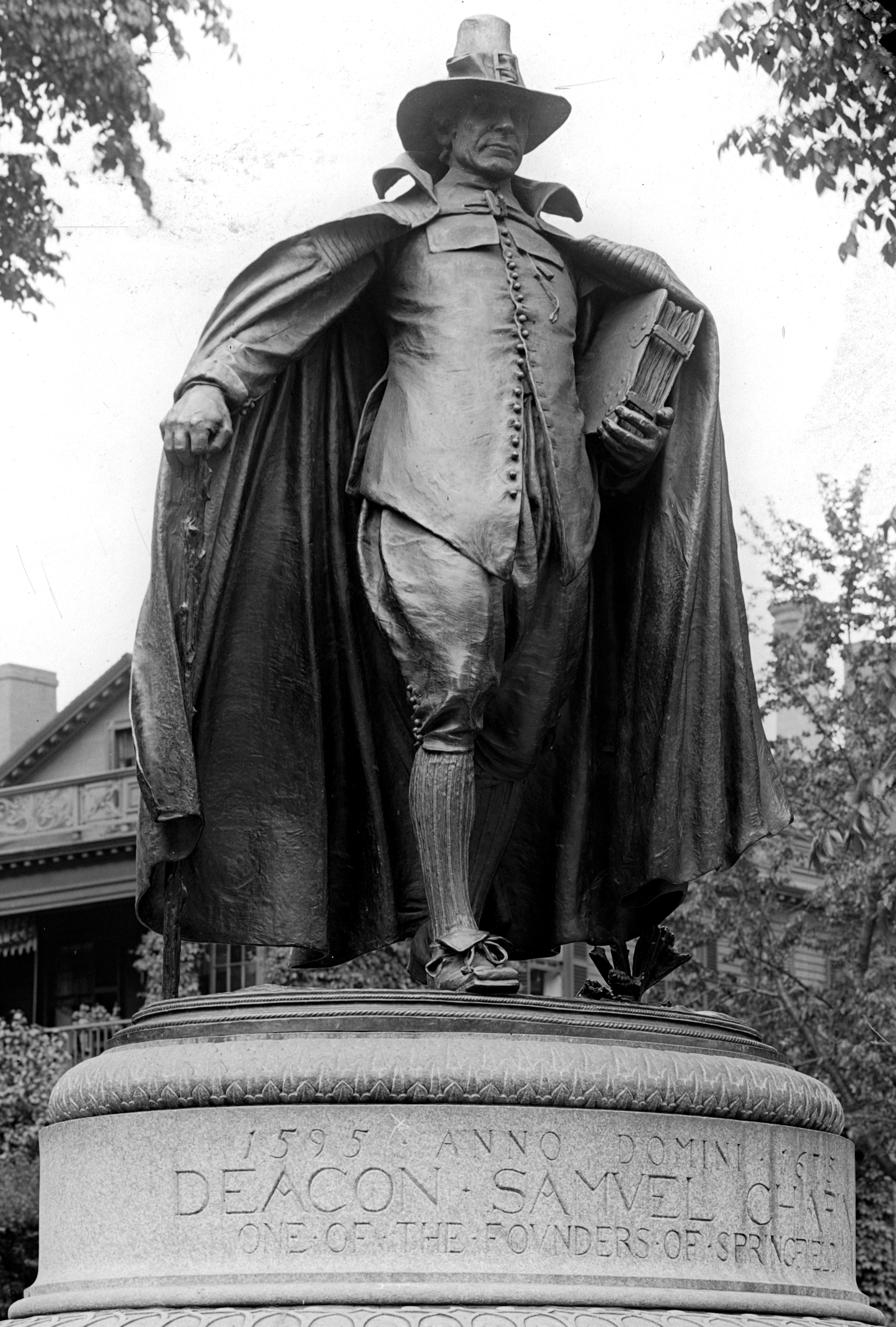
The Statue of Deacon Samuel Chapin, known as The Puritan, in Springfield, Massachusetts.

In 1881, Chapin commissioned sculptor Augustus Saint-Gaudens to produce a sculpture of his forefather, Deacon Samuel Chapin; the end result, The Puritan, was not released until 1887, four years after Chester Chapin's death.

== Legacy ==
The New York, New Haven & Hartford Railroad Company / New England Steamship company (Providence Line) passenger steamer Chester W. Chapin of 1899 (served until 1923) was named after him.

== See also ==
- Yampa
- List of railroad executives

== Footnotes ==
U.S. House of Representatives
Preceded by Henry L. Dawes	Member of the U.S. House of Representatives from Massachusetts district 11; March 4, 1875 – March 3, 1877	Succeeded by George D. Robinson
