= Club Quarter =

District in Springfield, Massachusetts, US

Coordinates: 42°6′15.3″N 72°35′32.2″W

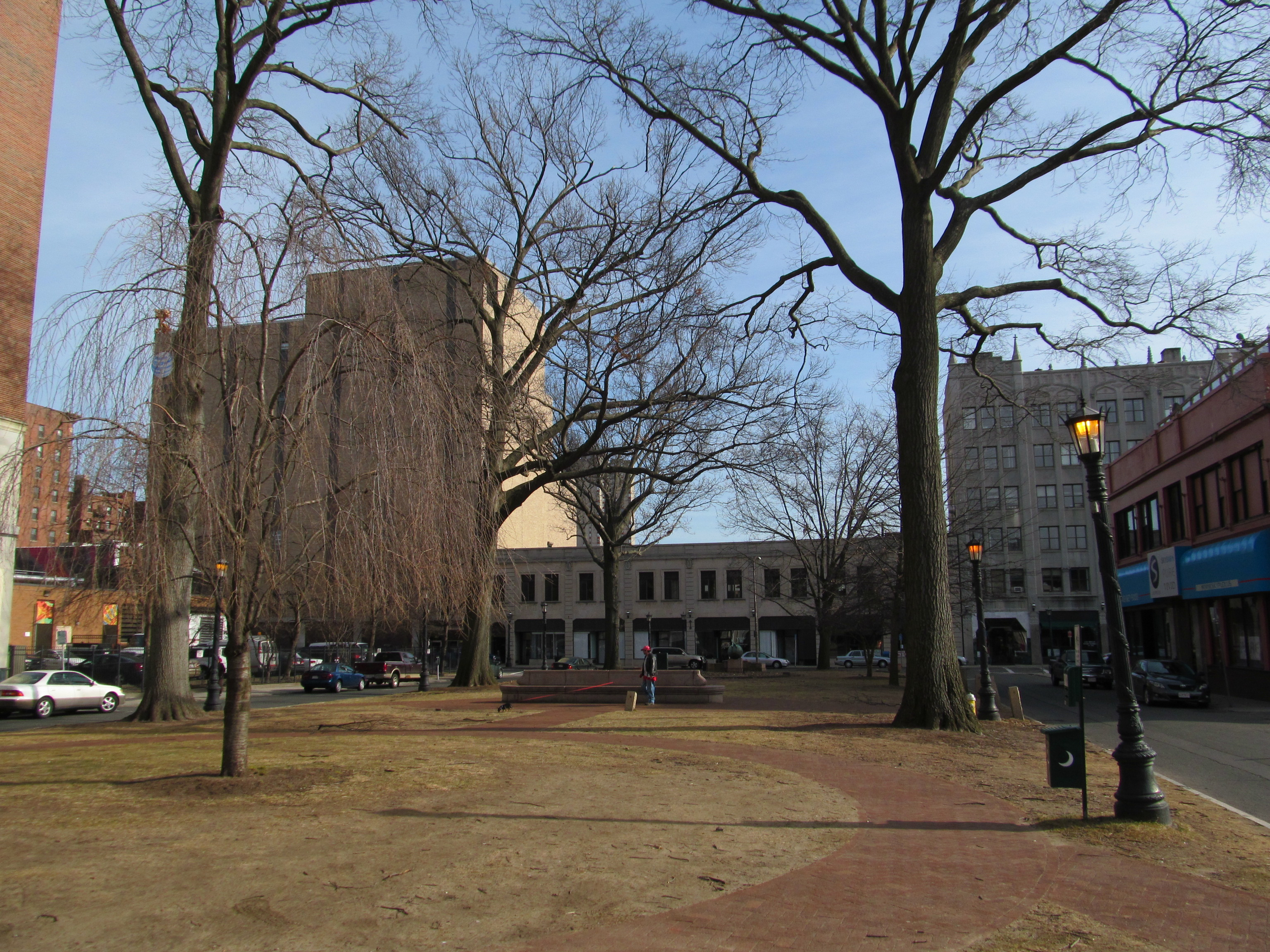
Stearns Square in 2012

The Entertainment District is located in Springfield, Massachusetts, in the Metro Center district surrounding historic Stearns Square. Stearns Square is bordered by Worthington Street to the north and Bridge Street to the south; however, the Entertainment District extends for several city blocks north, south, east and west of Stearns Square. For over 100 years, this area of Springfield, surrounding Stearns Square and Springfield Union Station have been home to the city's most prominent clubs, restaurants, bars, music venues, movies houses, and coffee houses. Currently, there are over 75 restaurants, nightclubs, and bars in Springfield's Entertainment District, making it the largest entertainment district between New York City and Montreal, Canada. The Entertainment District is a primary reason why Springfield was recently ranked among America's Top Ten Best Cities for Singles by Yahoo and Sperling's Best Places.

== Venues surrounding Stearns Square ==
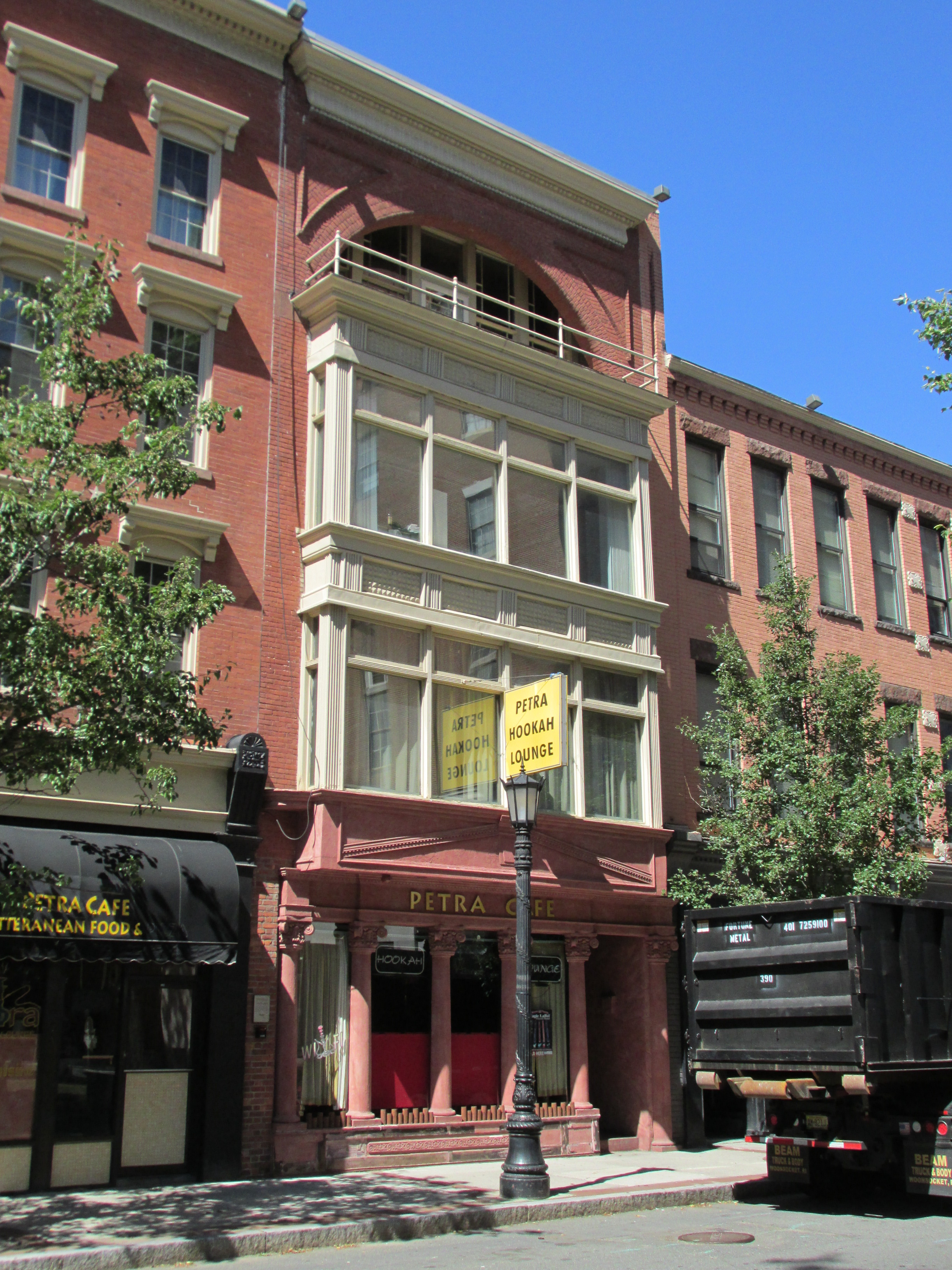
Petra Hookah Lounge

One constant in Springfield's Entertainment District since 1902 has been Smith's Billiards, which has long hosted professional pool matches, as well as a mix of young and old virtually every-night. Another constant is Theodore's Blues Club - it has been in operation for nearly 30 years and has, on several occasions, been named the best blues club in the United States. The Mardi Gras is yet another Springfield institution - it is the largest and most elaborate gentleman's club north of New York City and south of Montreal, (including Boston.) With over 300 "Gras girls" on monthly rotation and its own magazine, the Mardi Gras is not one's average strip club.

The Shadow Lounge attracts a younger crowd with a "swanky" atmosphere. Shakago's is a martini, jazz, and piano bar on Hampden Street. Alumni is geared toward the college and post-graduate scene, with live rock music and DJs; however, one can also play games like Keno there. Fat Cat Bar & Grille is a dive bar that attracts a younger crowd and usually plays punk and industrial music.

Glo Ultra Lounge is a popular club on Saturday nights, with a swanky atmosphere and light show. Petra, next door to Glo, is Springfield's only hookah bar. The Pub Lounge was, until very recently an LGBT bar; however, now it has shifted its focus to a sports bar. Adolfo's is an Italian restaurant serving fine cuisine made from fresh, local ingredients - with an outdoor bar that features a DJ and dancing.

== Growing LGBT nightlife ==
Springfield's LGBT nightlife has grown exponentially since the Massachusetts Supreme Court legalized gay marriage in 2004. In 2011, the City of Springfield celebrated its first gay pride week, with rainbow flags adorning nearly every flag post in Metro Center, Springfield, Massachusetts and in 2010, The Advocate named Springfield one of its Top 15 gay cities. According to the 2010 Census, Springfield, more than any other major Massachusetts city, has been greatly impacted by the recent influx of LGBT residents. Boston, Cambridge, Northampton, and Provincetown were long-considered gay-friendly destinations before the Massachusetts Supreme Court ruling; however, Springfield was not. At the time when gay marriage was legalized in Massachusetts, Springfield featured low real-estate prices, a housing and condominium stock full of extraordinary architecture, and an (at that time just) budding bohemian arts and entertainment scene. This combination attracted many LGBT residents who stayed in Springfield and have made its gay nightlife one of the most worthwhile between New York and Montreal. Currently, Springfield features five full-time gay bars and clubs, and numerous other bars and clubs hosting gay nights. As of 2011, Springfield is widely considered a highly "gay friendly city," with two openly gay city councilman. Recently, the New England gay publication The Rainbow Times declared Springfield, "suddenly gay."

== The Paramount Theater also known as The Hippodrome ==
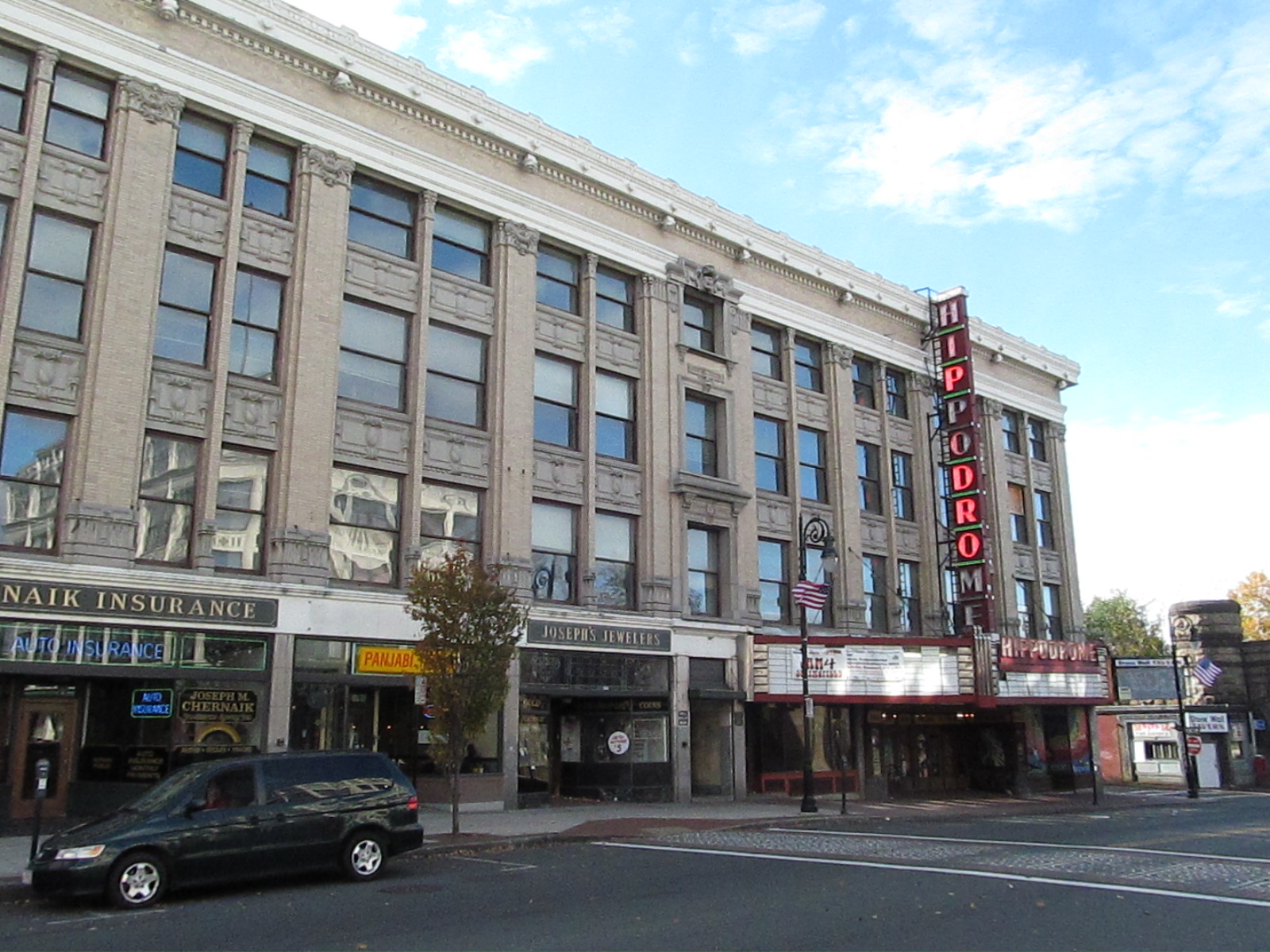
The Hippodrome in 2012

Since 1926, an entertainment venue has occupied the site of The Paramount Theater, (most recently known as The Hippodrome,) at 1700 Main Street next to Springfield's famous Gothic railway arch. Built at a cost of over $1 million in 1926 dollars, The Paramount Theater was the most ornate movie palace in Western New England during its glory days from the 1920s-1960s. It remained a movie theater until the 1960s when it began to find use as a mixed center for movies, concerts, and live performances, (including especially memorable performances by the Velvet Underground, Eric Burdon and the Animals, and Alice Cooper.) The theater was also once run by Western Massachusetts Theatres which at one time owned almost all of the single screen palaces in the area including The Rivoli and The Bing in Springfield, and The Calvin in Northampton.

It was not until 1999 that the theater found a stable operator again. It was purchased, underwent a $1.3 million make-over, and converted into a lavish night club and performance space, known as The Hippodrome. The main floors seats were removed, but the 1,100 balcony seats were retained and restored. The original organ was restored and the marquee was changed to reflect the "Hippodrome" name. During its time as the Hippodrome, the venue became one of the Northeast's centers of the "rave scene," drawing thousands every few months with elaborate raves. When that scene eventually died down, The Hippodrome became more of a hip-hop/novelty club, featuring performers like RuPaul. In 2010, the Hippodrome was purchased by the New England Farm Workers' Council and renamed The Paramount Theater. Currently, the Paramount is in the midst of a $1.725 million renovation.
