= Siege of Springfield =

1675 Siege during King Philip's War

- Part of King Phillip's War
Location	Springfield, Massachusetts Bay 42.104°N 72.594°W
Result	Springfield sacked and razed

Belligerents
Massachusetts Bay	Agawam

Commanders and leaders
Miles Morgan; Samuel Appleton	–

Strength
Unknown	Unknown

The siege of Springfield was a siege of the colonial New England settlement of Springfield in 1675 by Native Americans during King Philip's War. Springfield was the second colonial settlement in New England to be burned to the ground during the war, following Providence Plantations. King Philip's War remains, per capita, the bloodiest war in American history.

== Background ==
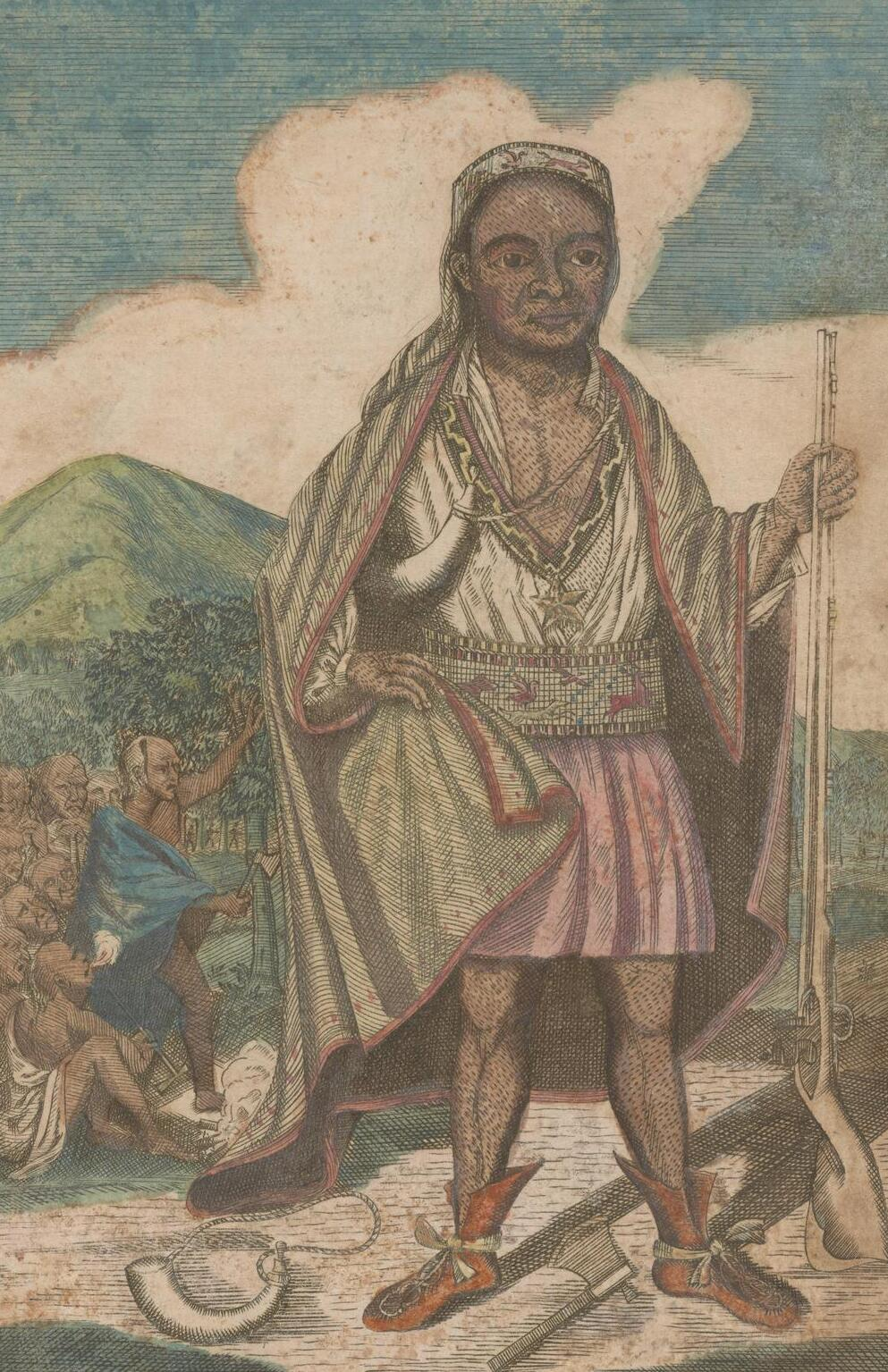
Portrait of King Philip by Paul Revere

English colonists from Massachusetts Bay Colony established a settlement on the Connecticut River in 1636. They maintained a complex relationship with local Indian tribes. The fur trade stood at the heart of their economic interactions, a lucrative business that guided many other policy decisions. The colonists traded wampum, cloth, and metal in exchange for furs. The tribes sometimes used land as collateral in exchange for colonial goods on the future promise of beavers. However, trade with the colonists made pelts so lucrative that the beaver was rapidly overhunted. The volume of the trade fell from a 1654 high of 3,723 pelts to a mere 191 a decade later, which resulted in the tribes forcibly ceding land which they had put up for security.

Springfield colonist Samuel Marshfield acquired land from the Indian inhabitants of Agawam so rapidly that they soon had "little left to plant on", to the point where the Massachusetts General Court stepped in and forced Marshfield to allocate them 15 acres. Some tribes began to construct and gather in palisaded forts; the Agawam fort outside of Springfield was on Long Hill, although it is commonly believed that it stood in a modern-day park called "King Philip’s Stockade". In 1675, Eastern Massachusetts Wampanoag Indian sachem Metacomet (known as "King Philip" to the colonists) led the Wampanoag and allied peoples against the New England Colonies after the death of his brother Wamsutta, and the conflict rapidly spread through New England.

== The siege ==
=== Siege ===
As the conflict grew in its initial months, the leaders of Springfield were deeply concerned with maintaining peaceful relations with the tribes around them. The Agawams cooperated, even providing valuable intelligence to the colonists. In August 1675, colonial soldiers in Hadley demanded a fort of Nonotuck Indians be disarmed, but they were unwilling to relinquish their weapons and left in the night of August 25. A hundred soldiers pursued them, catching up to them at the foot of Sugarloaf Hill. The colonists attacked, but the Nonotucks forced them to withdraw and were able to keep moving. Lisa Brooks writes that this "invok[ed] the narrative of the Great Beaver," an ancient story of a giant beaver who was killed to protect the balance of life in the region and whose body became Sugarloaf itself, "provoking a wide network of relations in Kwinitekw Valley and beyond."

Colonial leaders knew that Springfield could be endangered by the attack on the Nonotucks. Authorities from Connecticut advised village leader John Pynchon “against disarming… but rather … to take hostages for the security of the fidelity of their Indians." Pynchon agreed, sending Agawam hostages to be kept in Hartford. This threat, however, was not enough to prevent the Agawams from rising up against the colonists. While John Pynchon and his soldiers were fighting their kin in Hadley, hundreds of Indian tribesmen prepared to attack Springfield and escape from the area. In advance of the attack, they sent a small group to rescue the hostages in Hartford. They likely passed through Windsor, Connecticut, where an Indian named Toto - a laborer for the wealthy Wolcott family - may have learned about the impending action against Springfield. Accounts differ as to what happened next - whether Toto was coerced or volunteered the information himself - but Toto informed the colonists of the impending attack.

=== Sack ===
Despite the advance warning, the Agawam burned 45 of Springfield's 60 houses to the ground, as well as its grist and saw mills, which belonged to John Pynchon. Much of the town became smoldering ruins, and the colonists considered abandoning it entirely. The residents of Springfield endured the winter of 1675 under siege conditions. John Pynchon's brick house served as a refuge for many residents during the siege, while Pynchon himself was away leading troops at Hadley. Springfield's Captain Miles Morgan and his sons became known in the village for having defended their settlement, as well. Their blockhouse was another shelter during the attack and was one of a handful of homesteads to survive the siege.

The Indians burned colonial mills throughout New England during King Philip's War, which affected the colonists' food supplies in some areas. After the loss of their mill, the people of Springfield were forced to walk to Westfield for grain, and Indians attacked them in transit.

== Aftermath and legacy ==
John Pynchon and his troops arrived only after the Springfield was burnt, with the incident possibly being the reason behind his replacement as chief commander by Samuel Appleton. An indigenous woman was taken captive at Springfield. After telling the colonists of Metacomet's future targets and winter quarters, she was torn to pieces by dogs.

During King Philip's War, more than 800 settlers were killed and approximately 8,000 Indians were killed, enslaved, or made refugees. Some histories mark the end of the war with the death of Metacom in the summer of 1676, although the conflict extended into Maine, where the Wabanaki Confederacy fought the colonists to a standstill and a truce.

Following the war, the greater part of the Indian population left Western Massachusetts behind, although land deeds between Indian tribes and settlers continued into the 1680s. Many refugees of the war joined the Wabanaki Confederacy in the north, where their descendants remain today. Indian warriors returned to Western Massachusetts alongside the French during the Seven Years' War, and Abenaki descendants visiting Deerfield are recorded in the 1830s and beyond.

The Student Prince and The Fort Restaurant in Springfield has a plaque by its entrance to commemorate the site of Pynchon's brick house, which was known as the "fort house". Bronze statues have been erected for Miles Morgan and Toto commemorating them for their roles in defending the settlement from the siege. The Miles Morgan statue stands in front of City Hall, the Toto statue in King Philip's Stockade of Forest Park, Springfield.
