= Miles Morgan =

Welsh colonist of America

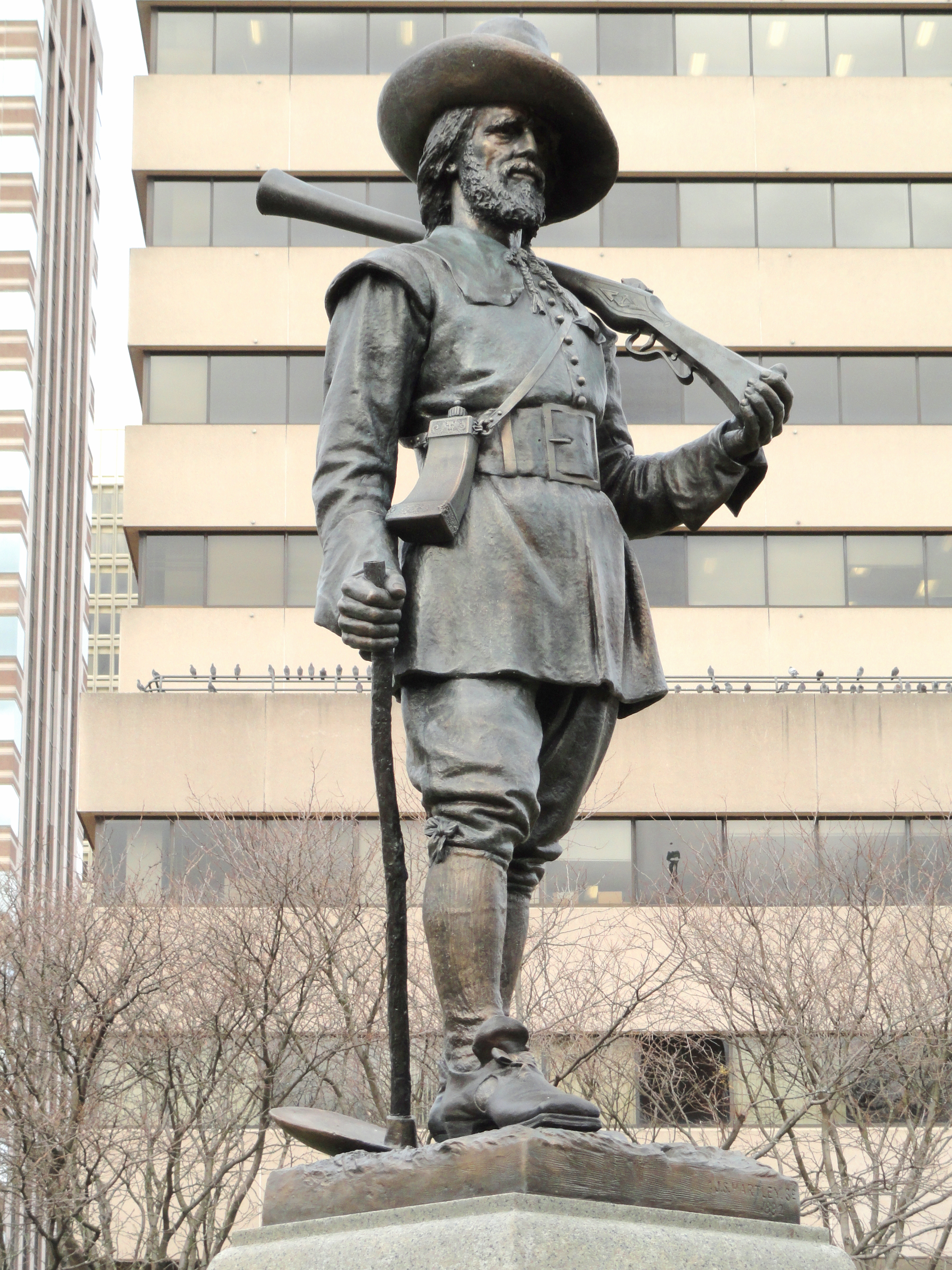
- Statue of Morgan by Jonathan Scott Hartley
- Born: 1616; Llandaff, Glamorganshire, Wales
- Died: 28 May 1699 (aged 82–83); Springfield, Massachusetts Bay
- Spouses: Prudence Gilbert (m. circa 1643); Elizabeth Bliss (m. 1669)
- Children: 9+
- Father: William Morgan
- Relatives: Ancestor of the Morgan family

Miles Morgan (1616 – 28 May 1699) was a Welsh colonist of America, a pioneer settler of what was to become Springfield, Massachusetts. Being one of the few settlers whose homesteads were successfully defended during the attack on Springfield, Morgan was lauded as a hero of King Philip's War in 1675 for providing shelter and successfully contacting troops in Hadley. Today, a statue of Miles Morgan stands in the city's Court Square in Metro Center. He is the great ancestor of well-known banker J.P. Morgan.

== Background ==
Of Welsh ancestry, Miles Morgan was born in 1616 in Llandaff, Glamorganshire, Wales. His family had been settled some years in Bristol, England, by the time Miles Morgan decided to set sail for the New World. He was aged 20 when he embarked from Bristol aboard the ship Mary. Accompanying him were his older brothers, James and John – either aboard the same ship, or travelling soon after Miles.

== Migration ==
Miles Morgan arrived at Boston in April 1636. Joined by his brothers, they lived in Roxbury, Massachusetts Bay for a time. (Note: James Morgan subsequently moved to Plymouth Colony and later settled in New Haven, Connecticut, where he became a member of the Colonial Assembly of Connecticut and fought in the Pequot War. John grew disgusted with the bigotry, superstition, and the persecutions (including the witch trials) then taking place in New England and moved to Virginia.)

Soon after settling, Miles married Prudence Gilbert. Morgan family lore maintained that they had become acquainted on the voyage from Bristol, Gilbert being aboard the ship with her family. Once settled in Agawam he had a letter proposing marriage written to Gilbert, who had settled in Beverly, north of Boston. She accepted and in 1642, accompanied by a Native American guide, a pack horse, and two companions, Miles set out for Beverly, where the couple were married. Prudence, her possessions piled on the horse, walked the 120 miles (190 km) back to Springfield with her new husband.

== Springfield ==
Miles joined the company of Sir William Pynchon in the colonization of western Massachusetts and was one of the founders of the city of Springfield, originally named Agawam after the Indian tribes that lived in the area. One of the company of colonists, Miles, though he was only 21 years of age, quickly became the second-in-command. He was one of the leading citizens of the new town and was regarded as an intrepid Indian fighter, farmer, and town leader. He had been given the title of "Sergeant Morgan" on the journey from Boston. In addition to establishing the farms that meant survival to the colonists he was also the butcher in the community and, in later years, operated a boat on the Connecticut River, trading with other colonists and with the Indians. He was subsequently known as "Captain Morgan." Unable to read or write, his mark on the town records was the sign of an anchor.

Morgan built one of the few fortified houses in town, on a bank of the Connecticut River. (Note: In the late 19th century, the site of Morgan's blockhouse was occupied by the car shops of the Connecticut River Railroad) He was active in the local militia and was depended upon in the protection of the frontier town. By 1658, Morgan is listed as a sergeant. Miles appears in the records as a selectman, constable, surveyor, fence viewer, and overseer of highways. He was also appointed to sit in the upper gallery of the church during services and maintain order among the young men in the congregation. ("... up in ye gallery, to give a check to disorders in youth and young men in tyme of God's worship"). Given the piety of the early settlers this was a position of some honor and also attests to his force of personality.

== Battle ==
During the fighting that swept the colony during King Philip's War in 1675, Springfield was attacked by the indigenous people. On 5 October 1675, much of the colonizer town, along with stored supplies needed for the winter, were destroyed. During the attack, Morgan's fortified blockhouse became a place of refuge for the town's colonists. Under Morgan's command, they held off the attack. After the burning of the settlement, an Indian servant who worked for Morgan managed to escape and headed for Hadley, where he alerted the Massachusetts Bay Colony's standing army, on maneuvers there at the time. Commanded by Major Samuel Appleton, the Massachusetts Bay troops broke through to Springfield and drove off the attackers.

Morgan's sons also fought in battles with Indians of the territory. His third son, Peletiah, was killed in a battle in 1676, at the age of 26.

== Personal life ==
Prudence Gilbert, Morgan's wife, gave birth to eight children, seven of whom reached adulthood: four boys and three girls. Prudence died in 1660, and Miles married again in 1669, to Elizabeth Bliss of Hartford. It was through the son he had with his second wife, Nathaniel Morgan, that Miles' banking descendants arose.

According to the records, in 1673 Hannah Merrick, unmarried daughter of Thomas Merrick, accused Miles's son Jonathan with the paternity of her child. Miles provided his son's bail and Jonathan fought the charge. The court found him guilty, however, and ordered him to pay two shillings, six pence towards the child's support for four years. Jonathan's second wife eventually got a full confession from Hannah (the records do not indicate how) and Hannah was condemned to pay a fine of seven Pounds or receive twenty lashes as punishment for her perjury. Jonathan, not letting matters lie, then filed a suit charging slander against Hannah's father, but lost. Eight years later Miles was again in trouble over a child. His daughter Lydia worked in the household of the family of Samuel Gaines, who became the father of her child. Miles filed charges and won his suit and Mr. Gaines was ordered to pay child support.

Miles Morgan died on 28 May 1699 in Springfield, Massachusetts, and was buried there.

== Memorial ==
A bronze statue of Captain Miles Morgan in Court Square in Springfield shows him in huntsman's dress and cocked hat, with a rifle over his shoulder. This statue, completed in 1882, was the first important work of Jonathan Scott Hartley.

Captain Morgan was a seventh-generation ancestor of financier John Pierpont Morgan.
