= Willys–Overland Block =

Historic place in Massachusetts, United States

- U.S. National Register of Historic Places
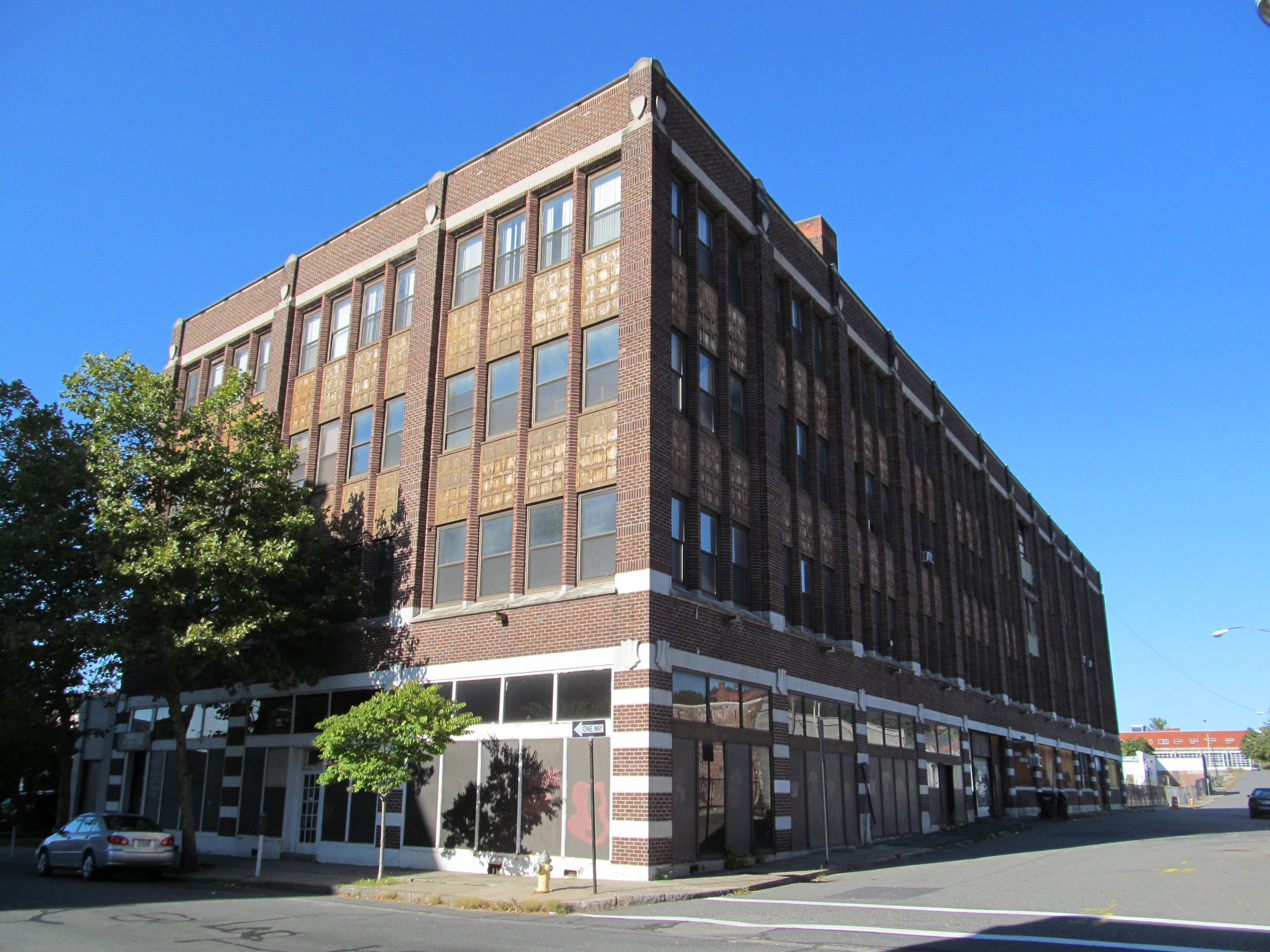
- Willys–Overland Block

- Location within Massachusetts Location within the United States
- Location: Springfield, Massachusetts
- Coordinates: 42°6′21″N 72°35′24″W
- Built: 1916
- Architect: Mills, Rhines, Bellman & Nordhoff
- Architectural style: Early Commercial
- MPS: Downtown Springfield MRA
- NRHP reference No.: 83000778
- Added to NRHP: February 24, 1983

The Willys–Overland Block is a historic commercial and industrial block at 151-157 Chestnut and 10-20 Winter Streets in downtown Springfield, Massachusetts. Built in 1916, it is a surviving reminder of Springfield early history in the manufacture and sale of automobile, housing the sales showroom and service center for the Willys–Overland Company. It was listed on the National Register of Historic Places on February 24, 1983.

== Description and history ==
The Willys–Overland Block is located in downtown Springfield, at the northeast corner of Chestnut and Winter Streets. It is a four-story masonry structure, finished in brick with stone trim. The building's external appearance is one more typically associated with commercial buildings, disguising its original use as a more industrial facility. Its bays are divided into groups of four bays on the upper floors, with sections that would roughly correspond to retail storefronts on the ground floor; these groups are separated by buttress-like projections with medallions at the top. The building's original uses included an automotive showroom and sales facility, and a 1000-car garage and service facility.

The block was built in 1916 for the Willys–Overland Company. It sold and serviced its automobiles here before and after the company became Jeep in the 1960s. Located in the three blocks surrounding the Apremont Triangle Historic District and the famed Hotel Kimball, Willys–Overland was among numerous early and mid-twentieth century automobile sellers in the neighborhood. Others included Rolls-Royce and Pontiac.

In 2011, the Willys–Overland Block was home to three separate churches, a parking garage, and a Hispanic radio station. In 2015, the Springfield City Council established a historic district around the block, after the building owner sought its demolition rather than effect repairs incurred by a gas explosion in 2012.

== See also ==
- Willys–Overland Building, St. Louis, Missouri, also designed by Mills, Rhines, Bellman & Nordhoff
- National Register of Historic Places listings in Springfield, Massachusetts
- National Register of Historic Places listings in Hampden County, Massachusetts
