= St. Louis Auto Show =

The St. Louis Auto Show is an auto show held annually in St. Louis, Missouri. The first St. Louis Auto Show was held in 1907 at Forest Park Highlands; it was first held indoors at the Willys-Overland Building on Locust Street in 1917. Since resumption of the show in 1983, it has been held annually at the America's Center convention center and, since its construction in 1996, at the adjacent Edward Jones Dome.

In the most recent show, which took place in January 2012, its exhibits featured more than 25 automobile and motorcycle brands, including Acura, Buick, Cadillac, Chevrolet, Chrysler, Dodge, Fiat, Ford, Harley Davidson, Honda, Hyundai, Jeep, Kia, Lexus, Lincoln, Mazda, Nissan, Scion, Subaru, Toyota, Volkswagen, and Volvo. The show also featured a collection of supercars sponsored by St. Louis Motorsports, Inc., including cars manufactured by Bentley, Lamborghini, Lotus, Maserati, and Rolls-Royce. The 2012 show also included three "ride-and-drive" experiences in which attendees were able to drive new vehicles, an environmentally friendly automobile section, and the Camp Jeep experience, in which attendees were able to participate in indoor, off-road driving.

Historically, the show has included a variety of concept cars; in 1990, the show featured the 12-cylinder Cadillac Solitaire and the pivoting-canopied Plymouth Slingshot. During the 1991 show, organizers brought three Deloreans used in the filming of Back to the Future and a pre-production model of the Dodge Viper. For 1996, the show included models of the Cadillac Catera, the Plymouth Prowler, and the Lamborghini Diablo. Also in 1996, the auto show became the first convention to use the Edward Jones Dome for convention space. The 2001 show featured a pre-production model of the Ford Thunderbird and the GMC Envoy, while the 2005 show included the Jeep Hurricane concept car.
