= Willys–Overland Building =

- Willys-Overland Building
- U.S. National Register of Historic Places
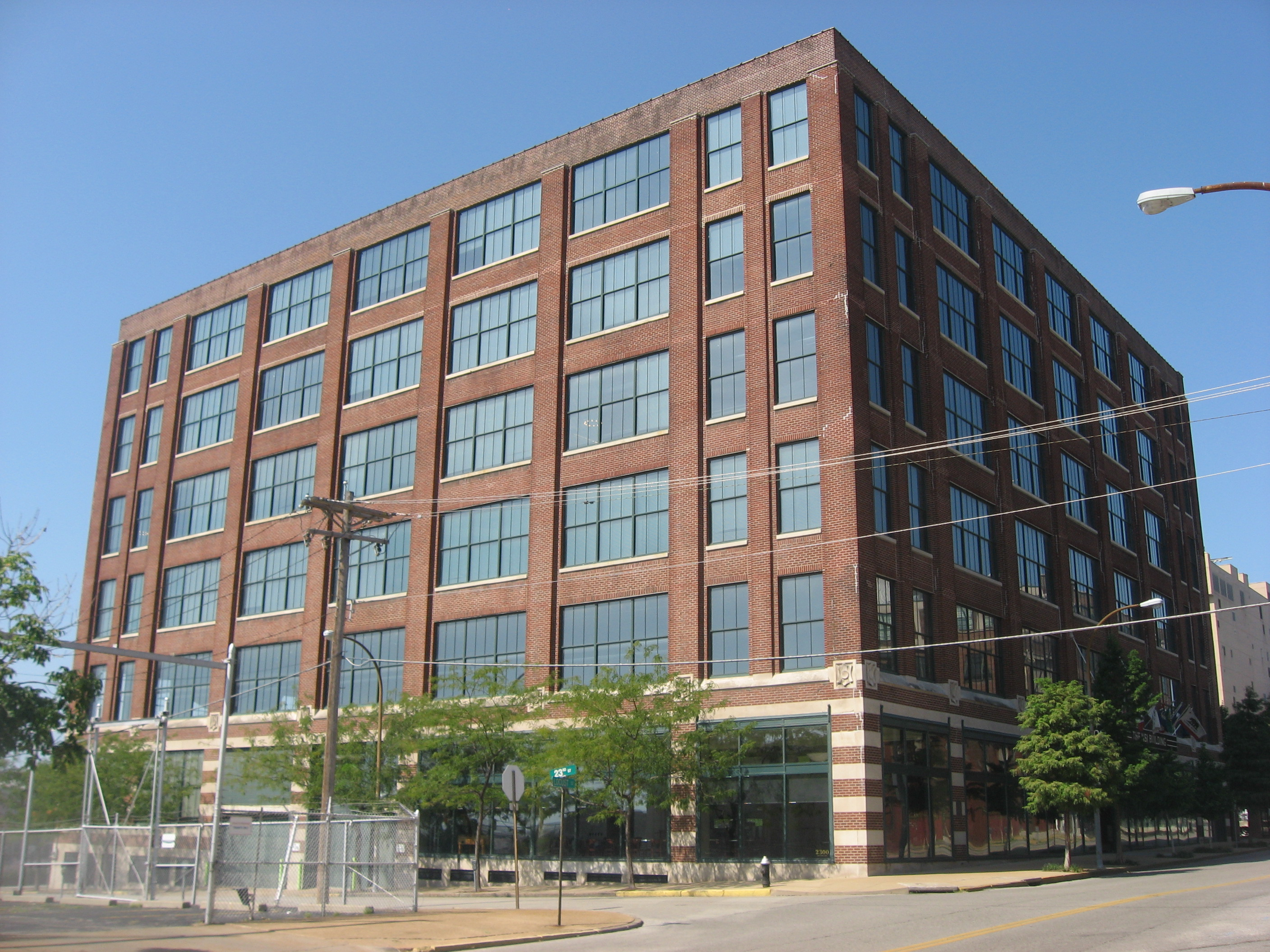

- Location within St. Louis Location within the United States
- Location: 2300 Locust St., St. Louis, Missouri
- Coordinates: 38°38′8″N 90°12′44″W
- Built: 1917
- Architect: Mills, Rhines, Bellman & Nordhoff
- Architectural style: Commercial Classical Revival
- NRHP reference No.: 99001617
- Added to NRHP: 1999

The Willys–Overland Building is a former automobile dealership and distribution building for the Willys-Overland Company in St. Louis, Missouri located at 2300 Locust Street. The building was the home of the company's main dealership and distributor in St. Louis from its completion in February 1917 until 1932, and upon its opening, it hosted the first indoor St. Louis Auto Show.

The building's exterior is a six-story brick facade with large windows on all sides and minimal ornamentation. Originally, the building had a showroom on its first floor, while upper floors included storage space and auto assembly rooms, connected by large freight elevators. The building also contained a body paint shop and a repair shop on its upper floors; to support the weight of the automobiles and shops, the floors are nearly one foot thick poured concrete.

At the time of its construction, it was the largest automobile dealership and distribution center in St. Louis. As a result of its size, the organizers of the St. Louis Auto Show negotiated to rent the building for their annual show, which since 1907 had been held outdoors at Forest Park Highlands. By 1927, the company had expanded such that its used car dealership moved to an adjacent building and the company was operating a dozen dealerships in the area, but the building remained the corporations regional headquarters through 1932.

However, the Great Depression brought economic hardship to the company, and in 1932, the building was vacated; it remained vacant through 1935, when it was sold to the American Fixture and Manufacturing Company. In 1963, it again was sold, and since that time various small businesses occupied the first floor with little activity on its upper floors. In 1999, the building was nominated and accepted to the National Register of Historic Places, and it underwent renovations by SJI Companies. In 2005, the building received another renovation, costing $12 million, and it was renamed the NSI Building.

== See also ==
- Willy's Overland Block, Springfield, Massachusetts, also designed by Mills, Rhines, Bellman & Nordhoff
