= George S. Mills =

American architect

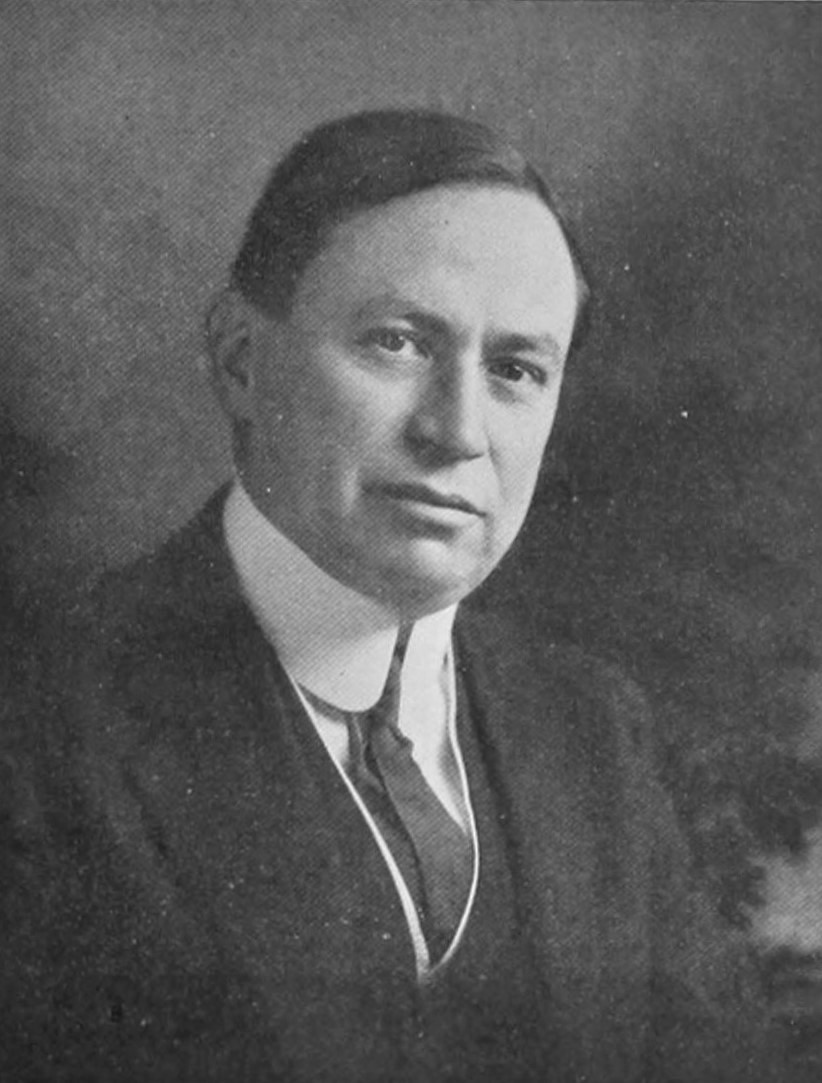
- George S. Mills, circa 1915
- Born: December 5, 1866; London, England
- Died: December 27, 1939 (aged 73); Toledo, Ohio
- Occupation: Architect

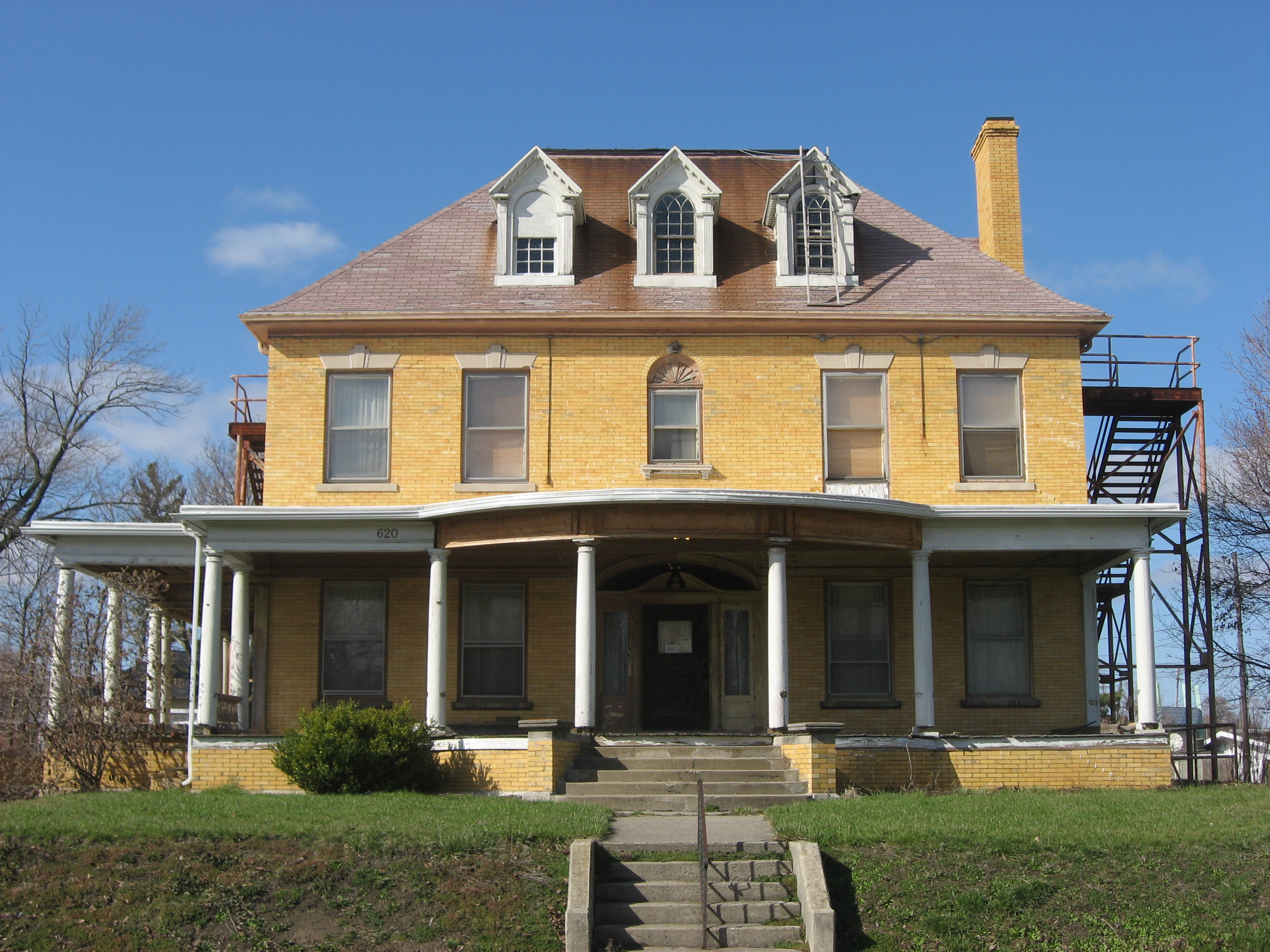
The Neely–Sieber House in Lima, Ohio, designed by Mills and built in 1904.

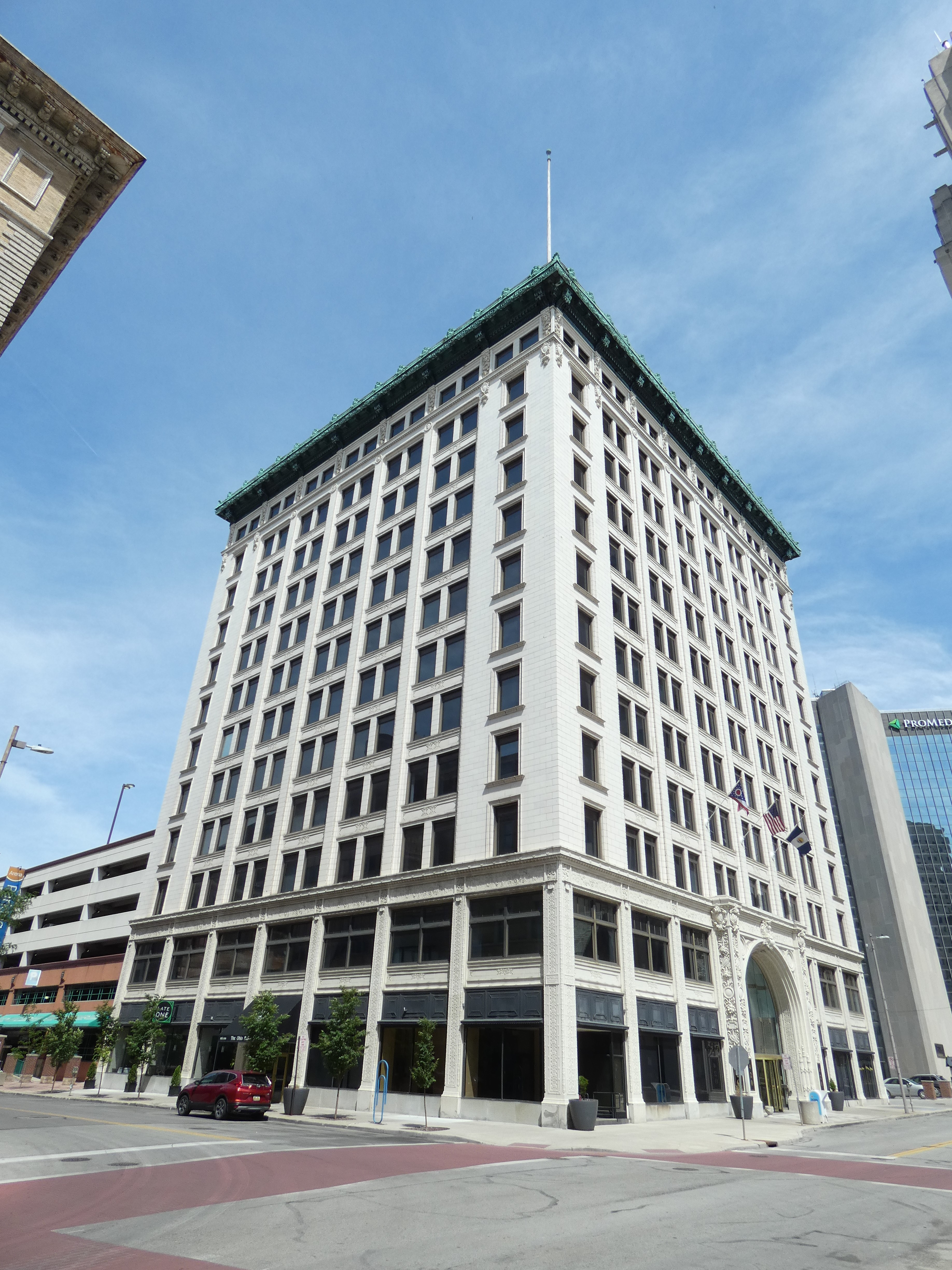
The Ohio Building in Toledo, completed in 1907.

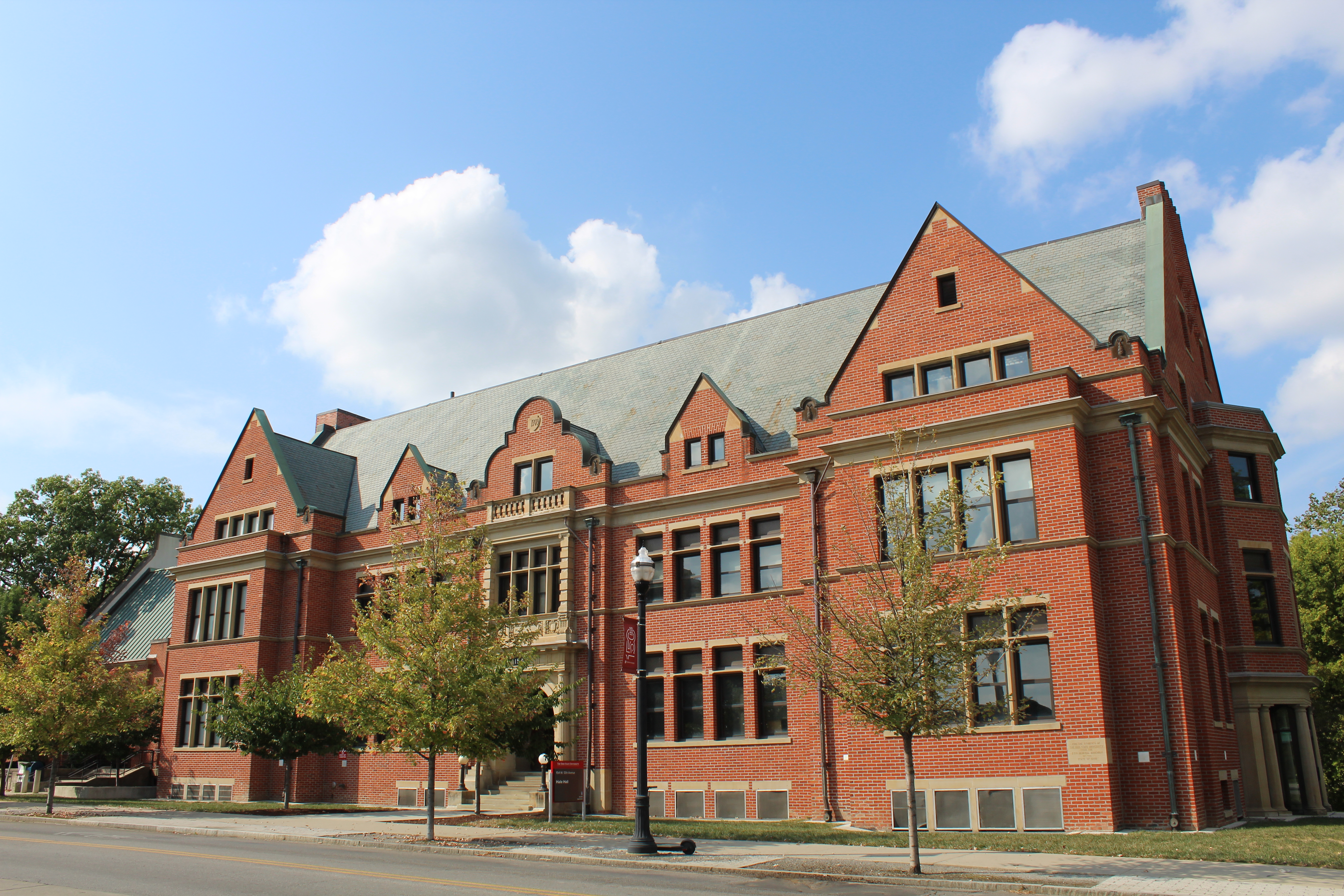
Hale Hall of the Ohio State University, completed in 1911.

George S. Mills FAIA (1866–1939) was an English-born American architect in practice in Toledo, Ohio from 1892 until 1939. He was cofounder of a successful architectural firm which operated until 1999.

== Life and career ==
George Strafford Mills was born December 5, 1866, in London to George Mills, a journalist, and Mary Huxley (Callow) Mills. In 1870 the family immigrated to the United States, settling in St. Louis. Mills was educated in the St. Louis public schools and in the manual training school of Washington University, graduating in 1884. He then joined the office of leading local architect George I. Barnett before moving to Toledo in 1885. There he was hired to teach mechanical drawing in the Toledo Manual Training School, now the University of Toledo, becoming superintendent of the school in 1887. In 1892 he left to enter private practice, forming a partnership with Harry W. Wachter which lasted until 1897. After dissolving their partnership Mills worked for fifteen years as an independent practitioner, becoming the leading architect in Toledo. In 1907 Mills completed the Ohio Building, one of the largest office buildings in the city, and moved his offices into it.

In 1912 Mills formed a partnership with three of his employees, George V. Rhines, Lawrence S. Bellman and Charles M. Nordhoff, in the new firm of Mills, Rhines, Bellman & Nordhoff. The firm was incorporated in 1929. From their base in Toledo this firm was responsible for buildings as far east as Boston and as far west as San Francisco. In 1944, following the deaths of his partners, Bellman assumed control of the firm, renaming it Bellman, Gillett & Richards. The firm was later known as Richards, Bauer & Moorhead under John N. Richards and as Bauer, Stark & Lashbrook under Orville H. Bauer before closing in 1999. Works of these successor firms, in association with others, include the Front Street office buildings in Columbus and the former Fiberglas Tower, once the tallest building in Toledo.

Mills joined the American Institute of Architects in 1900 and was elected a Fellow in 1915. In 1914 Mills was instrumental in the formation of the Toledo chapter, and served as its secretary. From 1918 to 1919 he served a single term as second vice president of the national organization.

== Personal life ==
Mills was married in 1895 to Alice Baker, a Toledo native. She died in 1913, and he remarried to Stella Peterson. He had two daughters, both with his first wife. He later remarried to Stella Peterson. An Anglican, Mills was a parishioner of Trinity Episcopal Church. Mills died December 27, 1939, in Toledo at the age of 73. He was buried in Woodlawn Cemetery.

== Legacy ==
Several buildings designed by Mills and his firm have been listed on the National Register of Historic Places, and others contribute to listed historic districts.

== Architectural works ==
- Burt's Theater, 725 Jefferson Ave, Toledo, Ohio (1897–98, NRHP 1977)
- Berdan Building, 601 Washington St, Toledo, Ohio (1902, NRHP 1975)
- Neely-Sieber House, 600 W Spring St, Lima, Ohio (1904, NRHP 1976)
- Ohio Building, 420 Madison Ave, Toledo, Ohio (1906–07)
- Secor Hotel, 425 Jefferson Ave, Toledo, Ohio (1908, NRHP 1976)
- Hale Hall, Ohio State University, Columbus, Ohio (1909–11, NRHP 1979)

See Mills, Rhines, Bellman & Nordhoff for works after 1912.

== Drawings and contemporary views ==
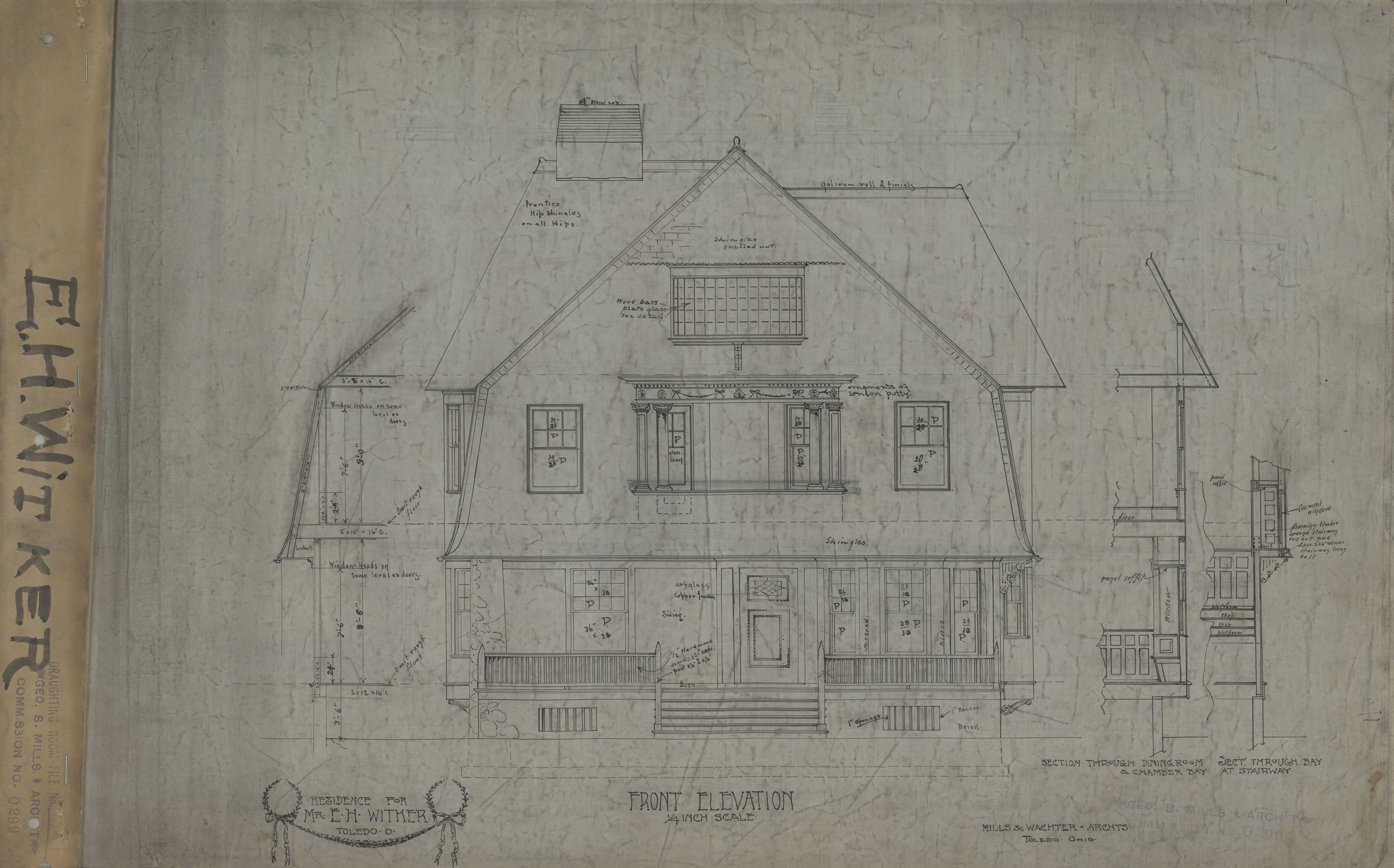
Architectural drawing for a Mills and Wachter designed home in the Old West End of Toledo, Ohio, 1890s

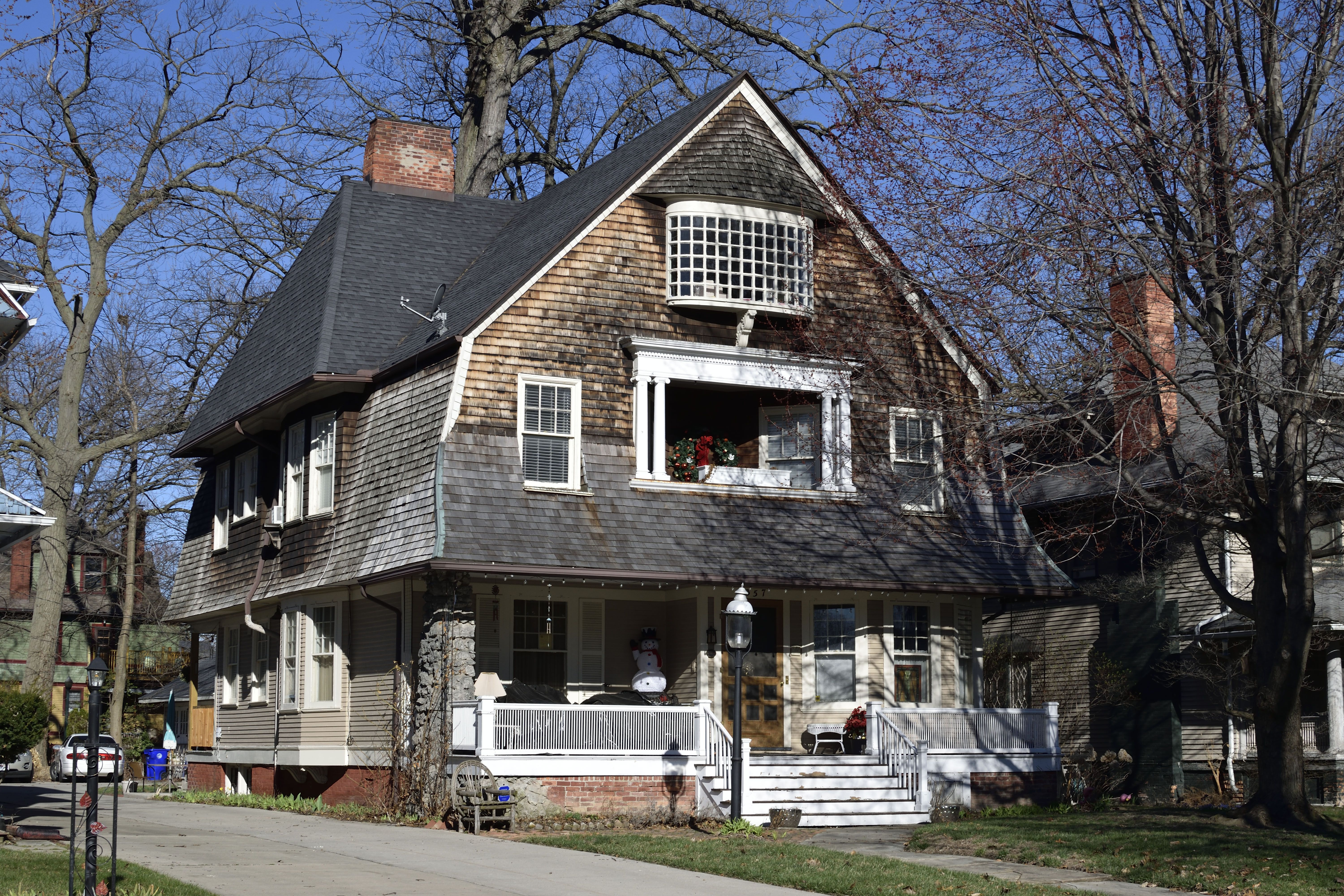
Mills and Wachter designed home in the Old West End of Toledo, Ohio, 2019

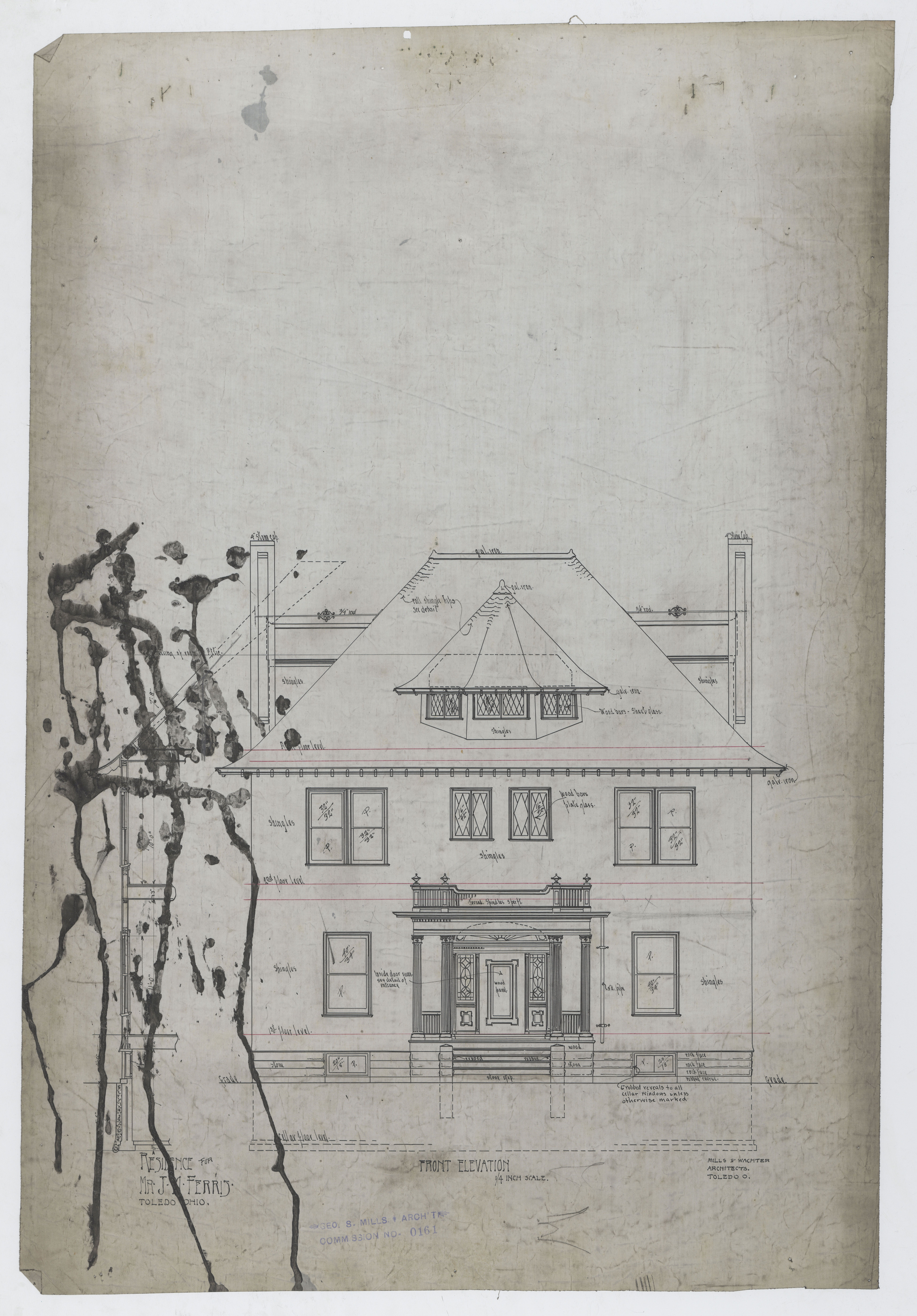
Architectural drawing for a Mills and Wachter designed home in the Old West End of Toledo, Ohio, 1890s

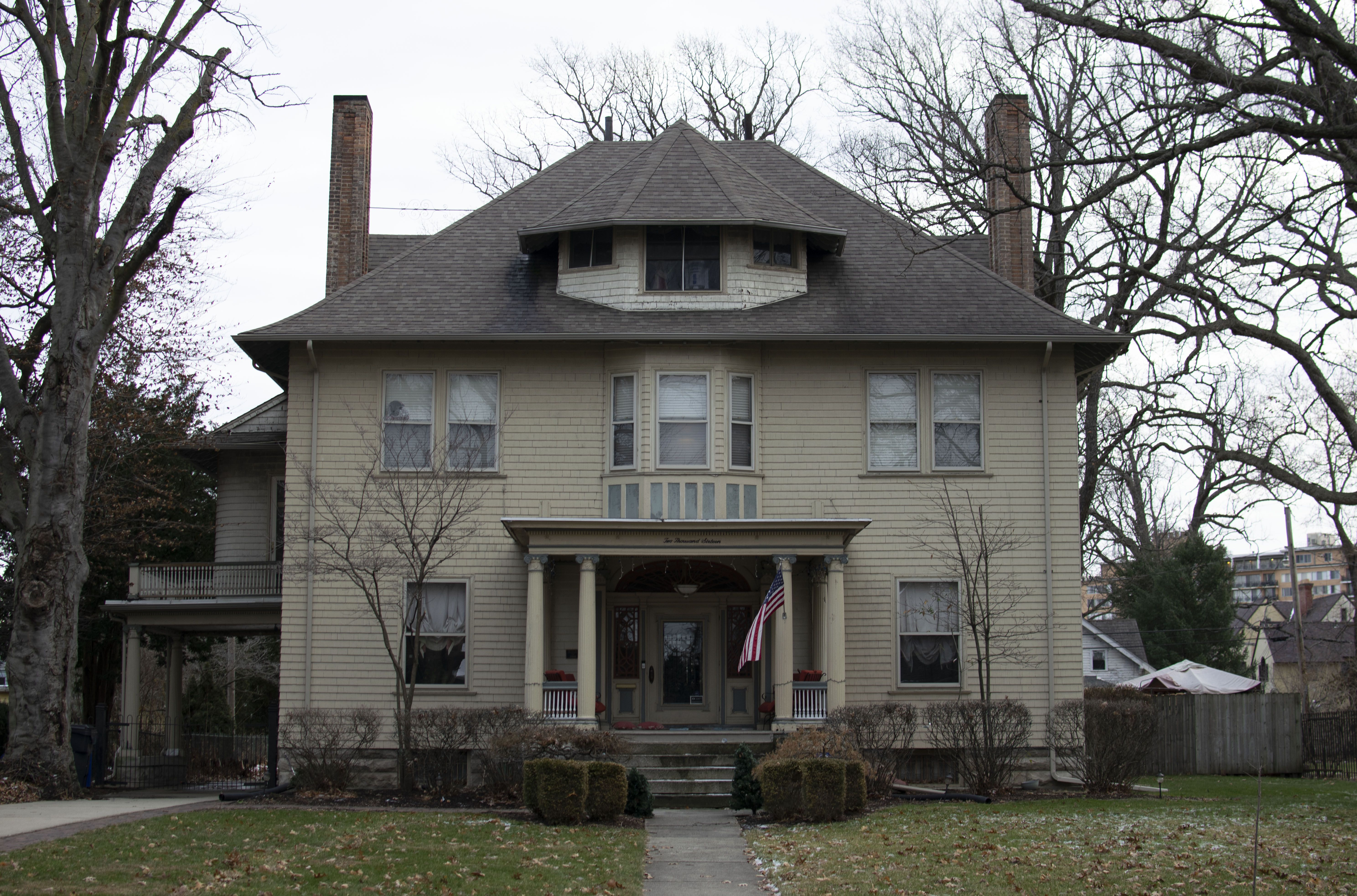
Mills and Wachter designed home in the Old West End of Toledo, Ohio, 2020

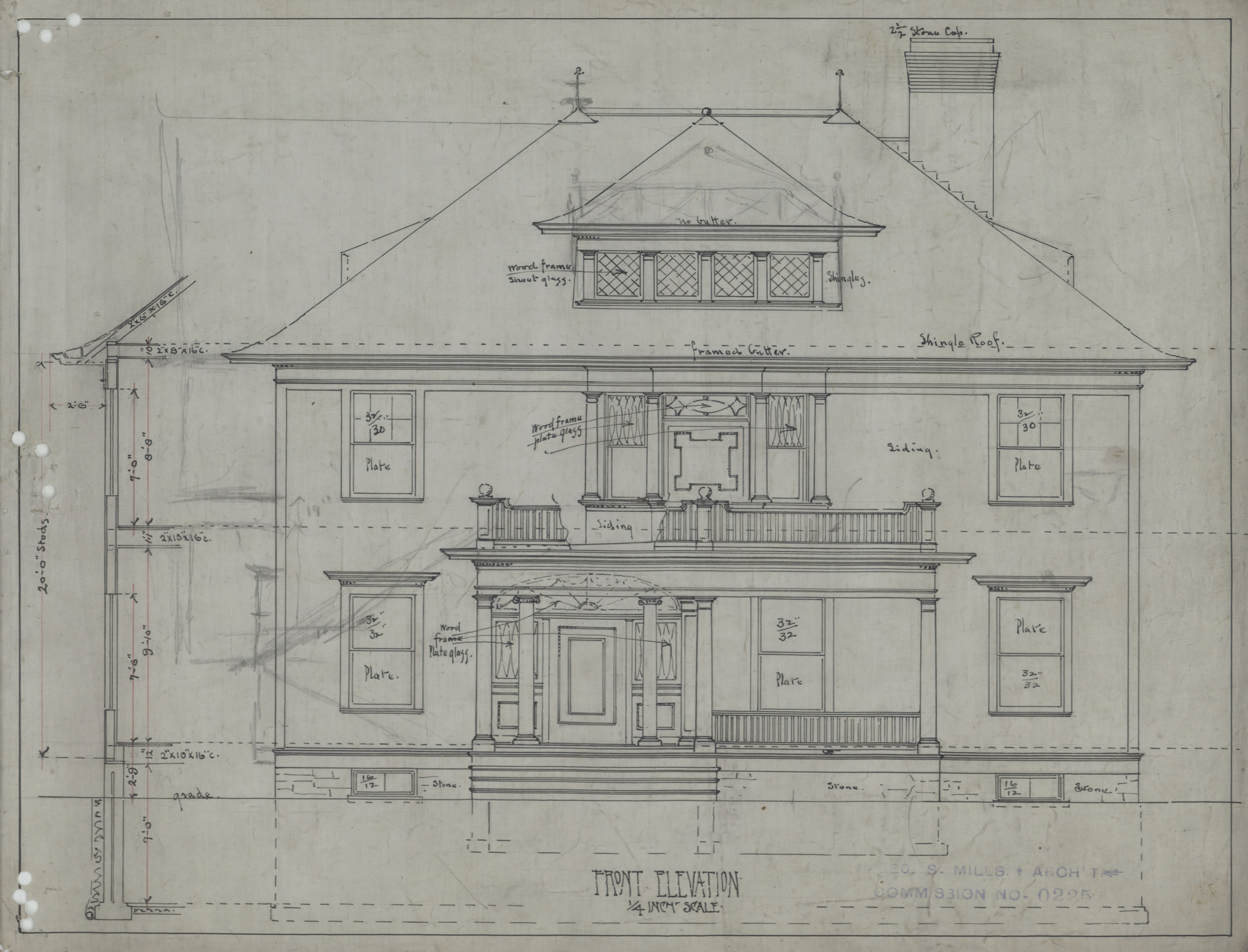
Architectural drawing for the home that George S. Mills designed for himself in the Old West End neighborhood of Toledo, Ohio in 1895
