= Mills, Rhines, Bellman & Nordhoff =

American architectural firm

Practice information
- Founders: George S. Mills
- Founded: 1912
- Dissolved: 1999
- Location: Toledo, Ohio

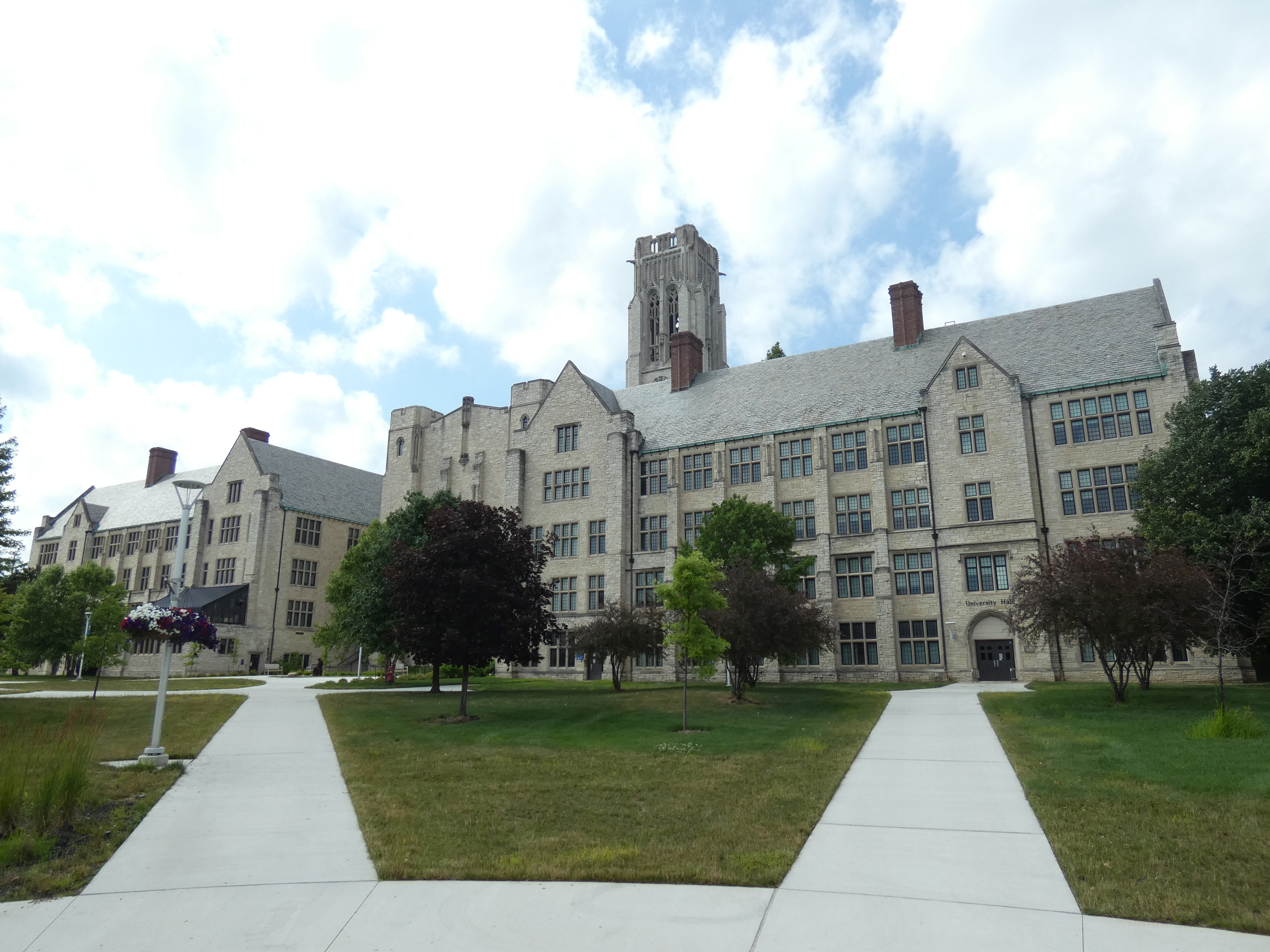
University Hall of the University of Toledo, completed in 1931.

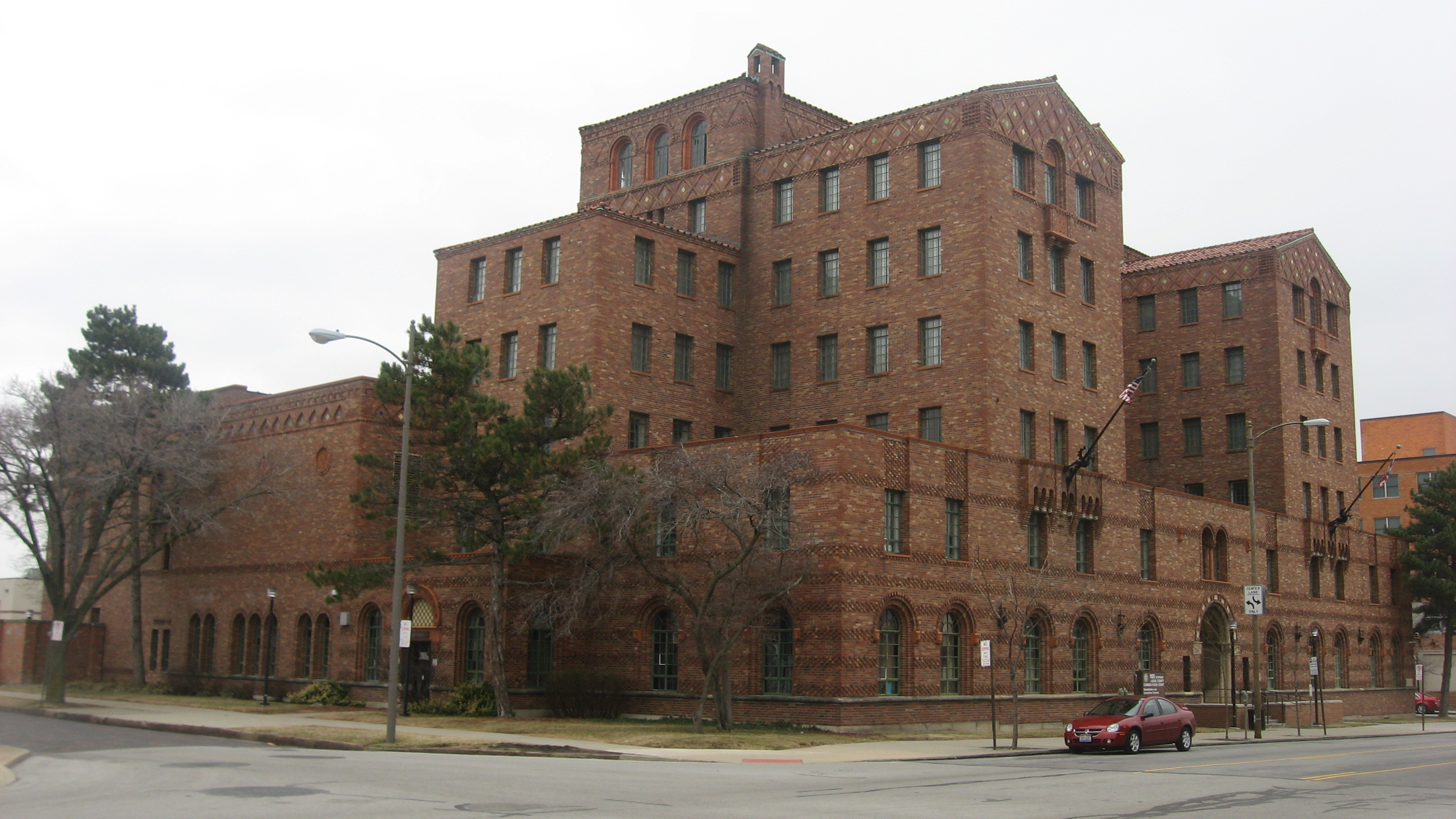
The Toledo Central YMCA, completed in 1935.

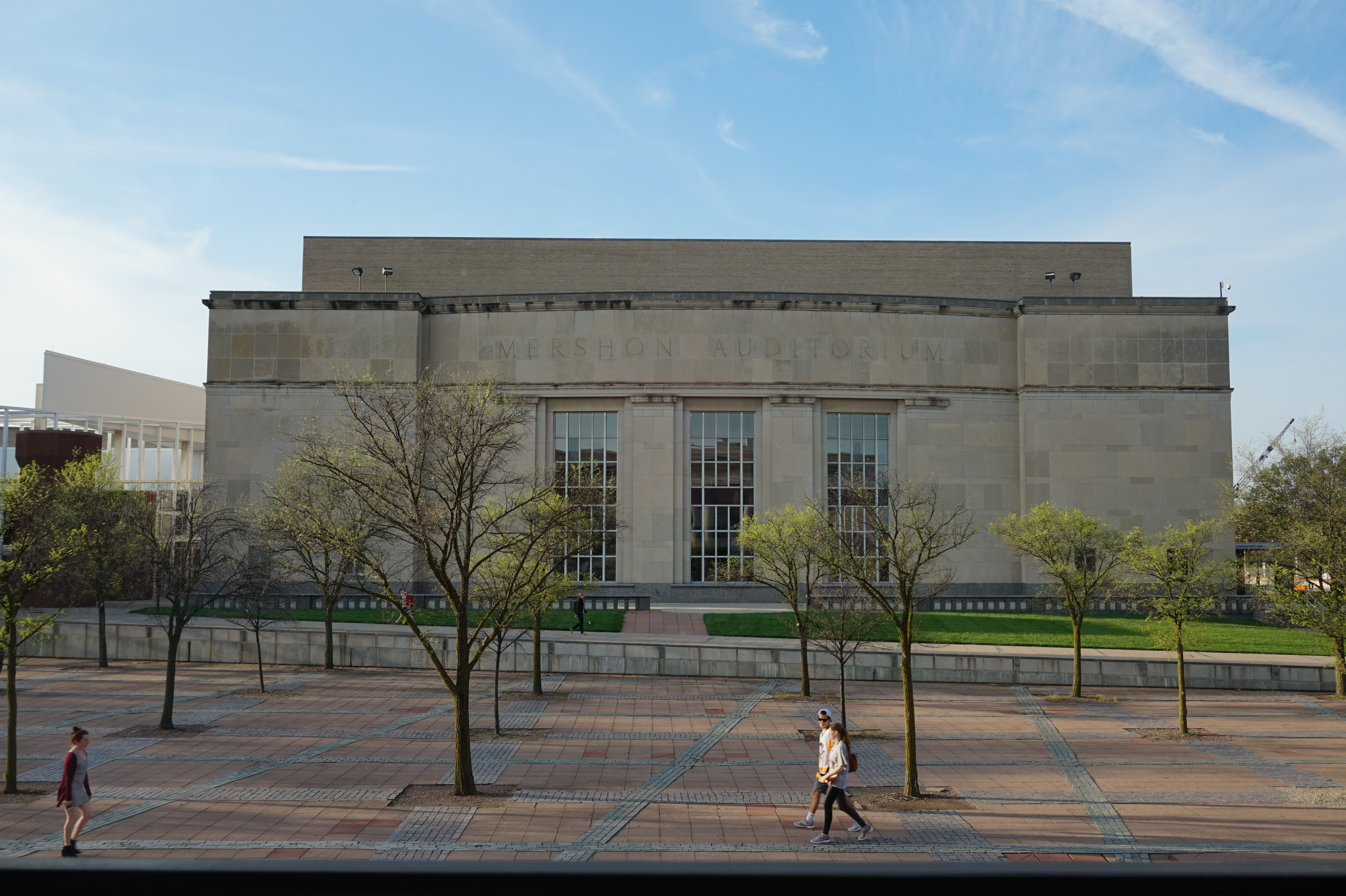
Mershon Auditorium of the Ohio State University, completed in 1957.

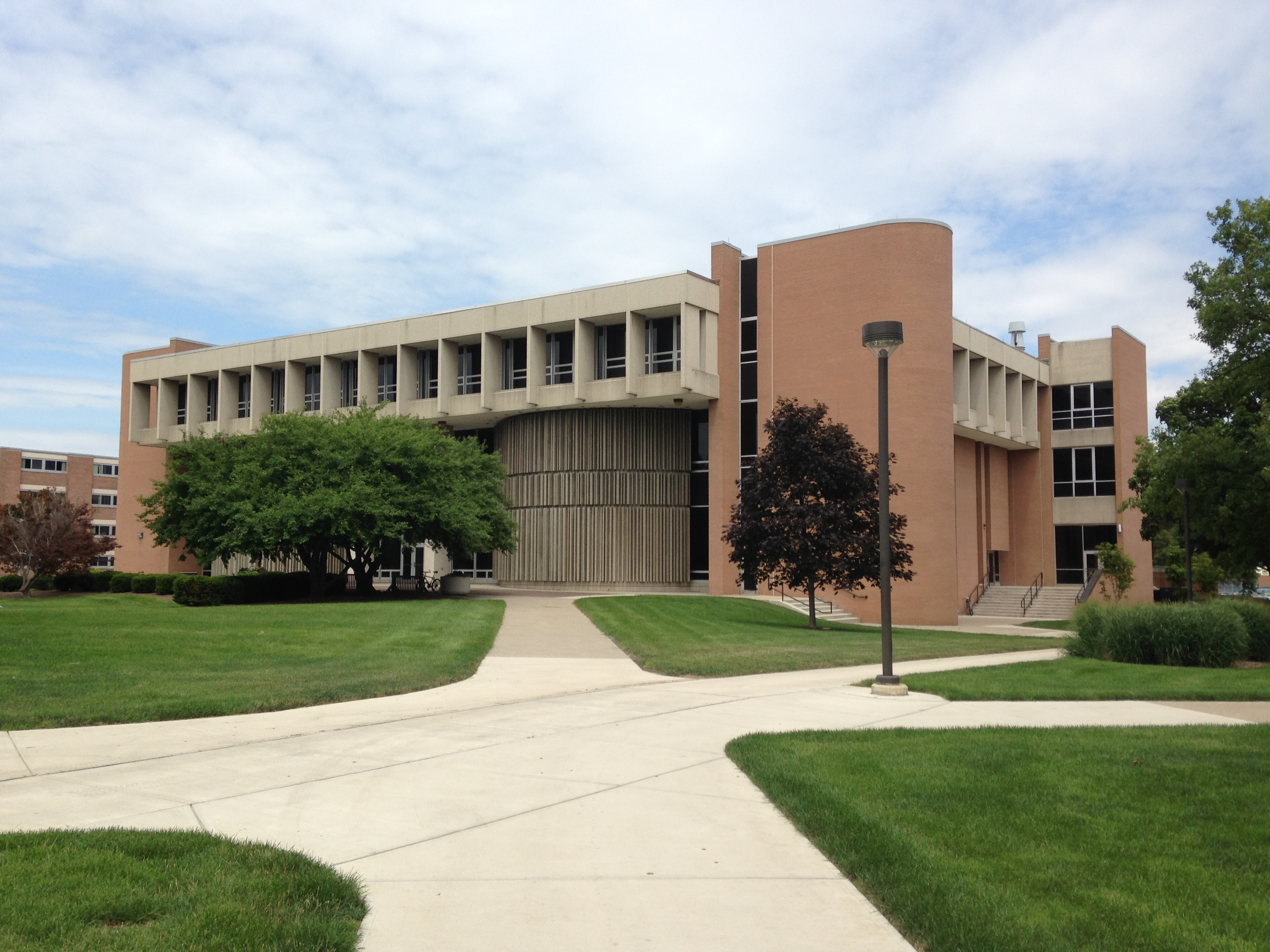
The Mathematical Sciences Building of Bowling Green State University, completed in 1970.

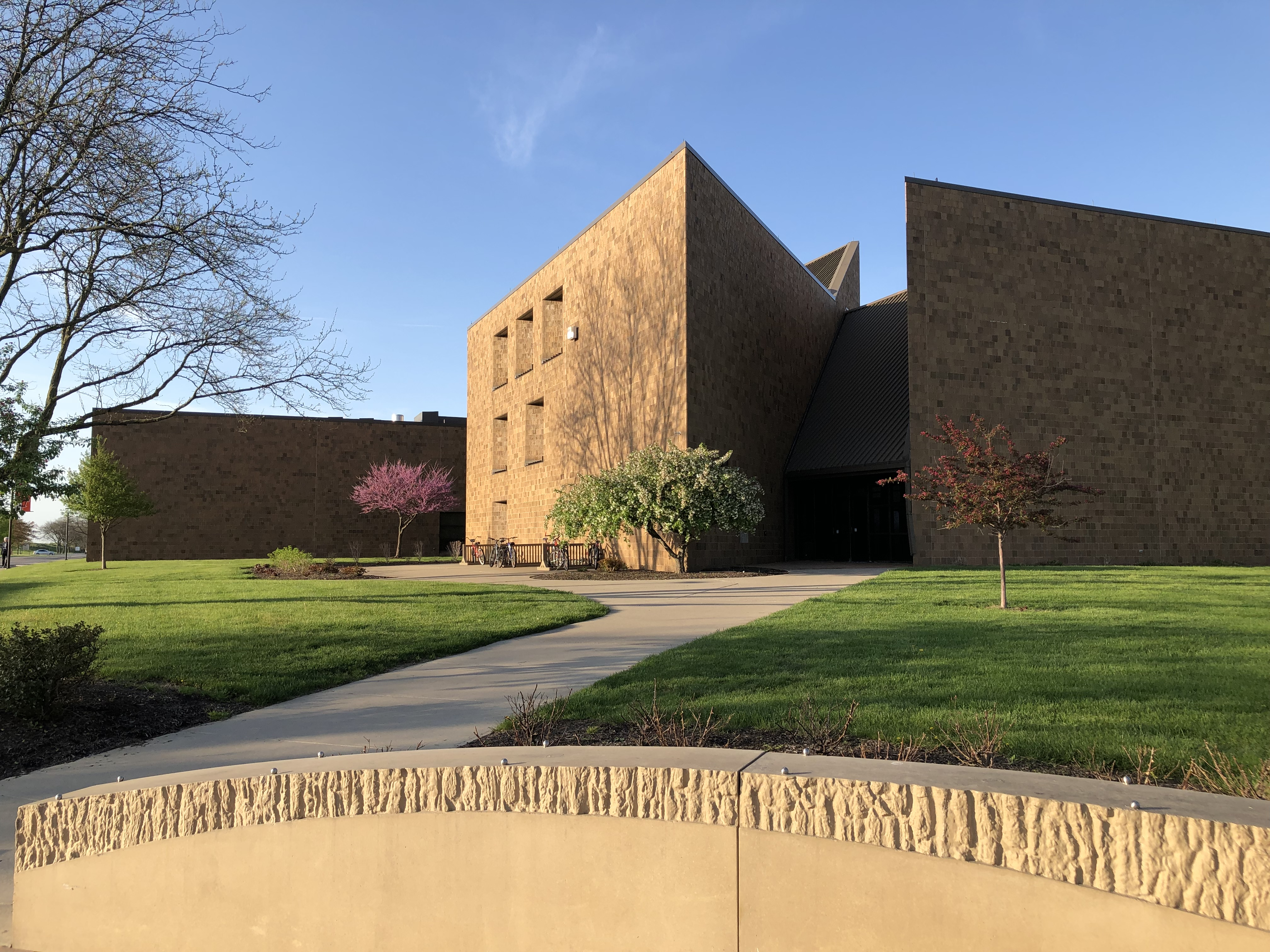
The Moore Musical Arts Center at Bowling Green State University, completed in 1979.

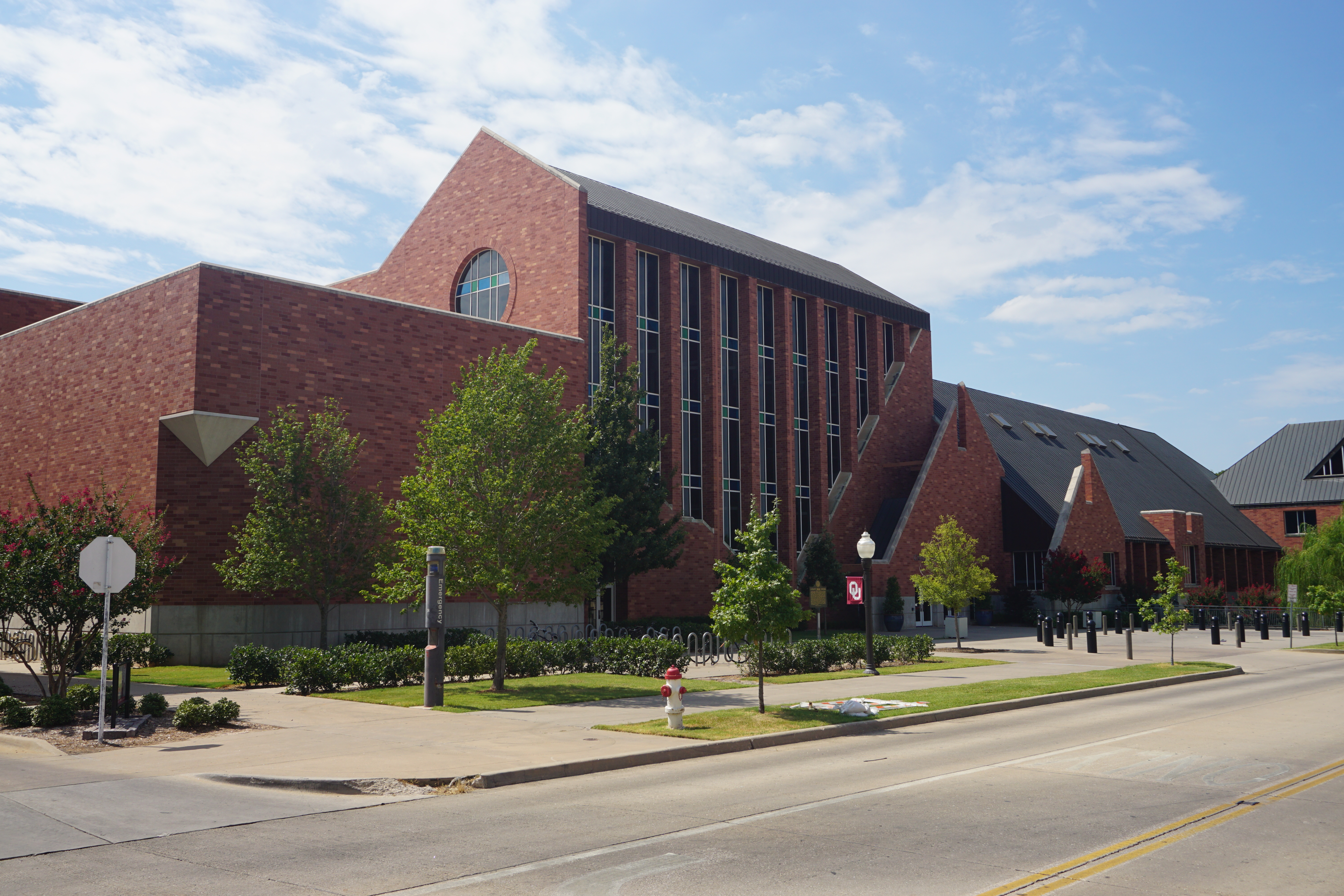
The Catlett Music Center of the University of Oklahoma, completed in 1986.

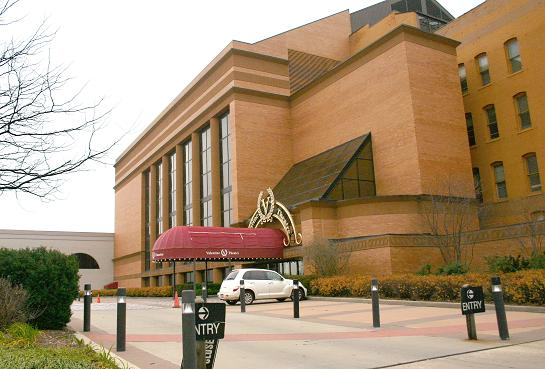
The Valentine Theatre in Toledo, restored and reopened in 1999.

Mills, Rhines, Bellman & Nordhoff was an architectural firm founded in Toledo, Ohio in 1912. Renamed Bellman, Gillett & Richards in 1944, Richards, Bauer & Moorhead in 1962 and Bauer, Stark & Lashbrook in 1979, it closed in 1999.

== Organizational history ==
The firm of Mills, Rhines, Bellman & Nordhoff was formed in 1912 as a partnership between noted Toledo architect George S. Mills (1866–1939) and three of his employees: George V. Rhines (1875–1938), Lawrence S. Bellman (1876–1951) and Charles M. Nordhoff (1877–1950). After World War I two new partners were added: architect Chester B. Lee (1876–1933) in 1920 and mechanical and electrical engineer John Gillett (1882–1960) in 1922. In 1929, the firm was incorporated, with the former partners becoming shareholders. Rhines died in 1938, and in 1939 architect Reeve K. Biggers (1913–1998) was made a principal. Mills died shortly thereafter, and in 1940 another architect, John N. Richards (1904–1982), was added. Biggers left the firm during World War II, and upon Nordhoff's retirement in 1944 the firm was reorganized by the remaining principals as Bellman, Gillett & Richards. In 1949, Bellman retired and two new principals, George H. Erard (1891–1959) and Michael B. O'Shea (1897–1969), were admitted. In 1954, Gillett retired, and three more principals, architect Orville H. Bauer (1921–1979) and engineers Raymond A. Etzel (1901–1976) and Robert C. Moorhead (1911–2005), were added.

In 1962, Richards became head of the firm, which was reorganized by the senior principals as Richards, Bauer & Moorhead. Two more principals were added in 1971, architect Charles H. Stark III (1935–2012) and engineer Dean L. Lashbrook (1923–2001). Richards retired in 1976, leaving Bauer as senior principal. In early 1979, the firm was renamed Bauer, Stark & Lashbrook to reflect this change, but Bauer died only a few months later. Lashbrook retired in the early 1990s, leaving Stark as senior principal. In 1999, when Stark formally closed the firm, it was noted as the oldest surviving architectural firm in Ohio.

Mills, Rhines, Bellman & Nordhoff and its successors were Toledo's leading architectural firm. They designed many of the city's most prominent buildings, and developed a national reputation before World War II. The firm was involved in important local projects until the very end. One of their last was the restoration of the Valentine Theatre, originally opened in 1895 and reopened in 1999 after an extensive restoration led by Stark.

== Legacy ==
As members of a leading architectural firm, the principals of Mills, Rhines, Bellman & Nordhoff and its successors were well respected members of their professions. Mills, Bellman, Richards and Bauer were all elected Fellows of the American Institute of Architects, and Richards served as AIA president from 1958 to 1960. They and their associates also frequently held leadership posts in local architectural and engineering organizations.

The firm and its individual partners designed a number of buildings that are listed on the United States National Register of Historic Places for their architecture.

== Architectural works ==
=== Mills, Rhines, Bellman & Nordhoff, 1912–1943 ===
- Toledo Club, 235 14th St, Toledo, Ohio (1914–15)
- Willys–Overland Block, 151 Chestnut St, Springfield, Massachusetts (1916, NRHP 1983)
- Willys–Overland Building, 2300 Locust St, St. Louis, Missouri (1917, NRHP 1993)
- Blissfield State Bank Building, (Note: A contributing resource to the Blissfield Downtown Historic District, NRHP–listed in 2015.) 103 S Lane St, Blissfield, Michigan (1922–23)
- Toledo Safety Building, 525 N Erie St, Toledo, Ohio (1923–26)
- Commodore Perry Hotel, 505 Jefferson Ave, Toledo, Ohio (1924–27, NRHP 1997))
- Ohio Bell Telephone Building, 121 N Huron St, Toledo, Ohio (1925)
- Gordon N. Mather house, 30267 Hickory Hill Dr, Perrysburg, Ohio (1926–27)
- Campbell Baking Company building, 325 Commercial St, Waterloo, Iowa (1927, NRHP 2016)
- Daughters of America National Home, 652 N Sandusky St, Tiffin, Ohio (1928–30, NRHP 2003)
- PNC Bank Building, 405 Madison Ave, Toledo, Ohio (1929–30)
- University Hall, University of Toledo, Toledo, Ohio (1929–31)
- Field House, University of Toledo, Toledo, Ohio (1930–31)
- Central YMCA, 1110 Jefferson Ave, Toledo, Ohio (1934–35, NRHP 1982)
- Haughton Elevator Company office building, 671 Center St, Toledo, Ohio (1940, demolished)

=== Bellman, Gillett & Richards, 1944–1962 ===
- Ohio Union, Ohio State University, Columbus, Ohio (1949–51, demolished 2006)
- Child Study Institute, 428 10th St, Toledo, Ohio (1953)
- Gillham Hall, University of Toledo, Toledo, Ohio (1953)
- Clay High School, 5665 Seaman Rd, Oregon, Ohio (1954)
- Mershon Auditorium, Ohio State University, Columbus, Ohio (1955–57)
- St. Michael's in the Hills Episcopal Church, 4718 Brittany Rd, Ottawa Hills, Ohio (1957–58)
- Health and Human Services Building, University of Toledo, Toledo, Ohio (1960)
- Ohio Bell Telephone Building, 130 N Erie St, Toledo, Ohio (1960)
- Columbia Gas Building, 701 Jefferson Ave, Toledo, Ohio (1961)
- Lebanon Correctional Institution, 3791 OH-63 Lebanon, Ohio (1961)
- Federal Office Building, 234 N Summit St, Toledo, Ohio (1962, demolished 2001)
- Front Street office buildings, (Note: In association with Potter, Tyler, Martin & Roth of Cincinnati and Tully & Hobbs of Columbus.) 25 and 145 S Front St, Columbus, Ohio (1962–64)

=== Richards, Bauer & Moorhead, 1962–1978 ===
- Beeghly Library, Heidelberg University, Tiffin, Ohio (1967)
- Fiberglas Tower, (Note: In association with Harrison & Abramovitz of New York City.) 200 N St Clair St, Toledo, Ohio (1967–69)
- Life Sciences Building, Bowling Green State University, Bowling Green, Ohio (1968)
- Kent Student Center, Kent State University, Kent, Ohio (1969–73)
- Mathematical Sciences Building, Bowling Green State University, Bowling Green, Ohio (1970)
- Moore Musical Arts Center, Bowling Green State University, Bowling Green, Ohio (1976–79)

=== Bauer, Stark & Lashbrook, 1979–1999 ===
- Catlett Music Center, (Note: In association with Kaighn Associates of Norman.) University of Oklahoma, Norman, Oklahoma (1985–86)
- Valentine Theatre restoration, 410 Adams St, Toledo, Ohio (1996–1999)
- All Saints Catholic Church, 628 Lime City Rd, Rossford, Ohio (1997–2002)
