= Neely–Sieber House =

Historic house in Ohio, United States

- U.S. National Register of Historic Places
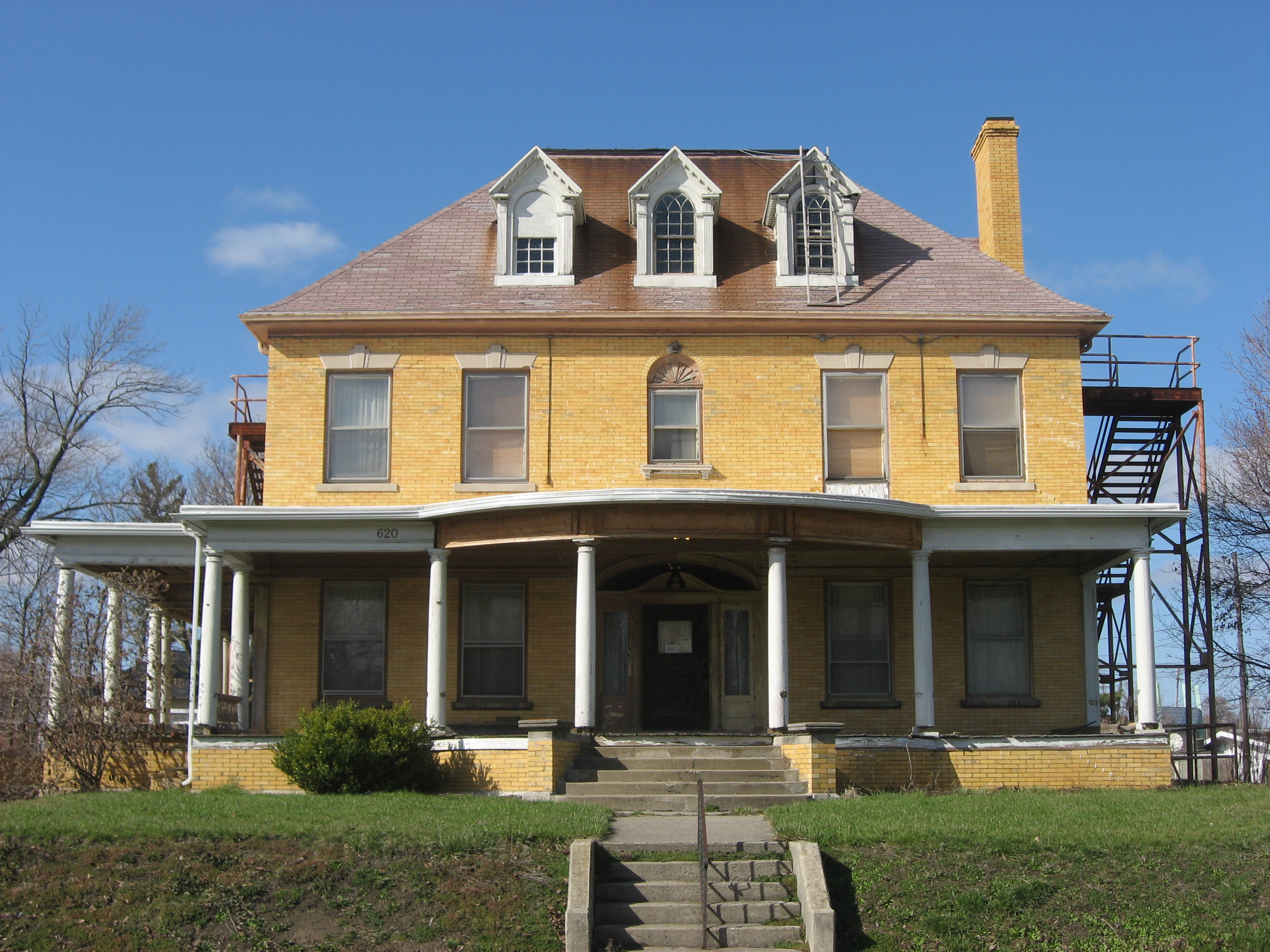
- Front of the house

- Location within Ohio Location within the United States
- Location: 620 W. Spring St., Lima, Ohio
- Coordinates: 40°44′19″N 84°6′52″W
- Area: less than one acre
- Built: 1904
- Architect: George S. Mills
- Architectural style: Colonial Revival, Georgian Revival
- NRHP reference No.: 76001360
- Added to NRHP: December 12, 1976

The Neely–Sieber House is a historic house on the west side of Lima, Ohio, United States. Designed by George S. Mills and built in 1904, the house combines elements of the Colonial Revival and Georgian architectural styles.

== Owners ==
This three-story brick house is named for its first and second owners, John D. Neely and Frank X. Sieber. An oil baron from Oklahoma, Neely lived in the house for fifteen years until his 1919 shooting death in the western United States. Five years later, the property was purchased by Sieber, a leading Lima businessman; he and his family owned the house for over fifty years. After the family sold the property in 1975, it was converted to a senior center.

== Architecture ==
Located at 620 W. Spring Street, the Neely–Sieber House is a fine example of early twentieth-century Lima residential architecture. As the home of an oil baron, it was one of many grand buildings in the city erected in the wake of the discovery of petroleum near Lima in 1885. The house's three floors are divided into twenty-six rooms, many of which are decorated with chandeliers, carven mahogany panelling, and hand-painted ceilings. Among these rooms are a grand ballroom and quarters for the household servants.

The house's exterior is dominated by a large veranda that wraps around the house's front and western sides. Brick walls are supported by a stone foundation and topped by a roof of asbestos. Above the main entrance is a broken pediment and a semi-circular transom, and three third-floor dormer windows pierce the front of the roof.

=== Similar buildings ===
Many houses similar to the Neely–Sieber House were built on Lima's west side around the turn of the twentieth century, but few remain. Some of the best examples of period residential architecture once lined West Market Street just west of the city's central square, but most of these houses were destroyed in the 1960s after rezoning; only the MacDonall House survived.

== Recognition ==
In 1976, the Neely–Sieber House was listed on the National Register of Historic Places. As one of the most elegant houses ever built in Lima, and as one of the few surviving mansions on the city's west side, it was seen as deserving of historic preservation primarily because of its historically significant architecture. Several other historic Lima houses are also listed on the National Register: the MacDonall House was added in 1978, and a group of thirty-five houses on the far western end of Market Street were designated the West Market Street Boulevard Historic District in 2004.
