= Hale Hall =

- Old Ohio Union
- U.S. National Register of Historic Places
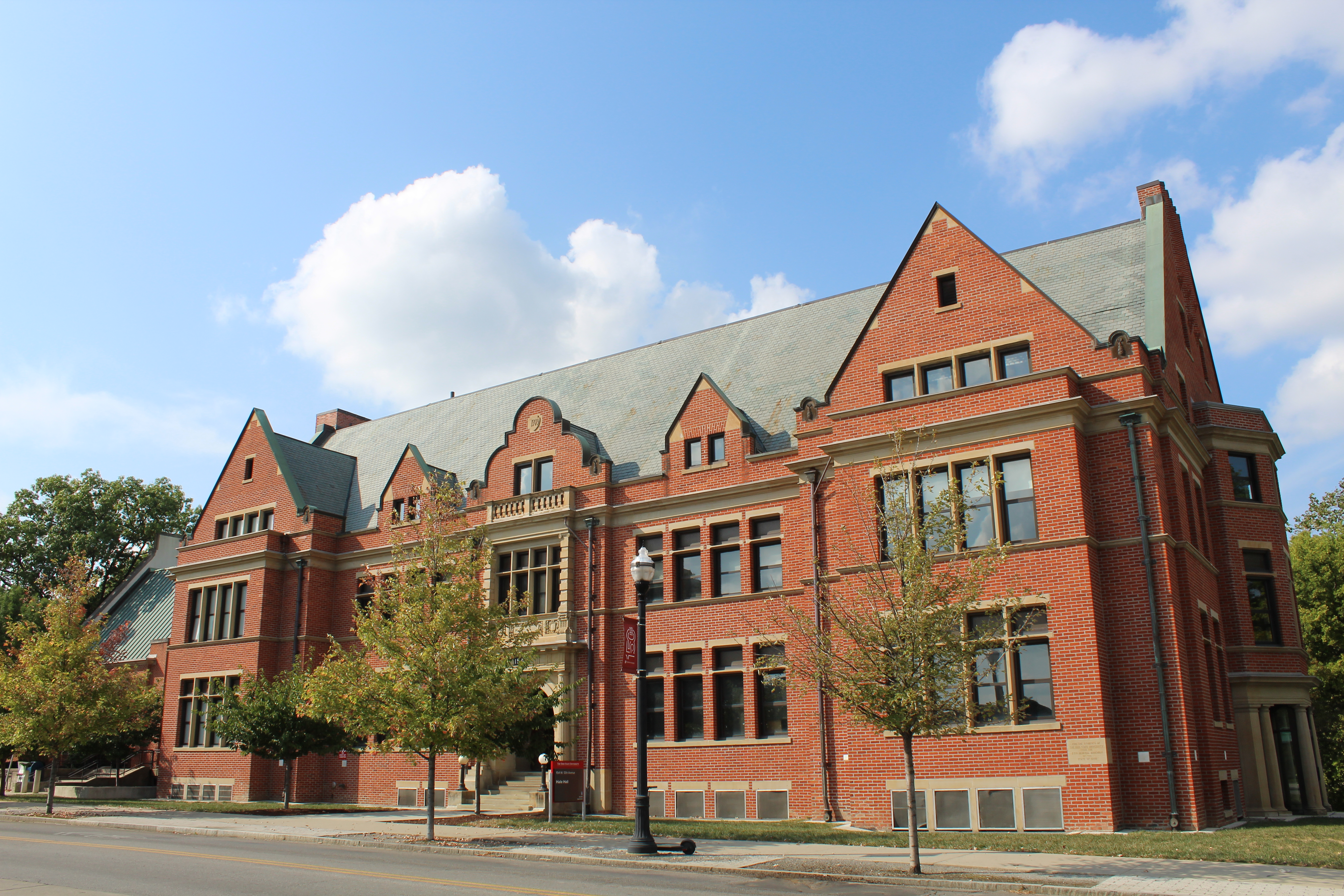
- Interactive map highlighting the building's location
- Location: 154 W. 12th Ave., Columbus, Ohio
- Coordinates: 39.996998°N 83.011791°W
- Built: 1909–1911
- Architect: George S. Mills
- Architectural style: Jacobethan Revival
- NRHP reference No.: 79001838
- Added to NRHP: April 20, 1979

Hale Hall is a historic building of the Ohio State University main campus in Columbus, Ohio. It was built in 1909–1911 and listed on the National Register of Historic Places in 1979. The building was formerly the Ohio Union, and had numerous other names through its history. It was the fourth student union building built in the U.S., and the first at a state university in the country. It is only one of four buildings on campus on the National Register; the others are the Ohio Stadium and Hayes and Orton Halls.

The building was designed by George S. Mills and built from 1909 to 1911. Although built as a student union, the building was replaced by Building 058, completed in 1951. The old building was then remodeled for student services, completed by 1953. The student health service moved out in 1969, and most of the remaining student services had moved by 1976. The property was listed on the National Register of Historic Places in 1979, despite opposition from the university's executives.

From 1989 to 2020, the building or its predecessor served as the Frank W. Hale Jr. Black Cultural Center, a student center and gathering space for Black students at the college. It was named for the former vice provost for Diversity and Inclusion and professor emeritus at Ohio State, who spent years creating opportunities for students of color while creating safe spaces for these students. The students had fought for their own space, resulting in the center's establishment. The center lost its space in 2020 during the COVID-19 pandemic and the building was converted for classroom use. Black student groups are working to have the space return to acting as a cultural center.

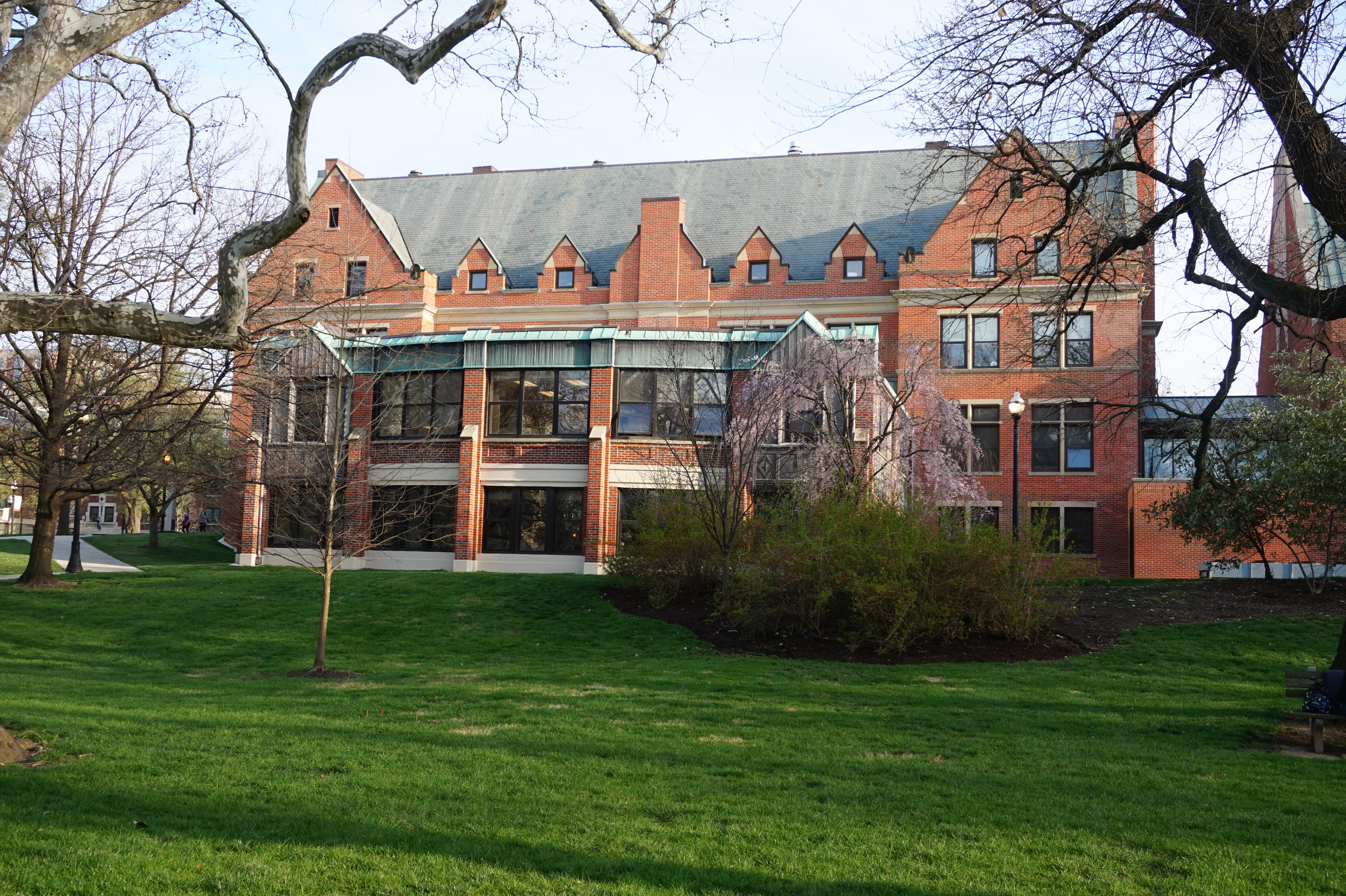
North facade

== See also ==
- National Register of Historic Places listings in Columbus, Ohio
