= Ohio Building (Toledo, Ohio) =

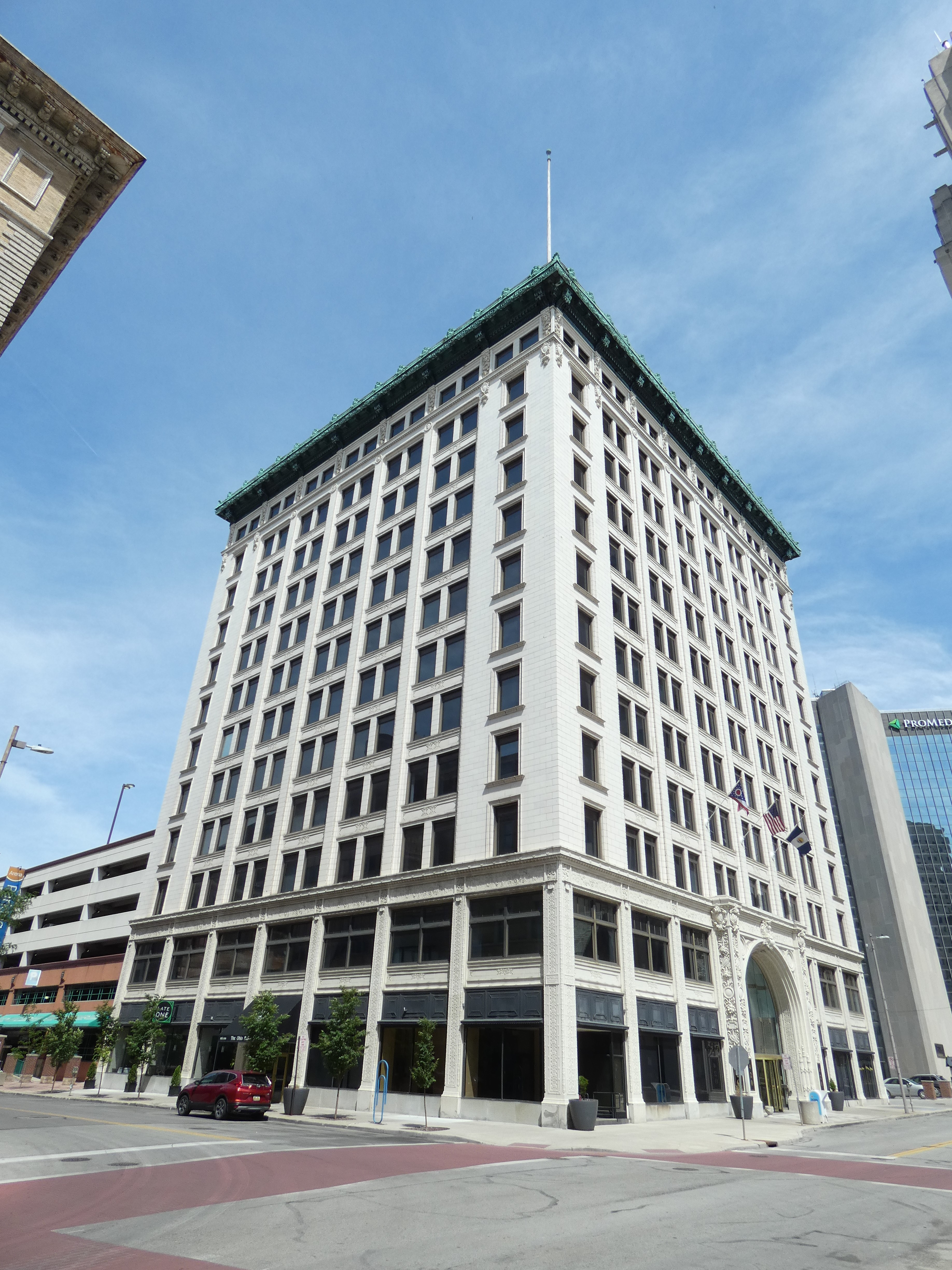
- Ohio Building in 2022

General information
- Type: office
- Location: 420 Madison Avenue, Toledo, Ohio 41°39′06.6″N 83°32′07.1″W
- Completed: 1906

Height
- Architectural: 178 ft (54 m)
- Roof: 152 ft (46 m)

Technical details
- Floor count: 12

The Ohio Building is a 178 ft (54 m) tall high-rise building located at 420 Madison Avenue in Downtown Toledo.

== History ==
The twelve story structure was constructed in 1906 by the Ohio Savings Bank and Trust Company at the corner of Madison Avenue and Superior Street in Toledo's business center. The building was described in 1910 as "one of the finest structures in the state". The building was designed by George S. Mills, who moved his architectural offices into the finished structure upon its completion.

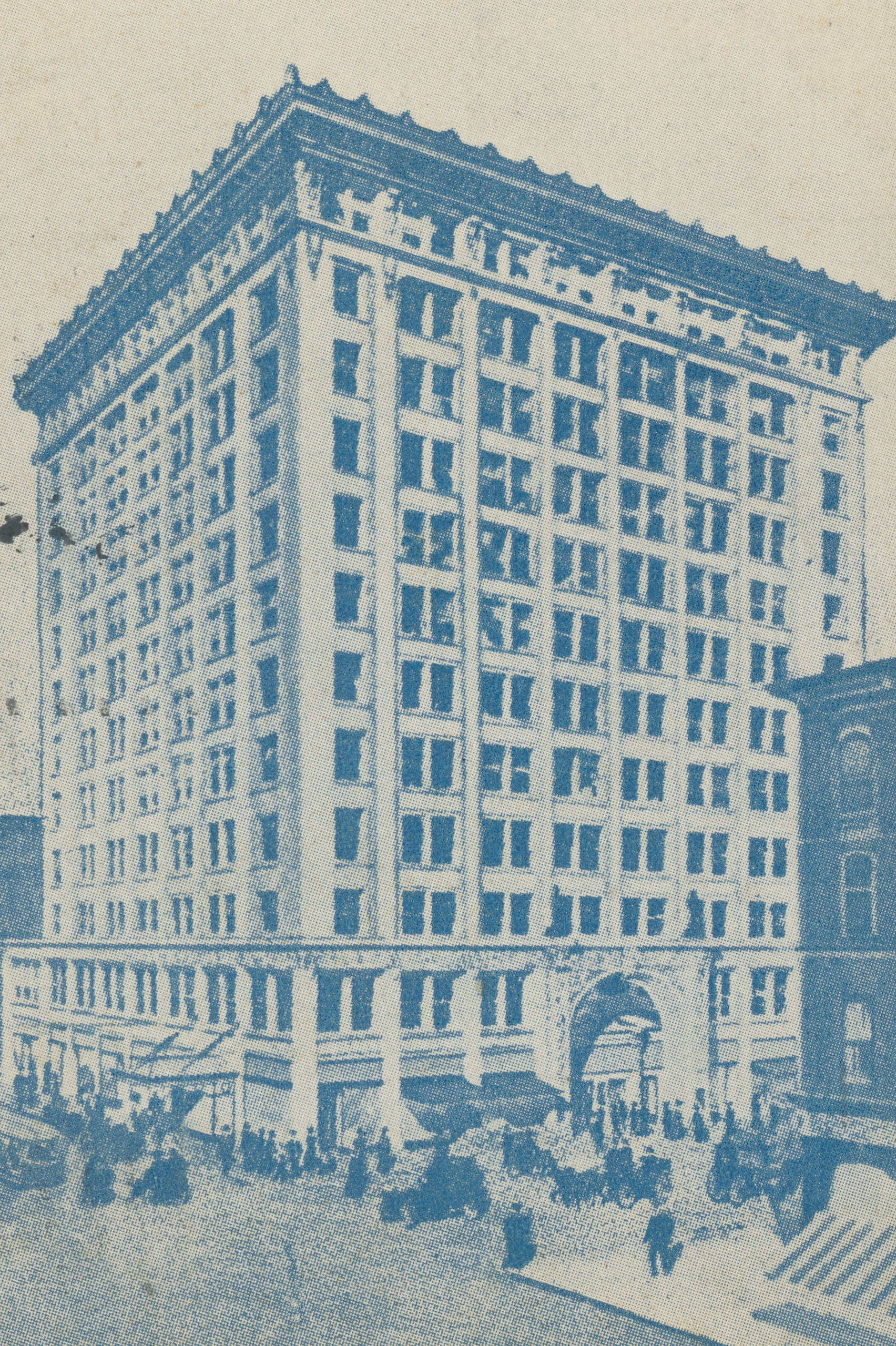
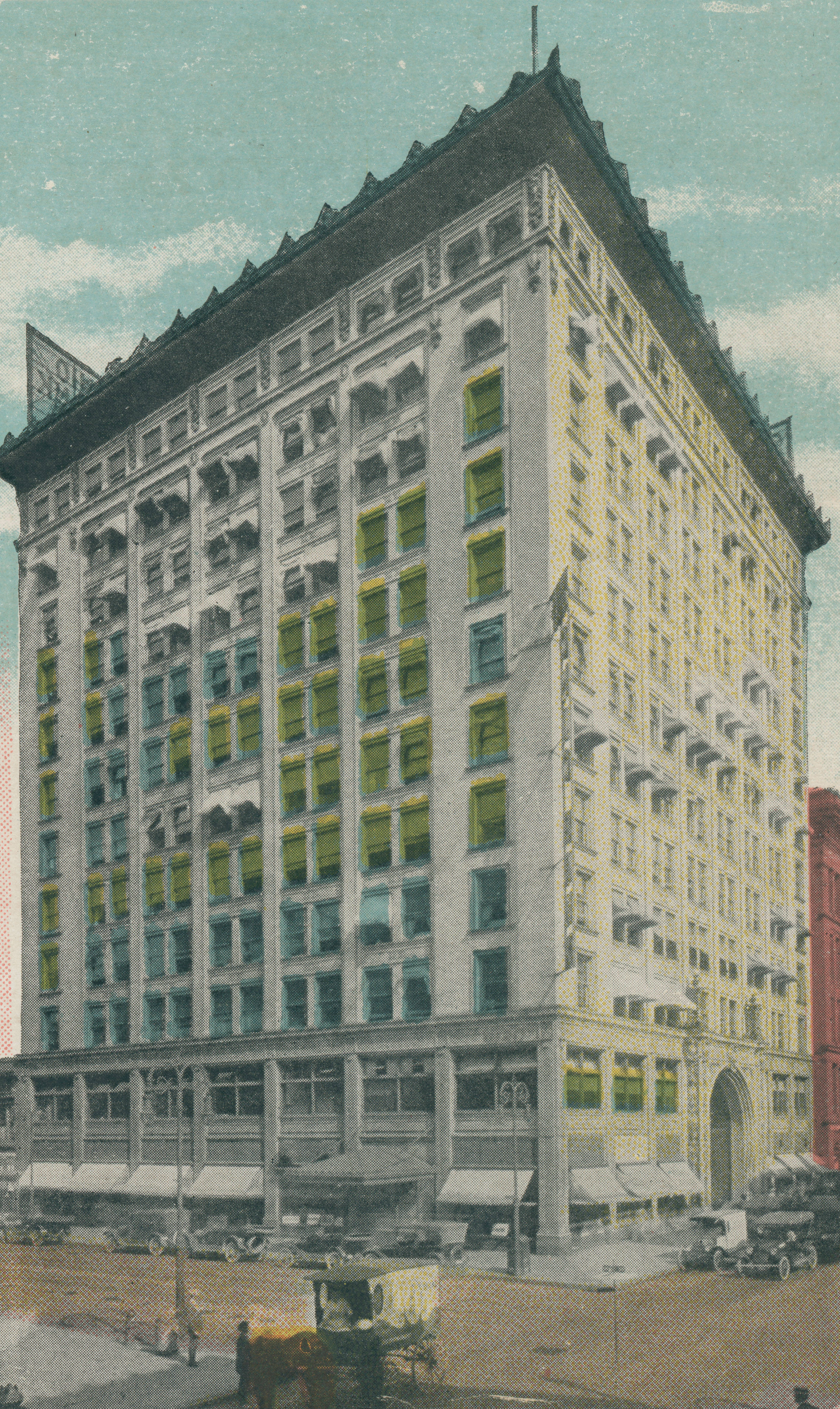
The Ohio Building in the early twentieth century

== See also ==
- List of tallest buildings in Toledo, Ohio
