= Campbell Baking Company =

- U.S. National Register of Historic Places
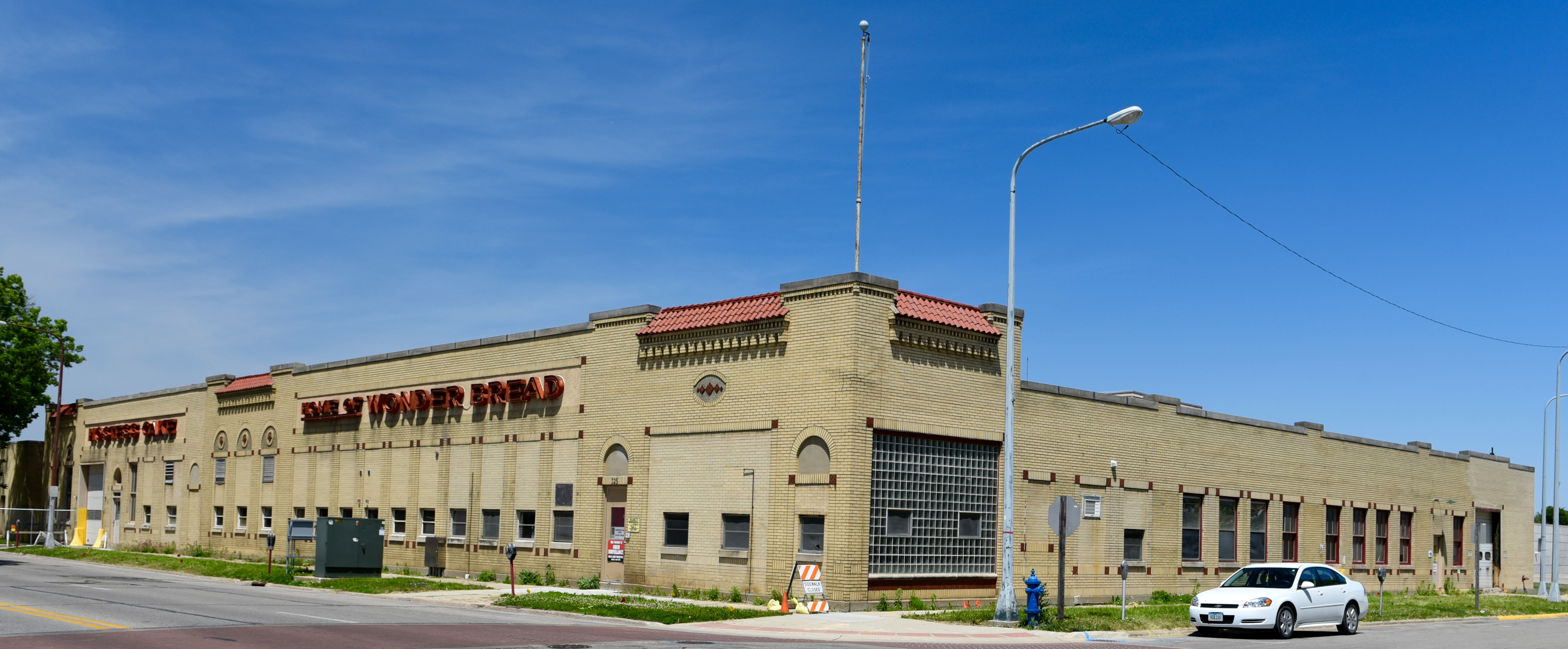

- Location within Iowa Location within the United States
- Location: 325 Commercial St. Waterloo, Iowa
- Coordinates: 42°29′49.3″N 92°20′31.5″W
- Area: less than one acre
- Built: 1927
- Built by: John G. Miller Construction Co.
- Architect: Mills, Rhines, Bellman & Nordhoff
- Architectural style: Spanish Revival
- NRHP reference No.: 16000213
- Added to NRHP: May 2, 2016

The Campbell Baking Company is a historic building located in Waterloo, Iowa, United States. Built in 1927, the single-story, yellow brick structure is basically a utilitarian building with Spanish Revival decorative elements on its primary and secondary façades. An addition from the early 1930s complements the original building, while additions from 1957 and 1977 do not. The last addition incorporated an unrelated brick building into the bakery complex. The original building was designed by the Toledo, Ohio architectural firm of Mills, Rhines, Bellman & Nordhoff, and built by the John G. Miller Construction Company. The building represents the consolidation of the bakery industry in the early 20th century from neighborhood retail bakers to local wholesalers to national industrial wholesale bakery companies. The Campbell Baking Company entered the Waterloo market as a financial backer of the Peerless Baking Company, which was formed in 1917. Campbell took over Peerless in 1921 in an older bakery building. It had become outmoded and too small for their needs, so they had this building constructed. They produce Wonder Bread and Hostess Twinkies here. The building was listed on the National Register of Historic Places in 2016.
