= Hotel Kimball =

Hotel in Springfield, Massachusetts, US

Coordinates: 42°6′18.6″N 72°35′21.1″W

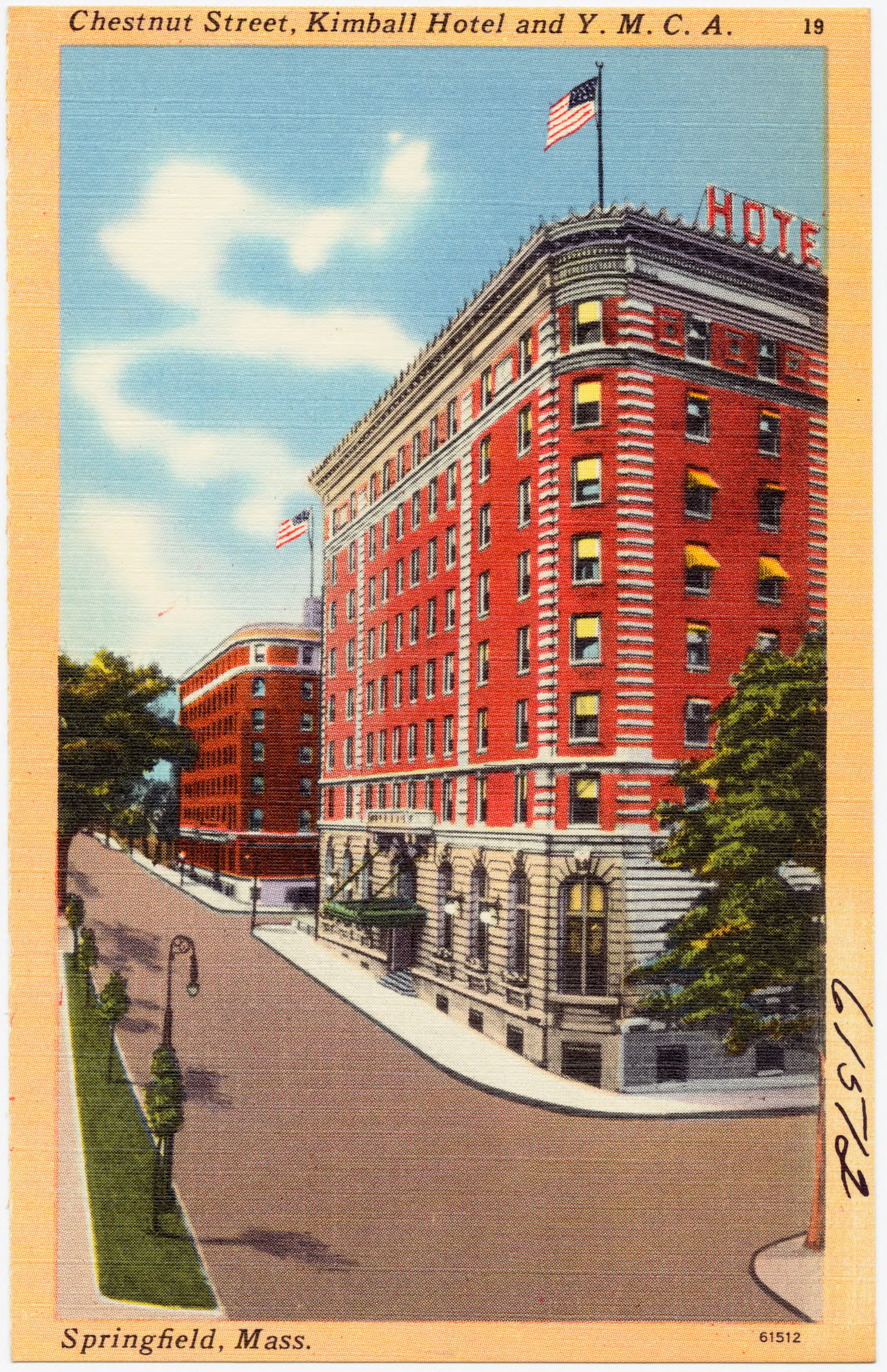
- Historic postcard: Kimball Hotel
- Interactive map of the Hotel Kimball area
- Alternative names: Kimball Towers Condominiums

General information
- Type: Hotel
- Architectural style: Renaissance Revival
- Location: 140 Chestnut Street, Springfield, Massachusetts, USA
- Construction started: 1910
- Opened: 1911
- Cost: $1,000,000

Design and construction
- Architect: Albert Winslow Cobb
- Designations: (see Designated landmark)
- Known for: Site of the United States' first-ever commercial radio station, Westinghouse's WBZ, and for hosting guests including many U.S. Presidents, dignitaries, and film stars

Other information
- Seating capacity: 450
- Number of rooms: 309

The Kimball Towers Condominiums (originally known as The Hotel Kimball and later The Sheraton-Kimball Hotel) is a historic former hotel, located in Springfield, Massachusetts, at 140 Chestnut Street, in Metro Center's Apremont Triangle Historic District. Designed by architect Albert Winslow Cobb in 1910 and constructed in the Renaissance Revival style, The Hotel Kimball is famous as the site of the United States' first-ever commercial radio station, Westinghouse's WBZ, and also for hosting celebrated guests, including many U.S. Presidents, dignitaries, and film stars. The Kimball is located in the Apremont Triangle Historic District, with its main entrance on Chestnut Street, between Bridge and Hillman Streets. Since 1983, the Kimball has been protected by the Apremont Triangle Historic District, which is on the National Register of Historic Places.

== History ==
During the first decade of the twentieth century, Springfield—at the time one of the United States' wealthiest cities—had a surfeit of wealthy travelers but only one first-class hotel (i.e., the Hotel Worthy, constructed in the nineteenth century). In 1910, wealthy businessman William Kimball commissioned architect Albert Winslow Cobb—notable for his advocacy of Shingle style architecture—to design a luxury hotel in the style of Cobb's admirers, McKim, Mead, and White, atop one of Springfield's prominent bluffs.

On its opening in 1911, the Springfield Republican described Kimball's and Cobb's building as "representing an outlay of approximately $1,000,000, the Kimball stands as an example of all the latest ideas in hotel evolution. … Everywhere there is splendor, yet it is splendor with refinement."

Cobb's exterior design for the Hotel Kimball included a rusticated stone base; arched window openings with stone voussoirs; vertical stone banding; and a detailed cornice profile. The interior featured grand function rooms, including a ballroom and lounge, as well as ample guest accommodations. On its opening in 1911, it was reviewed by the New York Times as "ranking with the finest [hotels] in the country. A magnificent hotel, modern and metropolitan in every appointment."

At the time, guest rooms featured "solid mahogany floors and chairs with upholstery of hand tooled leather, bearing the Kimball coat-of-arms." Built in what was the affluent residential neighborhood of Chestnut and Bridge Streets, the Kimball offered 309 rooms, a dining room capacity for 450, a 22-foot (6.7 m)-high grand ballroom for 350 guests, and, in 1912, room rates from "$1.50 to $3.50 per day". Proms, wedding receptions, conventions, banquets, and weekly Rotary and Kiwanis meetings kept Kimball facilities fully booked for decades.

For decades following its 1911 opening, The Kimball was "the leading hotel in Western Massachusetts." During the 1940s, it was the first grand hotel purchased by Sheraton Hotels and Resorts (which was then based in Springfield). After its purchase, the Kimball was renamed the Sheraton-Kimball Hotel and remained a 4-star property until the early 1980s, when it began a long conversion into The Kimball Towers Condominiums. In its time as a hotel, the Kimball hosted U.S. Presidents like Calvin Coolidge, Franklin D. Roosevelt, Dwight D. Eisenhower and John F. Kennedy, among many movie actors, actresses, kings, and wealthy industrialists.

During the late 1960s, the construction of Interstate 91 and the resulting white flight of wealthy and upper-middle-class Springfielders to Western Massachusetts' suburbs had a detrimental effect on the city's Metro Center and the Sheraton-Kimball Hotel, as it did on most U.S. cities and their urban hotels. During the 1970s and early 1980s, many Gilded Age hotels like the Kimball were torn down in the United States. In 1983, the Kimball was spared the wrecking ball by the National Register of Historic Places. Soon after, two developers purchased it to develop condominiums. Amid the renovation of the 309-room Hotel Kimball into the 132-room Kimball Towers, its developers filed for bankruptcy. Later they were imprisoned for a different development. For nearly a decade thereafter, the Kimball Towers were managed by the Federal Deposit Insurance Corporation. Many of the Kimball's units were left unfinished or bare by the developers, who had completed only the top three floors of the ten-story building (floors 6, 7, and 8). During this period, many Kimball units were sold to absentee landlords, as the building's (and Springfield's) future seemed uncertain.

During the new millennium, the Kimball staged a comeback. It achieved financial and managerial stability, which had eluded it since its days as the Sheraton-Kimball Hotel. The "Millennium Room"—originally part of the Kimball's famous Pickwick Lounge restaurant and bar, which played host to numerous Kennedy family campaign meetings—was renovated and now features regular art shows and entertainment by artists and musicians. In 2011, the Kimball celebrated its 100th anniversary on St. Patrick's Day, 2011. As of 2012, the Kimball Towers is primarily owner-occupied, and currently undergoing extensive renovations in accordance with its Historic Preservation Certificate.

=== Westinghouse's WBZ ===
The Kimball is famous as the site of one of the United States' first-ever commercial radio stations, Westinghouse's WBZ. From 1921 until the station moved to Boston, Massachusetts in the 1930s, WBZ's standard broadcast identification was "WBZ-AM, Hotel Kimball, Springfield" and later "WBZA-AM & FM, Hotel Kimball, Springfield." The radio station's headquarters in the Hotel Kimball lured the day's most popular entertainers to Springfield—a mid-sized city, although from the 1870s–1960s also one of the United States' wealthiest. These entertainers were drawn by the hotel's reputation as much as the radio station's, and Springfield's.
