= Apremont Triangle Historic District =

Historic district in Massachusetts, United States

- U.S. National Register of Historic Places
- U.S. Historic district
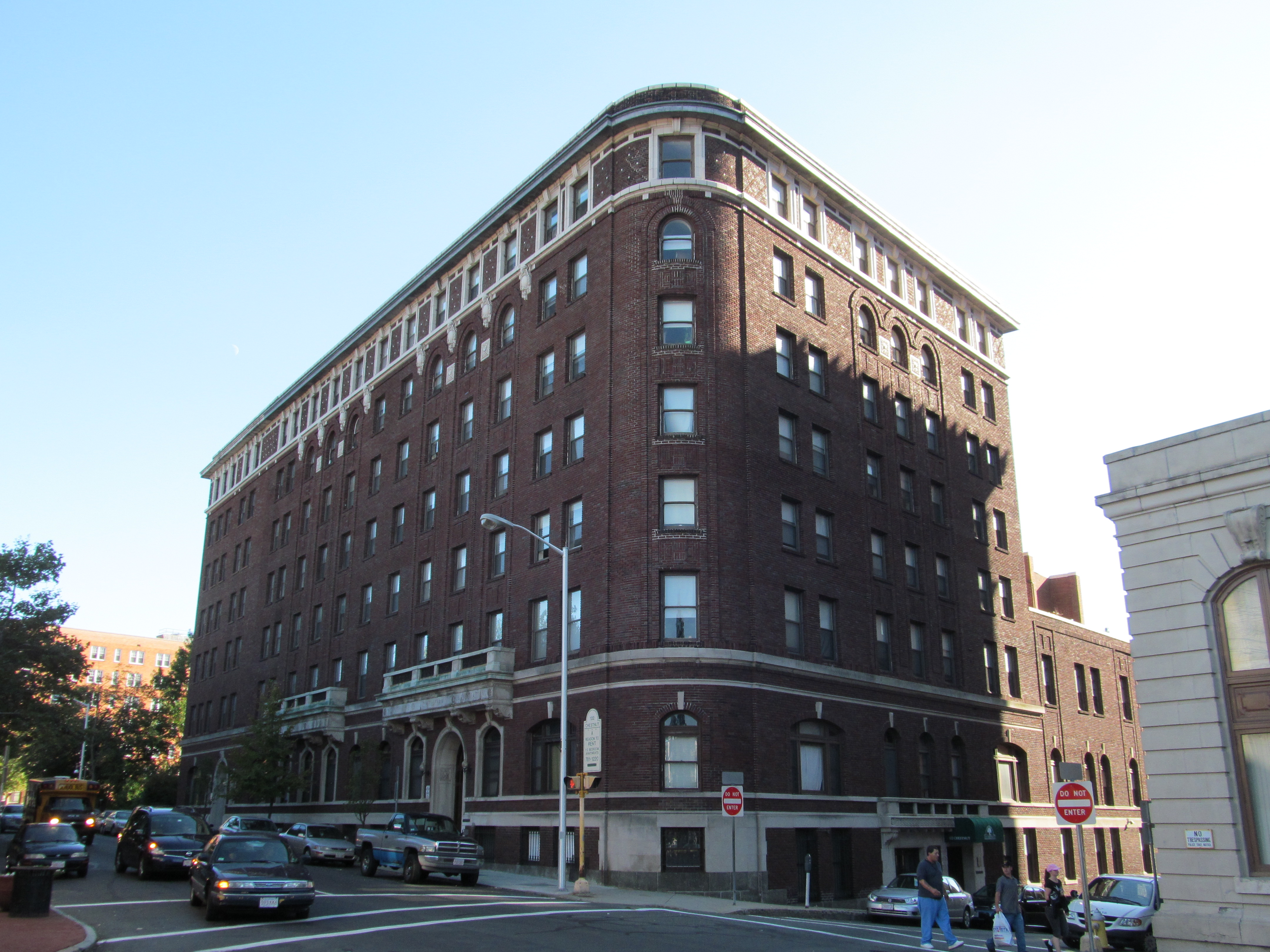
- Young Men's Christian Association

- Location within Massachusetts Location within the United States
- Location: Springfield, Massachusetts
- Coordinates: 42°6′19″N 72°35′21″W
- Built: 1910
- Architect: Multiple
- Architectural style: Late 19th and Early 20th Century Revivals, Modern Movement, Romanesque
- MPS: Metro Center Springfield MRA
- NRHP reference No.: 83000735
- Added to NRHP: May 27, 1983

Apremont Triangle Historic District is a historic district in Springfield, Massachusetts, located at the junction of Pearl, Hillman, Bridge, and Chestnut Streets in its Metro Center district. The Apremont Triangle Historic District includes the Apremont Triangle Park, nicknamed "the Heart of Springfield" by the city's arts community; the historic, 10-story Kimball Towers Condominiums, (formerly the luxurious Hotel Kimball - "Western Massachusetts' Leading Hotel - built in 1910;) a nine-story historic, former YMCA, which now houses apartments at 122 Chestnut Street, (1915); the six-story Neo-Gothic Tarbell-Waters Building (1923), a former office building that was auctioned in August 2011; the two-story Harris-Green building, a 1920s Rolls-Royce showroom, which is, actually, two buildings; and the two-story Birnie Building, a 1930s Pontiac showroom. Currently, the district is the center of Springfield's bohemian arts community, featuring multi-media organizations, artists' lofts, ethnic restaurants, and organizations like The Apremont Arts Community - group of multi-media artists, non-profit organizations, and businesses.

Located in a walkable area, the Apremont Triangle Historic District is less than half a mile from Springfield's Club Quarter, its Downtown Business District, Union Station, the Quadrangle, the MassMutual Center, Symphony Hall, the Springfield Armory, and numerous other sites.

== 2011 sales of 122 Chestnut and the Tarbell-Waters Building ==
As of June 2011, the Renaissance Revival 122 Chestnut - the former YMCA building that was, during the 1980s, adaptively re-used to become 99 rental apartments - and the Neo-Gothic Tarbell-Waters Buildings are both for sale. These are two of the five properties that constitute the Apremont Triangle Historic District. The buyer of these properties could substantially change the character of the Apremont Triangle Historic District, which in recent years has flourished as an increasingly bohemian arts district. The asking price for 122 Chestnut is 6.5 million, including an attached 144 car parking lot. Residents of the Apremont Triangle Historic District look at dual building sales with both caution and optimism, because in recent years, the neighborhood has had great success in attracting artistic and bohemian residents to the Kimball Towers, 122 Chestnut, the Birnie Building, and the McIntosh - an adaptively re-purposed shoe factory on Worthington Street. However, precisely because the neighborhood has been on an upward trajectory for years; the sale of two of the district's most important buildings are temporarily, in 2011, depressing market values at the Kimball and McIntosh, reflected in 1 bedroom units selling in the $30,000s-$80,000s.

== Apremont Triangle Park ==
The Apremont Triangle Park was named after Springfield's 104th Infantry - the first U.S. military regiment ever honored by a foreign power for bravery in war. Following the 104th Infantry's valor at Apremont during World War I, it received the Croix de Guerre from the Nation of France. The Apremont Triangle Park is named in honor of the U.S. 104th Infantry Regiment's heroism at Apremont. In the park, there is monument to the 104th Infantry, Springfield's own, noting its heroism at Apremont. Amazingly, again in World War II, the 104th Infantry Regiment again received the prestigious Croix de Guerre for its valor at war. In World War II, the 104th Infantry fought under General George Patton and in the Battle of the Bulge.

== Kimball Towers Condominiums ==
The Hotel Kimball was once "Western Massachusetts finest hotel." Built in 1910, and opened on St. Patrick's Day, 1911, the New York Times reviewed the Hotel Kimball as "ranking with the finest [hotels] in the country. A magnificent hotel, modern and metropolitan in every appointment." In 1920 it hosted the United States' first-ever commercial radio station - WBZ, Springfield. U.S. Presidents Franklin D. Roosevelt, Dwight D. Eisenhower, and John F. Kennedy all stayed at The Kimball - some before and some after the 1940s transition into the Sheraton-Kimball Hotel, operated by Sheraton Hotels and Resorts. The Kimball was the first "grand hotel" purchased by Sheraton, a company that was, at the time, headquartered in Springfield.

Today, the Hotel Kimball is the Kimball Towers Condominiums. During the 1980s, when the building's condo developer was converting over 300 hotel rooms to approximately 120 condominiums, he filed for bankruptcy. Many of the Kimball's units, (especially those on the lower floors,) were left in disrepair or completely bare.

From the 1990s until the 2000s, the building was managed by the Federal Deposit Insurance Corporation because - due to it historic designation - it could not be torn down. In the 2000s, urban living in Metro Center Springfield became popular, especially among bohemians, artists, empty-nesters, and LGBT residents - people attracted to urban living without the high price. The Kimball Towers, due to its low-prices (from its formerly troubled history as a condominium development) and essentially 'blank canvas' left by the initial condominium developer, became a center for Springfield's arts community. As of 2011, it is one of Springfield's most prominent buildings for artists, bohemians, and others in the creative class.

== See also ==
- National Register of Historic Places listings in Springfield, Massachusetts
- National Register of Historic Places listings in Hampden County, Massachusetts
