= Forest Park Highlands =

Amusement park in Missouri

Coordinates: 38.629°N 90.279°W

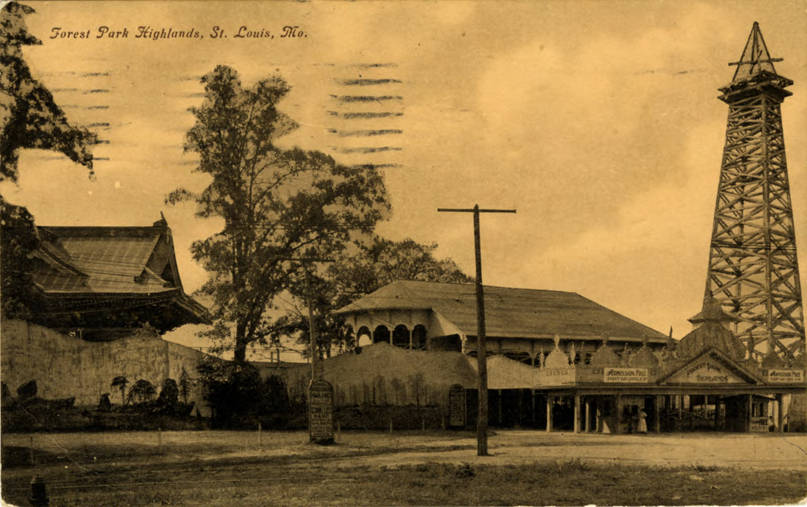
Forest Park Highlands, c. 1909

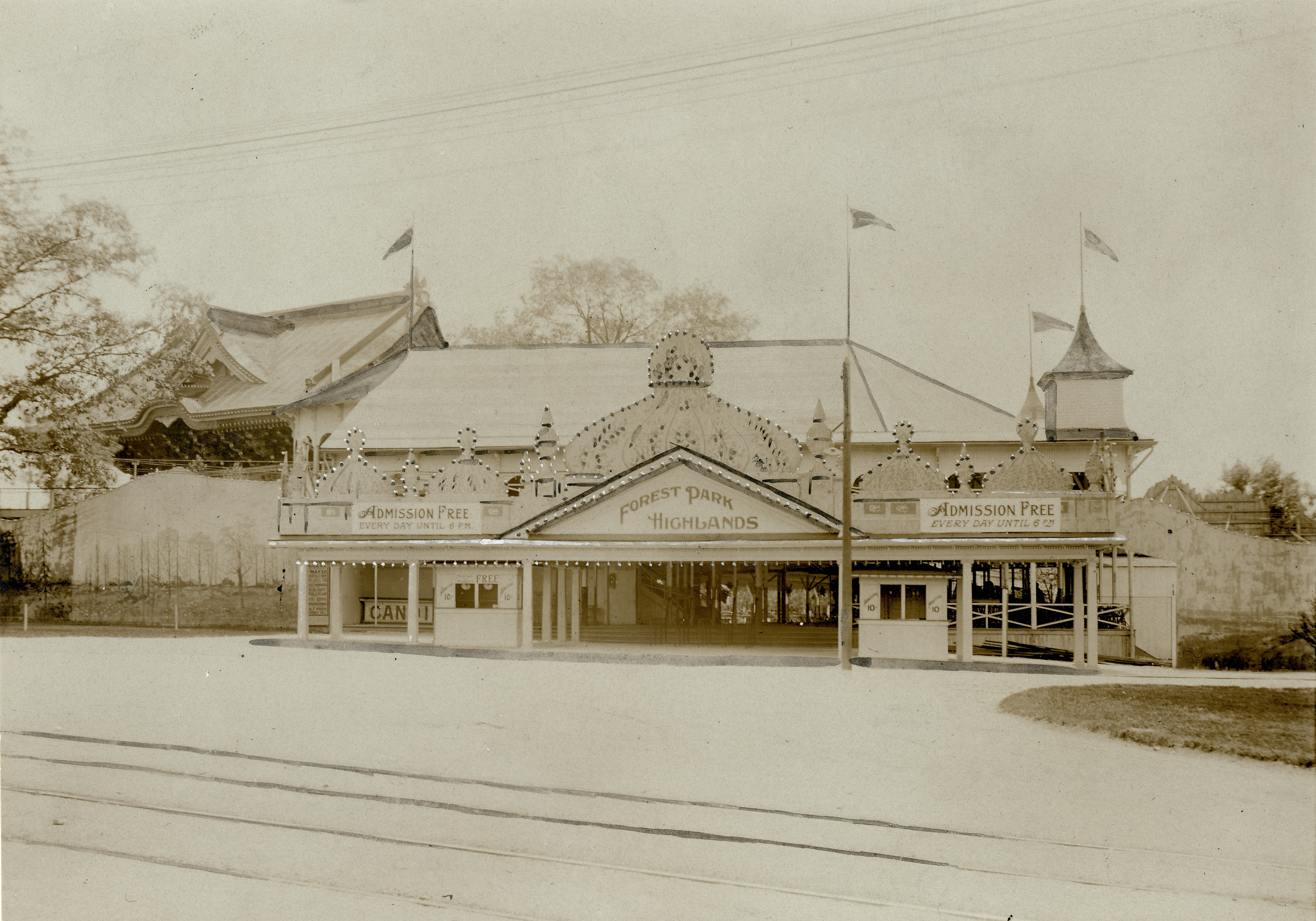
Forest Park Highlands, 1910

Forest Park Highlands was an American amusement park in St. Louis, Missouri. It operated from 1896 to 1963.

Forest Park Highlands opened in 1896 as a beer garden.

Sophie Tucker, John Philip Sousa, and Jack Dempsey appeared there.

It featured a pagoda from the 1904 World's Fair held across the street in Forest Park. It also had a ferris wheel, railway, dodgem cars, tiltawhirls, shooting galleries, doll throws, and wheels of chance.

By 1963, the park was struggling and there was interest in building a community college on the site. A fire on July 19, 1963, destroyed all but the swimming pool and the frame of the wooden roller coaster. Two years later, it was announced that St. Louis Community College–Forest Park would be built on the land.

The park's 1920 Dentzel carousel survived the fire and operates today at Faust Park in Chesterfield, Missouri.
