= Coproduction Office =

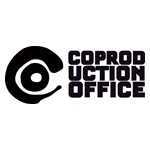
- Company's logo
- Industry: Motion Pictures (production and sales)
- Founded: 1987
- Founder: Philippe Bober
- Divisions: Production: Paris, Berlin, London, Copenhagen International Sales Paris, Berlin
- Website: coproductionoffice.eu

Coproduction Office, founded in 1987, is composed of four production divisions in Berlin, Paris, Copenhagen and London, and an international sales company, all specialised in Auteur Cinema. Coproduction Office’s founder Philippe Bober has produced forty films to date with twelve of these having been selected to screen in Competition in Cannes, winning two Golden Palms: Triangle of Sadness and The Square both by Ruben Östlund.

Over the last two decades, it has mainly produced and handled films by Ulrich Seidl, Jessica Hausner, Roy Andersson, Michelangelo Frammartino, Kornél Mundruczó, Ilya Khrzhanovsky, Carlos Reygadas, Ruben Östlund, and has also sold films by, among others, Gust Van den Berghe, Takashi Miike, Antonio Campos, Cristi Puiu, Corneliu Porumboiu, and Thomas Clay.

Coproduction Office handles the international distribution of its films as well as a selection of other films, such as the restored works of Roberto Rossellini.

== History ==
Founded in 1987 by Philippe Bober, the company was named after its efforts to raise funds for Europa by Lars von Trier (winner of the Jury Prize at Cannes in 1991). Europa was a four-country coproduction supported by Eurimages during its very first session in 1989 for which Bober acted as associate producer for Germany and France. For von Trier's following project, The Kingdom, Coproduction Office was involved both as German co-producer and international sales agent, closing deals in territories where the four-hour-long television series was distributed theatrically (by October Films in the U.S.; ICA Projects in the United Kingdom; Haut et Cour in France; Shochiku in Japan, Key Films in Italy; Essential Films in Germany - the then newly created, Berlin-based production arm of Coproduction Office). Coproduction Office then went on to produce Breaking The Waves for the joint production venture Libérator Productions with Zentropa in 1999, and has established ongoing relationships with Scandinavian directors; Roy Andersson, Dagur Kári, producing the film Nói Albinói together with Iceland's Zik Zak Filmworks, as well as Ruben Östlund.

Coproduction Office expanded its production activities adding production divisions in Paris in 2000, in Copenhagen in 2007, and in London in 2020. Coproduction Office and the Sarajevo Film Festival have cooperated since 1995 with Philippe Bober being artistic director and thereafter programmer of the new currents section. "Having freedom of choice has always been an obsession of mine," notes Bober, highlighting that he "also spent three months per year for over 15 years viewing films, going to festivals, looking for information about directors: focusing on a few films is a deliberate choice and the result of this work." It is thanks to his role at the Sarajevo Festival that Philippe Bober invited Roy Andersson’s short films Something Happened (1987) and World of Glory (1991), as well as Jessica Hausner’s graduation film Inter-View (1999), Ulrich Seidl’s film Models (1999) and Ruben Östlund’s short film Autobiographical Scene Number 6882 (2005), subsequently establishing long working relationships with all four directors. “In the end, I’m loyal to auteurs” comments Philippe Bober, “I’ve been working with Michelangelo Frammartino since 2003, with Jessica Hausner and Ulrich Seidl since 1999, and with Roy Andersson since 1996. The auteurs and the company grow together."

== Film Library ==
The films produced or sold by Coproduction Office mostly premiered in Cannes (with 12 nominations in the official Competition, 8 first features and 13 awards across sections), Venice (with 6 nominations in the official Competition, 5 first features and 8 awards across sections) and Berlin (4 nominations in Competition). 21 of these Competition titles were produced or co-produced by Philippe Bober.

== Awards ==
- Cannes Film Festival
  - 2022: Palme d'Or for Triangle of Sadness by Ruben Östlund
  - 2019: Prix d'interprétation féminine – Best Actress for Little Joe by Jessica Hausner
  - 2017: Palme d'Or for The Square by Ruben Östlund
  - 2014: Jury Prize Un Certain Regard for Force Majeure by Ruben Östlund
  - 2008: Fipresci Award for Delta by Kornél Mundruczó
  - 2006: Camera d'Or and Prix Europa Cinema for 12:08 East of Bucharest by Corneliu Porumboiu
  - 2005: Prize Un Certain Regard Award for The Death of Mr. Lazarescu by Cristi Puiu
  - 2002: Camera d'Or Special Mention for Japón by Carlos Reygadas
  - 2000: Jury Prize for Songs from the Second Floor by Roy Andersson
  - 1999: Cinéfondation Award - Special Mention for Inter-view by Jessica Hausner
  - 1996: Grand Prix for Breaking the Waves by Lars Von Trier
  - 1992: Jury Prize for Europa by Lars von Trier
- Mostra Internazionale del Cinema di Venezia
  - 2019: Silver Lion for About Endlessness by Roy Andersson
  - 2014: Golden Lion for A Pigeon Sat on a Branch Reflecting on Existence by Roy Andersson
  - 2012: Jury Prize for Paradise: Faith by Ulrich Seidl
  - 2009: Fipresci Award, Signis Award, Premio La Navicella and Brian Award for Lourdes by Jessica Hausner
  - 2009: Silver Lion for Women Without Men by Shirin Neshat
  - 2001: Grand Prix for Dog Days by Ulrich Seidl
- Berlin International Film Festival
  - 2020: Silver Bear for Outstanding Artistic Contribution for DAU.Natasha by Ilya Khrzhanovsky and Jekaterina Oertel
- Other main prizes:
  - 2015: Special Jury Award at South by Southwest for Creative Control by Benjamin Dickinson
  - 2010: Label Europa Cinemas for Le Quattro Volte by Michelangelo Frammartino
  - 2005: Tiger Award for 4 by Ilya Khrzhanovsky
  - 2002: Silver Leopard for Pleasant Days by Kornél Mundruczó
  - 2000: Tiger Award for Suzhou River by Lou Ye
  - 1999: Sarajevo Audience Award for Models by Ulrich Seidl
  - 1996: 6 Robert Awards for The Kingdom by Lars von Trier
  - 1990: Wiener Film Prize for Good News by Ulrich Seidl

== The Rossellini Project ==
In collaboration with Istituto Luce, Cineteca di Bologna and CSC Cineteca Nazionale, Coproduction Office undertakes the restoration and promotion of ten key films of Roberto Rossellini’s filmography:

- Rome, Open City (1945)
- Paisan (1946)
- Amore (1948)
- Germany, Year Zero (1948)
- Stromboli (1950)
- Machine to Kill Bad People (1952)
- Fear (1954)
- Journey to Italy (1954)
- India: Matri Bhumi (1959)
- Intervista a Salvador Allende: La forza e la ragione (1971)
- Anno Uno (1974)

== Coproduction Office Classics and Restoration ==
Coproduction Office is active in restoring its films, and whenever possible, working closely with the directors.

In 2021, director Lou Ye supervised the Coproduction Office restoration of his film Suzhou River (2000), working from the original 16mm A-B negative of the image. The restored classic has been presented at Berlinale Classics 2022. Carlos Reygadas’ Battle in Heaven has been newly restored from the original negative, in full 4K resolution and with Dolby Atmos sound, this process was entirely supervised by the director. Of Reygadas’ titles Japòn, has been restored in 2K, as well as Post Tenebras Lux. Coproduction Office’s restoration efforts also extend to the Rossellini Collection.

Restoration of Dagur Kari and Jessica Hausner’s films is in process.

== Filmography ==
| Year | Format | Director | Original title | International title | Activity | Festival |
|---|---|---|---|---|---|---|
| 2022 | Feature | Jessica Hausner | Club Zero | Club Zero | Producer (Germany, France), International Sales | In Post-Production |
| 2022 | Feature | Ulrich Seidl | BÖSE SPIELE Rimini Sparta | WICKED GAMES Rimini Sparta | Producer (Germany, France), International Sales | International Film Festival Rotterdam (IFFR) |
| 2022 | Feature | Ulrich Seidl | Sparta (film) | Sparta | Producer (Germany, France), International Sales | San Sebastián Film Festival - In Competition - European Premiere |
| 2022 | Feature | Ulrich Seidl | Rimini (film) | Rimini | Producer (Germany, France), International Sales | Berlinale 2022 - Competition |
| 2022 | Feature | Ruben Östlund | Triangle of Sadness | Triangle of Sadness | Producer (Germany, France), International Sales | Cannes 2022 - Competition, Palme d'Or |
| 2021 | Feature | Michelangelo Frammartino | Il Buco | Il Buco | Producer (Germany, France), International Sales | Venice 2021 - Competition - Special Jury Prize |
| 2020 | Feature | Ilya Khrzhanovskiy, Jekaterina Oertel | DAU. Degeneratsia | DAU. Degeneration | Producer (Germany, France), International Sales | Berlinale 2020 - Berlinale Special |
| 2020 | Feature | Ilya Khrzhanovskiy, Jekaterina Oertel | DAU. Natasha | DAU. Natasha | Producer (Germany, France), International Sales | Berlinale 2020 - Official Competition |
| 2019 | Feature | Thomas Clay | Fanny Lye Deliver'd | Fanny Lye Deliver'd | Producer (Germany), International Sales | London Film Festival - Official Competition |
| 2019 | Feature | Roy Andersson | Om det oändliga | About Endlessness | Producer (Germany), International sales | Venice 2019 - Competition - Silver Lion for Best Director |
| 2019 | Feature | Jessica Hausner | Little Joe | Little Joe | Producer (Germany), International sales | Cannes 2019 - Competition - Prix d'interprétation féminine – Best Actress |
| 2019 | Feature | Susanne Heinrich | Das Melancholisches Mädchen | Aren't You Happy? | Producer (Germany), International Sales | Max Ophüls Preis 2019 - Best Film, Prize of the Ecumenical Jury |
| 2017 | Feature | Ruben Östlund | The Square | The Square | Producer (France, Germany, Denmark), International sales | Cannes 2017 - Competition - Palme d'Or |
| 2016 | Feature | Ulrich Seidl | Safari | Safari | International sales | Venice 2016 - Out of Competition |
| 2015 | Feature | Benjamin Dickinson | Creative Control | Creative Control | International sales | South by Southwest 2015 - Special Jury Award |
| 2014 | Feature | Roy Andersson | En duva satt på en gren och funderade på tillvaron | A Pigeon Sat on a Branch Reflecting on the Existence | Producer (France, Germany), International sales | Venice 2014 - Competition - Golden Lion |
| 2014 | Feature | Jessica Hausner | Amour Fou | Amour Fou | Producer (Germany), International sales | Cannes 2014 - Un certain regard |
| 2014 | Feature | Jonathan Nossiter | Résistance naturelle | Natural Resistance | International Sales | Berlin 2014 - Panorama |
| 2014 | Feature | Ruben Östlund | Turist | Force Majeure | Producer (France, Denmark), International sales | Cannes 2014 - Un certain regard Jury Prize |
| 2014 | Feature | Ulrich Seidl | Im Keller | In the Basement | International sales | Venice 2014 - Out of Competition |
| 2014 | Feature | Shin’ya Tsukamoto | Nobi | Fires on the Plain | International sales | Venice 2014 - Competition |
| 2013 | Series | Stéphane Aubier Vincent Patar | La Bûche de Noël | A Town Called Panic: The Christmas Log | International sales | New York International's Children Film Festival - Grand Prix and Audience Award |
| 2013 | Installation | Michelangelo Frammartino | Alberi | Alberi | Producer (Germany), International sales | MoMA PS1 2013 |
| 2013 | Feature | Ulrich Seidl | Paradies: Hoffnung | Paradise: Hope | Producer (France), International sales | Berlin 2013 - Competition |
| 2012 | Feature | Ulrich Seidl | Paradies: Glaube | Paradise: Faith | Producer (France), International sales | Venice 2012 - Competition - Jury Award |
| 2012 | Feature | Ulrich Seidl | Paradies: Liebe | Paradise: Love | Producer (France), International sales | Cannes 2012 - Competition |
| 2012 | Feature | Spiros Stathoulopoulos | Meteora | Meteora | Producer (Germany), International sales | Berlin 2012 - Competition |
| 2011 | Feature | Gust Van den Berghe | Blue Bird | Blue Bird | International sales | Cannes 2011 - Quinzaine des réalisateurs |
| 2011 | Feature | Ruben Östlund | Play | Play | Producer (France, Denmark), International sales | Cannes 2011 - Quinzaine des réalisateurs |
| 2011 | Short | Bertrand Mandico | Boro in the Box | Boro in the Box | Producer (France), International sales | Cannes 2011 - Quinzaine des réalisateurs |
| 2010 | Short | Bertrand Mandico | Líf og dauði Henrys Darger | The Life and Death of Henry Darger | Producer (France), International Sales | Venice 2010 - Orizzonti |
| 2010 | Feature | Gust Van den Berghe | En waar de sterre bleef stille staan | Little Baby Jesus of Flandr | International sales | Cannes 2010 - Quinzaine des réalisateurs |
| 2010 | Feature | Kornél Mundruczó | Szelíd teremtés: A Frankenstein-terv | Tender Son - The Frankenstein Project | Producer (Germany), International sales | Cannes 2010 - Competition |
| 2010 | Feature | Michelangelo Frammartino | Le Quattro Volte | Le Quattro Volte | Producer (Germany), International sales | Cannes 2010 - Quinzaine des réalisateurs - Label Europa Cinemas |
| 2010 | Feature | Cristi Puiu | Aurora | Aurora | Producer (France, Germany), International sales | Cannes 2010 - Un certain regard |
| 2009 | Feature | Stéphane Aubier Vincent Patar | A Town Called Panic | Panique au village | International sales | Cannes 2009 - Out of Competition |
| 2009 | Feature | Jessica Hausner | Lourdes | Lourdes | Producer (France, Germany), International sales | Venice 2009 - Competition - Fipresci Award |
| 2009 | Feature | Shirin Neshat | Zanan-e bedun-e mardan | Women Without Men | Producer (France, Germany), International sales | Venice 2009 - Competition - Silver Lion |
| 2009 | Shorts collection | Various artists | Dirty Diaries | Dirty Diaries | International sales | Thessaloniki 2011 - Open Horizons |
| 2009 | Feature | Shin’ya Tsukamoto | Tetsuo: The Bullet Man | Tetsuo: The Bullet Man | International sales | Venice 2009 - Competition |
| 2009 | Feature | Gaspar Noé | Enter the Void | Enter the Void | Co-Producer (Germany) | Cannes 2009 - Competition |
| 2008 | Feature | Thomas Clay | Soi Cowboy | Soi Cowboy | International sales | Cannes 2008 - Un certain regard |
| 2008 | Feature | Kornél Mundruczó | Delta | Delta | Producer (France, Germany), International sales | Cannes 2008 - Competition - Fipresci Award |
| 2008 | Feature | Ruben Östlund | De ofrivilliga | Involuntary | Associate producer (France), International sales | Cannes 2008 - Un certain regard |
| 2008 | Installation | Shirin Neshat | Fazeh | Fazeh | Producer (France, Germany) | ARoS Aarhus Kunstmuseum 2008 |
| 2008 | Installation | Shirin Neshat | Munis | Munis | Producer (France, Germany | ARoS Aarhus Kunstmuseum 2008 |
| 2008 | Installation | Shirin Neshat | Farokh Legha | Farokh Legha | Producer (France, Germany) | ARoS Aarhus Kunstmuseum 2008 |
| 2007 | Feature | Roy Andersson | Du levande | You, the Living | Producer (France, Germany), International sales | Cannes 2007 - Un certain regard |
| 2007 | Feature | Antonio Campos | Afterschool | Afterschool | International sales | Cannes 2007 - Un certain regard |
| 2007 | Feature | Ulrich Seidl | Import/Export | Import/Export | Producer (France, Germany), International sales | Cannes 2007 - Competition |
| 2007 | Feature | Spiros Stathoupoulos | PVC-1 | PVC-1 | International sales | Cannes 2007 - Quinzaine des réalisateurs |
| 2006 | Feature | Corneliu Porumboiu | A fost sau n-a fost? | 12:08 East of Bucharest | International sales | Cannes 2006 - Quinzaine des réalisateurs - Camera d'Or & Prix Europa Cinema |
| 2006 | Shorts collection | Various artists | Destricted | Destricted | International sales | Sundance 2006, Cannes Critics' Week 2006, Locarno 2006 |
| 2005 | Feature | Ilya Khrzhanovsky | 4 | 4 | International sales | Rotterdam 2005 - Tiger Award |
| 2005 | Feature | Kornél Mundruczó | Johanna | Johanna | International sales | Cannes 2005 - Un certain regard |
| 2005 | Short | Ruben Östlund | Scen nr: 6882 ur mitt liv | Autobiographical Scene Number 6882 | International sales | Edinburgh 2005 - Best European Short |
| 2005 | Feature | Cristi Puiu | Moartea domnului Lăzărescu | Death of Mr. Lazarescu | International sales | Cannes 2005 - Prize Un certain regard |
| 2005 | Feature | Carlos Reygadas | Batalla en el cielo | Battle in Heaven | Producer (France), International sales | Cannes 2005 - Competition |
| 2005 | Installation | Shirin Neshat | Zarin | Zarin | Producer (Germany) | Gladstone Gallery New York 2005 |
| 2004 | Feature | Jessica Hausner | Hotel | Hotel | Producer (Germany), International sales | Cannes 2004 - Un certain regard |
| 2004 | Short | Kornél Mundruczó | Little Apochrypha No. | Kis apokrif no. 2 | International sales | Cannes 2004 - Cinèfondation |
| 2004 | Installation | Shirin Neshat | Mahdokht | Mahdokht | Producer (France, Germany | Hamburger Bahnhof Berlin 2005 |
| 2003 | Feature | Michelangelo Frammartino | Il dono | Il Dono | International sales | Locarno 2003 - Jury's Choice |
| 2003 | Feature | Alain Guiraudie | Pas de repos pour les braves | Pas de repos pour les braves | International sales | Cannes 2003 - Quinzaine des réalisateurs |
| 2003 | Short | Kornél Mundruczó | Joan of Arc of the Night Bus | Joan of Arc of the Night Bus | International sales | Cannes 2003 - Quinzaine des réalisateurs |
| 2003 | Feature | Dagur Kári | Nói Albinói | Nói Albinói | Producer (Germany), International sales | Göteborg 2003 - Fipresci Award |
| 2003 | Feature | Ulrich Seidl | Jesus, Du weisst | Jesus, You Know | International sales | Viennale 2003 - Competition - Grand Prix |
| 2003 | Short | Cristi Puiu | Cigarettes and Coffee | Cigarettes and Coffee | International sales | Berlinale 2004 - Golden Bear and European Short Film |
| 2002 | Feature | Kornél Mundruczó | Szép napok | Pleasant Days | Producer (Germany), International sales | Locarno 2002 - Silver Leopard |
| 2002 | Short | Kornél Mundruczó | Little Apochrypha No.1 | Kis apokrif no. 1 | International Sales | Oberhausen 2002 - Ecumenical Jury Prize |
| 2001 | Series | Stéphane Aubier Vincent Patar | Panique au village - Série télévisée | A Town Called Panic - Series | International sales | Annecy 2001 - Grand Prix |
| 2001 | Feature | Jessica Hausner | Lovely Rita | Lovely Rita | Producer (Germany), International sales | Cannes 2001 - Un certain regard |
| 2001 | Feature | Ulrich Seidl | Hundstage | Dog Days | Producer (Germany), International sales | Venice 2001 - Competition - Grand Prix |
| 2001 | Short | Kornél Mundruczó | Afta | Afta | International sales | Kraków 200 - Silver Dragon |
| 2000 | Feature | Roy Andersson | Sånger från andra våningen | Songs from the Second Floor | Producer (France, Germany), International sales | Cannes 2000 - Competition - Jury Prize |
| 2000 | Feature | Lou Ye | Suzhou he | Suzhou River | Producer (Germany), International sales | Rotterdam 2000 - Tiger Award |
| 1999 | Short | Jessica Hausner | Inter-view | Inter-view | International sales | Cannes 1999 - Cinéfondation Award - Special Mention |
| 1999 | Feature | Takashi Miike | Ōdishon | Audition | International sales | Rotterdam 2000 - Fipresci Award |
| 1999 | Feature | Ulrich Seidl | Models | Models | International sales | Sarajevo 1999 - Audience Award |
| 1996 | Feature | Lars Von Trier | Breaking the Waves | Breaking the Waves | Producer (France, Germany) | Cannes 1996 - Competition - Grand Prix |
| 1995 | Short | Jessica Hausner | Flora | Flora | International sales | Locarno 1996 - Leopard of Tomorrw |
| 1995 | Feature | Lars Von Trier | Riget | The Kingdom | Producer (Germany), International sales | Venice 1996 - Out of Competition |
| 1991 | Feature | Lars Von Trier | Europa | Europa | Associate producer (Germany) | Cannes 1991 - Competition - Jury Prize |
| 1990 | Feature | Ulrich Seidl | Good News: Von Kolporteuren, toten Hunden und anderen Wienern | Good News | International sales | Viennale 1990 - Wiener Film Prize |
| 1987 | Short | Roy Andersson | Någonting har hänt | Something Happened | International sales | Clermond-Ferrand 1993 - Press and Special Jury Prize |
| 1987 | Series | Stéphane Aubier Vincent Patar | Pic Pic André | Pic Pic André | International sales | Bruxelles 1989 - Animation Award |
| 1982 | Short | Ulrich Seidl | Der Ball | The Prom | International sales | |
| 1970 | Feature | Roy Andersson | En kärlekshistoria | A Swedish Love Story | International sales | Berlin 1970 - IWG Golden Plaque, Interfilm Award and Journalists' Special Award |
