= 2008 NatFilm Festival =

2008 NatFilm Poster

The 2008 NatFilm Festival ran from March 28, 2008 to April 6, 2008. NatFilm Festival is now merged with CIFF into one single event, CPH PIX, launched on April 16–26, 2009.

== Programme ==
=== Special Tribute ===
The 2008 Special Tribute retrospective exhibited the work of Trine Dyrholm. The film 'Dansen' was shown as part of the 'Dansk Film 2008' section of the programme.

=== Retrospectives ===
Edward Yang

The director's entire oeuvre of eight films was shown in memoriam, comprising A Brighter Summer Day, A Confucian Confusion, In Our Time, Mahjong, Taipei Story, That Day on the Beach, Terrorizers, and Yi Yi.

Roy Andersson

Sange fra anden sal (Songs from the Second Floor), Giliap, En kærlighedshistorie (A Swedish Love Story), his 2007 release Du Levande (You, the Living), and a series of the director's short films were shown.

Charles Burnett

Killer of Sheep, My Brother's Wedding, and a series of four shorts ("When It Rains", "The Horse", "Several Friends" and "Quiet As Kept") were shown.

Louis de Funès

Fantômas, Le Petit Baigneur, and La Grande Vadrouille were shown.

Guy Maddin

My Winnipeg, Brand Upon the Brain, and The Saddest Music in the World were shown.

=== CPH:DOX ===
Features shared with the Copenhagen International Documentary Festival (CPH:DOX) were A Jihad for Love by Parvez Sharma and In Prison My Whole Life by Marc Evans.

== See also ==
- NatFilm Festival
