= Deep focus =

Photographic and cinematographic technique using a large depth of field

Diagram of decreasing apertures, that is, increasing f-numbers, in one-stop increments; each aperture has half the light gathering area of the previous one. The actual size of the aperture will depend on the focal length of the lens.

Deep focus is a photographic and cinematographic technique using a large depth of field. Depth of field is the front-to-back range of focus in an image, or how much of it appears sharp and clear. In deep focus, the foreground, middle ground, and background are all in focus.

Deep focus is normally achieved by choosing a small aperture. Since the aperture of a camera determines how much light enters through the lens, achieving deep focus requires a bright scene or long exposure. A wide-angle lens also makes a larger portion of the image appear sharp.

It is also possible to achieve the illusion of deep focus with optical tricks (split-focus diopter) or by compositing two or more images together using focus stacking.

The opposite of deep focus is shallow focus, in which the plane of the image that is in focus is very shallow. For example, the foreground might be in focus while the middle-ground and background are out-of-focus. When avoiding deep focus is used specifically for aesthetic effect—especially when the subject is in sharp focus while the background is noticeably out-of-focus—the technique is known as bokeh.

== Deep focus and deep space ==
When deep focus is used, filmmakers often combine it with deep space (also called deep staging). Deep space is a part of mise-en-scène, placing significant actors and props in different planes of the picture. Directors and cinematographers may use deep space without using deep focus, being either an artistic choice or because they do not have resources to create a deep focus look, or both.

Directors may use deep focus in only some scenes or even just some shots. Other auteurs choose to use it consistently throughout the movie, either as a stylistic choice or because they believe it represents reality better. Filmmakers such as Akira Kurosawa, Stanley Kubrick, Kenji Mizoguchi, Orson Welles, Masahiro Shinoda, Akio Jissoji, Terry Gilliam, Jean Renoir, Jacques Tati, James Wong Howe and Gregg Toland all used deep focus as part of their signature style.

For French film critic André Bazin, deep-focus visual style was central to his theory of realism in film. He elaborated in an analysis of how deep focus functions in a scene from Wyler's The Best Years of Our Lives:

The action in the foreground is secondary, although interesting and peculiar enough to require our keen attention since it occupies a privileged place and surface on the screen. Paradoxically, the true action, the one that constitutes at this precise moment a turning point in the story, develops almost clandestinely in a tiny rectangle at the back of the room—in the left corner of the screen.... Thus the viewer is induced actively to participate in the drama planned by the director.

== Deep focus and different formats ==
The choice of shooting format affects how easy it would be to achieve a deep focus look. This is because the size of the sensor or film gauge dictates what particular lens focal length would be used in order to achieve a desired viewing angle. Smaller sensors or film gauges will require an overall range of shorter focal lengths to achieve any desired viewing angle than larger sensors or film gauges. Because depth of field is a characteristic of lens focal length (in addition to aperture and focus distance setting), it is easier to achieve a deep-focus look with a smaller imaging sensor or film gauge. For example, a 40mm lens will give a 30-degree horizontal angle of view in the Super35 format. To achieve the same viewing angle with a 1/2" 16:9 sensor, you would need a 13mm lens. A 13mm lens inherently has much more depth-of-field than a 40mm lens. To achieve the same depth of field with a 40mm lens would require a very small aperture, which in turn would require far more light, and therefore time and expense.

Some filmmakers make deliberate use of the deep-focus capabilities of digital formats. Miami Vice (Michael Mann, 2006), a movie that was shot digitally early in the conversion from film to digital formats, made use of this capability. Cinematographer Dion Beebe commented:

We also decided that there were attributes of HD technology we liked and wanted to exploit, like the increased depth of field. Because of the cameras' chip size (2/3"), they have excessive depth of field that we decided not to fight, but rather utilize.

== Split-focus diopter ==
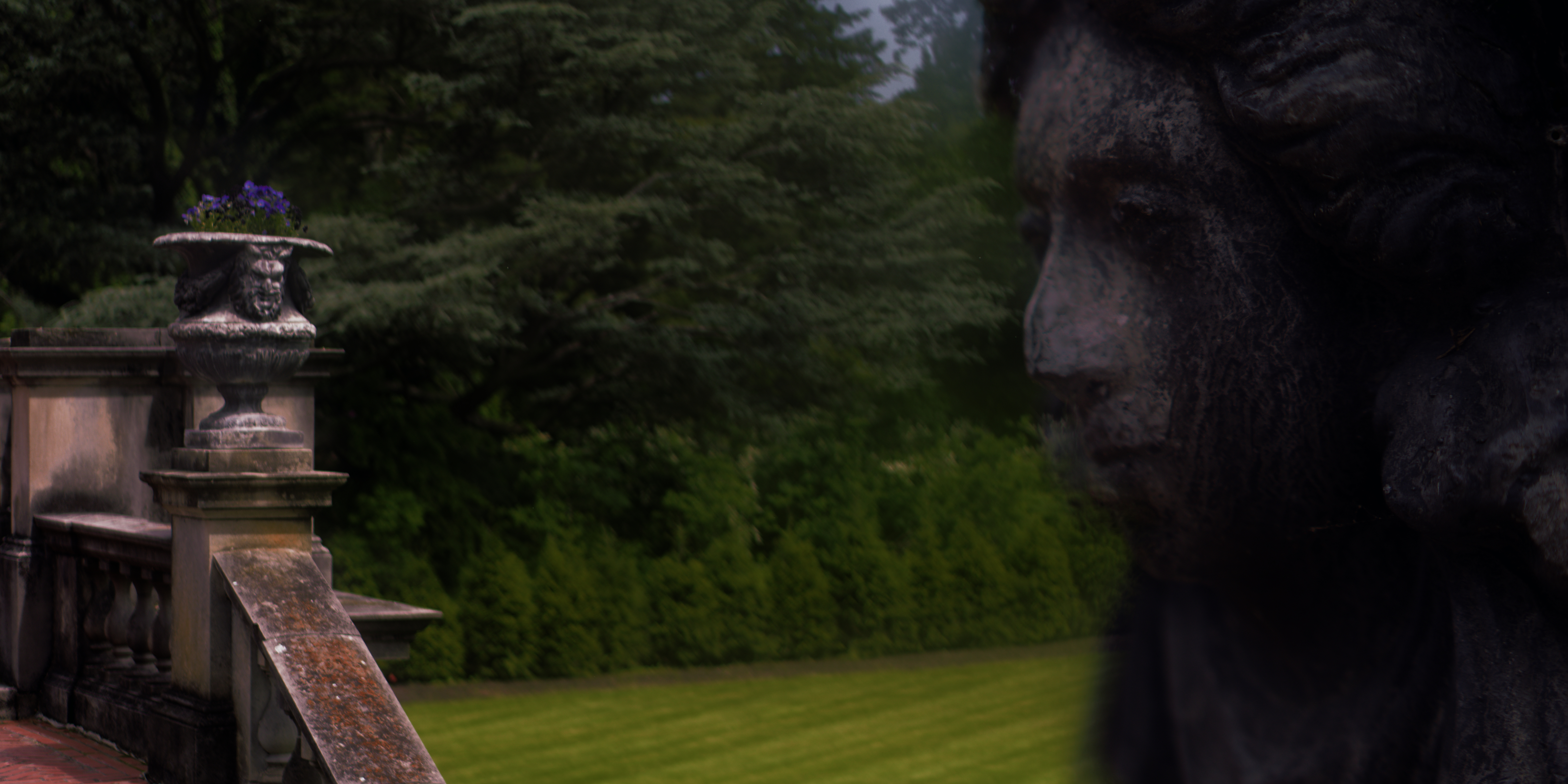
Split-field diopter focus of two statues in a garden, one close and one further away

In the 1970s, directors made frequent use of the split-focus diopter. With this invention it was possible to have one plane in focus in one part of the picture and a different plane in focus in the other half of the picture. This was and still is very useful for the anamorphic widescreen format, which has less depth of field.

A split diopter is half convex glass that attaches in front of the camera's main lens to make half the lens nearsighted. The lens can focus on a plane in the background and the diopter on a foreground. A split diopter does not create real deep focus, only the illusion of this. What distinguishes it from traditional deep focus is that there is not continuous depth of field from foreground to background; the space between the two sharp objects is out of focus. Because split focus diopters only cover half the lens, shots in which they are used are characterized by a blurred line between the two planes in focus.

The diopter gave the opportunity for spectacular deep focus-compositions that would have been impossible to achieve otherwise. In the American New Wave, director Brian De Palma explored the possibilities of the split-focus diopter extensively, as did other '70s films such as Robert Wise's The Andromeda Strain and Star Trek: The Motion Picture.

== Use in modern films ==
Starting in the 1980s, American cinema has developed a trend that film scholar David Bordwell calls intensified continuity. Bordwell claims that:

1. The average length of each shot in a film has become shorter over the years
2. Scenes are built up by closer framing
3. More extreme focal lengths are used
4. The scenes include an increased number of camera moves

This trend has led to deep focus becoming less common in Hollywood movies. As mentioned in Bordwell's second point, master shots where two or more characters hold a conversation have gone out of fashion, lessening the need for deep focus. In a contemporary Hollywood movie a dialogue scene may consist only of tight close-ups, with the master shot abandoned. If more than one plane in the image contains narrative information, filmmakers switch focus ("rack focusing") instead of keeping both focal planes sharp.

== Notable uses ==
The following films and television programs contain notable examples of deep-focus photography:

Carrie, 1976

=== Black and white ===
- Foolish Wives (1922)
- Nosferatu (1922)
- Greed (1924)
- All Quiet on the Western Front (1930)
- Mad Love (1935)
- Dodsworth (1936)
- Osaka Elegy (1936)
- Dead End (1937)
- La Grande Illusion (1937)
- The Hunchback of Notre Dame (1939)
- La Règle du Jeu (1939)
- Rebecca (1940)
- Citizen Kane (1941)
- The Devil and Daniel Webster (1941)
- The Magnificent Ambersons (1942)
- The Best Years of Our Lives (1946)
- The Stranger (1946)
- The Lady from Shanghai (1947)
- Drunken Angel (1948)
- Macbeth (1948)
- Oliver Twist (1948)
- All the King's Men (1949)
- Late Spring (1949)
- Stray Dog (1949)
- The Third Man (1949)
- Rashomon (1950)
- Sunset Boulevard (1950)
- Detective Story (1951)
- Strangers on a Train (1951)
- Tokyo Story (1953)
- Ugetsu (1953)
- The Crucified Lovers (1954)
- Sansho the Bailiff (1954)
- Seven Samurai (1954)
- Mr. Arkadin (1955)
- The Night of the Hunter (1955)
- The Killing (1956)
- 12 Angry Men (1957)
- 3:10 to Yuma (1957)
- Paths of Glory (1957)
- Throne of Blood (1957)
- Tokyo Twilight (1957)
- Sweet Smell of Success (1957)
- Touch of Evil (1958)
- L'Avventura (1960)
- The Bad Sleep Well (1960)
- Psycho (1960)
- The Hustler (1961)
- The Innocents (1961)
- La Notte (1961)
- Yojimbo (1961)
- Birdman of Alcatraz (1962)
- Cape Fear (1962)
- L'Eclisse (1962)
- Knife in the Water (1962)
- The Manchurian Candidate (1962)
- The Trial (1962)
- Two for the Seesaw (1962)
- The Haunting (1963)
- High and Low (1963)
- Hud (1963)
- Seven Days in May (1964)
- The Train (1964)
- Chimes at Midnight (1965)
- The Hill (1965)
- Red Beard (1965)
- Repulsion (1965)
- Cul-de-sac (1966)
- Nayak (1966)
- Persona (1966)
- Seconds (1966)
- I, the Executioner (1968)
- Faces (1968)
- The Last Picture Show (1971)
- Paper Moon (1973)
- The Good German (2006)
- The Lighthouse (2019 film) (2019)

=== Color ===
- The Man Who Knew Too Much (1956)
- The Bridge on the River Kwai (1957)
- Vertigo (1958)
- Ben Hur (1959)
- Floating Weeds (1959)
- North by Northwest (1959)
- Breakfast at Tiffany's (1961)
- How the West Was Won (1962)
- Lawrence of Arabia (1962)
- The Birds (1963)
- A Fistful of Dollars (1964)
- For a Few Dollars More (1965)
- The Ipcress File (1965)
- The Appaloosa (1966)
- The Good, the Bad and the Ugly (1966)
- Rosemary's Baby (1968)
- The Wild Bunch (1969)
- A Clockwork Orange (1971)
- Macbeth (1971)
- Aguirre, the Wrath of God (1972)
- The Offence (1972)
- Chinatown (1974)
- Barry Lyndon (1975)
- Jaws (1975)
- Jeanne Dielman, 23 quai du Commerce, 1080 Bruxelles (1975)
- All the President's Men (1976)
- The Tenant (1976)
- Carrie (1976)
- Close Encounters of the Third Kind (1977)
- Nosferatu the Vampyre (1979)
- The Shining (1980)
- Blow Out (1981)
- Fitzcarraldo (1982)
- Rumble Fish (1983)
- Brazil (1985)
- Full Metal Jacket (1987)
- Jurassic Park (1993)
- Casino (1995)
- Saving Private Ryan (1998)
- Eyes Wide Shut (1999)
- Songs from the Second Floor (2000)
- Life or Something like it (2002)
- The Pianist (2002)
- Peter Pan (2003)
- Harry Potter and the Prisoner of Azkaban (2004)
- The New World (2005)
- The Black Dahlia (2006)
- The History Boys (2006)
- You, the Living (2007)
- Zodiac (2007)
- Speed Racer (2008)
- Jennifer’s Body (2009)
- The Ghost Writer (2010)
- Carnage (2011)
- A Pigeon Sat on a Branch Reflecting on Existence (2014)
- It Follows (2014)
- The Hateful Eight (2015)
- Ouija: Origin of Evil (2016)
- Suspiria (2018)
- Us (2019)
- Toy Story 4 (2019)
- The End of Oak Street (2026)
- Teenage Sex and Death at Camp Miasma (2026)

- See also
- Group f/64
- Hyperfocal distance
- Light field camera
