= List of Swedish submissions for the Academy Award for Best International Feature Film =

Best International Feature Film submissions from Sweden

Highlights
- Debut: 1956
- Submissions: 66
- Nominations: 16
- Oscar winners: 3

Sweden has submitted films for the Academy Award for Best International Feature Film (Note: The category was previously named the Academy Award for Best Foreign Language Film, but this was changed to the Academy Award for Best International Feature Film in April 2019, after the Academy deemed the word "Foreign" to be outdated.) since the inaugural award in 1956. Its selection is handed out annually by representatives from the Guldbagge Awards jury.

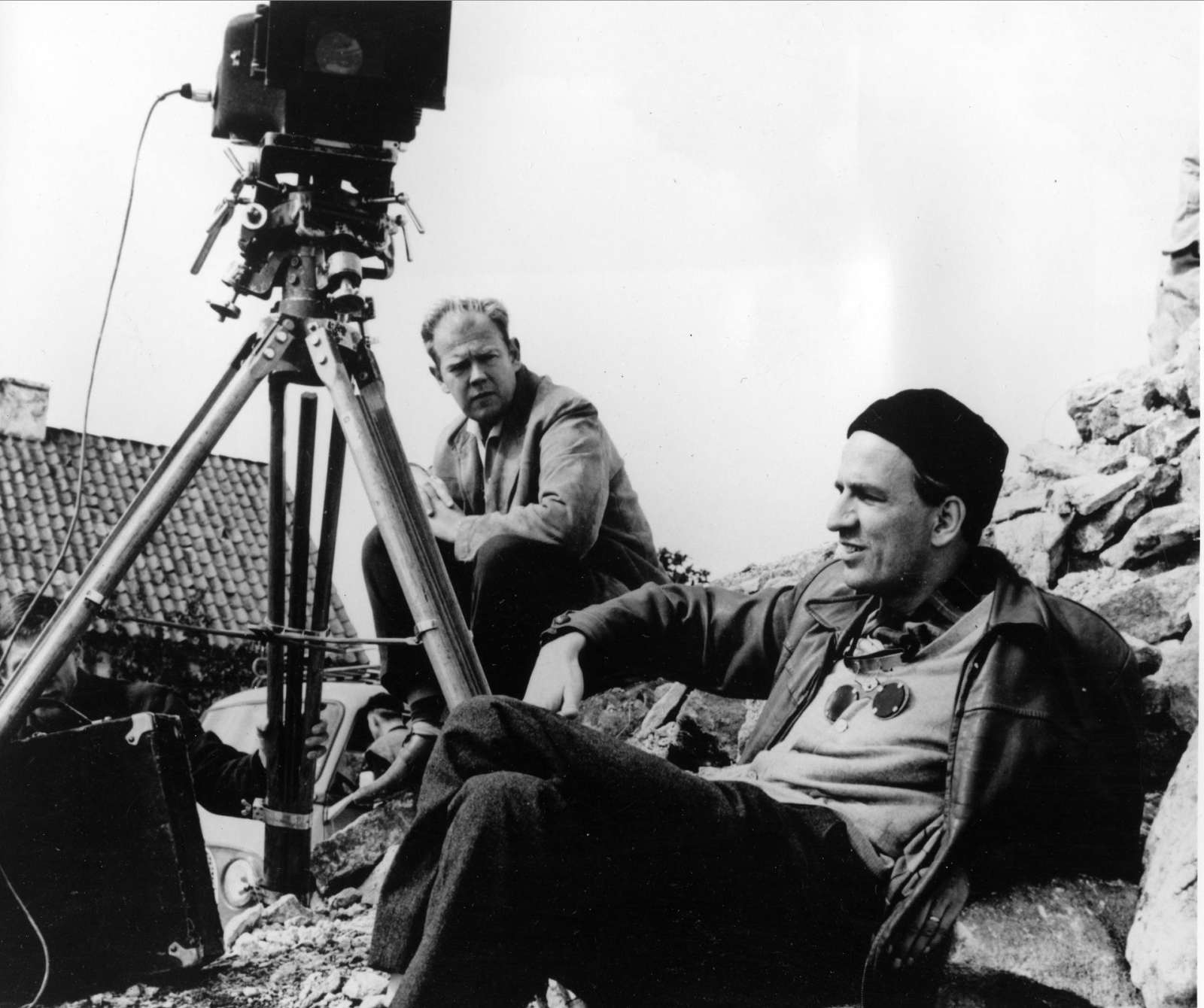
Bergman with his longtime cinematographer Sven Nykvist during the production of Through a Glass Darkly, which won the award in 1961.

As of 2026, Sweden has been nominated sixteen times, winning in three occasions, for The Virgin Spring (1960), Through a Glass Darkly (1961) and Fanny and Alexander (1983), all of them were directed by Ingmar Bergman.

== Submissions ==
The Academy of Motion Picture Arts and Sciences has invited the film industries of various countries to submit their best film for the Academy Award for Best International Feature Film since 1956. The International Feature Film Committee oversees the process and reviews all the submitted films. Following this, they vote via secret ballot to determine the five nominees for the award.

Ingmar Bergman is the most submitted filmmaker with nine films selected. He also was nominated in three occasions, winning in all of them, for: The Virgin Spring (1960), Through a Glass Darkly (1961) and Fanny and Alexander (1983) His Scenes from a Marriage (1974) was ineligible due to previously aired on Swedish television, which led to debate about the eligibility by American filmmakers. According to Robert Osborne, the country did not enter in 1975 as a protest. In 1978, however, the country did not submit his film Autumn Sonata and made no entry, but the film was nominated for Best Actress and Best Writing (Screenplay Written Directly for the Screen).

Nominated films include: Raven's End (1964), Dear John (1965), Ådalen 31 (1969), The Emigrants (1971), The New Land (1972), Flight of the Eagle (1982), The Ox (1991), All Things Fair (1995), Under the Sun (1998), Evil (2003), As It Is in Heaven (2004), A Man Called Ove (2016), and The Square (2017).

Everlasting Moments (2008), Simple Simon (2010), Force Majeure (2014), and Boy from Heaven (2022), advanced to the December shortlists, but were not nominated.

Pelle the Conqueror (1988), was a Swedish-Danish co-production, but won the award representing Denmark. The Best Intentions (1992), directed by Bille August and written by Ingmar Bergman, was the country initial selection. It had won the Palme d'Or at the 1992 Cannes Film Festival, but the Academy deemed the film ineligible because the same material had previously aired as a television miniseries before being re-edited as a theatrical film. Lilya 4-ever (2002) submission was met with controversy for having most of its dialogue in Russian and not Swedish. Eventually it was accepted as eligible, but did not receive a nomination.

Most of the submitted films are primary in Swedish, with the exceptions of Lilya 4-ever (2002), in Russian, Boy from Heaven (2022) and Eagles of the Republic (2025), both in Arabic. Below is a list of the films that have been submitted by Sweden for review by the Academy for the award by year.

Year (Ceremony)	Film title used in nomination	Original title	Director	Result
1956 (29th)	The Staffan Stolle Story	Ratataa	Hasse Ekman	Not nominated
1957 (30th)	The Seventh Seal	Det sjunde inseglet	Ingmar Bergman	Not nominated
1958 (31st)	The Magician	Ansiktet	Ingmar Bergman	Not nominated
1960 (33rd)	The Virgin Spring	Jungfrukällan	Ingmar Bergman	Won Academy Award
1961 (34th)	Through a Glass Darkly	Såsom i en spegel	Ingmar Bergman	Won Academy Award
1962 (35th)	The Mistress	Älskarinnan	Vilgot Sjöman	Not nominated
1963 (36th)	The Silence	Tystnaden	Ingmar Bergman	Not nominated
1964 (37th)	Raven's End	Kvarteret Korpen	Bo Widerberg	Nominated
1965 (38th)	Dear John	Käre John	Lars-Magnus Lindgren	Nominated
1966 (39th)	Persona		Ingmar Bergman	Not nominated
1967 (40th)	Here's Your Life	Här har du ditt liv	Jan Troell	Not nominated
1968 (41st)	Shame	Skammen	Ingmar Bergman	Not nominated
1969 (42nd)	Ådalen 31		Bo Widerberg	Nominated
1970 (43rd)	A Swedish Love Story	En kärlekshistoria	Roy Andersson	Not nominated
1971 (44th)	The Emigrants	Utvandrarna	Jan Troell	Nominated
1972 (45th)	The New Land	Nybyggarna	Jan Troell	Nominated
1973 (46th)	Scenes from a Marriage	Scener ur ett äktenskap	Ingmar Bergman	Disqualified
1976 (49th)	City of My Dreams	Mina drömmars stad	Ingvar Skogsberg	Not nominated
1977 (50th)	The Man on the Roof	Mannen på taket	Bo Widerberg	Not nominated
1979 (52nd)	A Respectable Life	Ett anständigt liv	Stefan Jarl	Not nominated
1980 (53rd)	Herr Puntila and His Servant Matti	Herr Puntila och hans dräng Matti	Ralf Långbacka	Not nominated
1981 (54th)	Children's Island	Barnens ö	Kay Pollak	Not nominated
1982 (55th)	Flight of the Eagle	Ingenjör Andrées luftfärd	Jan Troell	Nominated
1983 (56th)	Fanny and Alexander	Fanny och Alexander	Ingmar Bergman	Won Academy Award
1984 (57th)	Åke and His World	Åke och hans värld	Allan Edwall	Not nominated
1985 (58th)	Ronia, the Robber's Daughter	Ronja Rövardotter	Tage Danielsson	Not nominated
1986 (59th)	The Sacrifice	Offret	Andrei Tarkovsky	Not nominated
1987 (60th)	Hip Hip Hurrah!	Hip Hip Hurra!	Kjell Grede	Not nominated
1989 (62nd)	The Women on the Roof	Kvinnorna på taket	Carl-Gustav Nykvist	Not nominated
1990 (63rd)	Good Evening, Mr. Wallenberg	God afton, Herr Wallenberg	Kjell Grede	Not nominated
1991 (64th)	The Ox	Oxen	Sven Nykvist	Nominated
1992 (65h)	House of Angels	Änglagård	Colin Nutley	Not nominated
1993 (66th)	The Slingshot	Kådisbellan	Åke Sandgren	Not nominated
1994 (67th)	The Last Dance	Sista dansen	Colin Nutley	Not nominated
1995 (68th)	All Things Fair	Lust och fägring stor	Bo Widerberg	Nominated
1996 (69th)	Jerusalem		Bille August	Not nominated
1997 (70th)	Tic Tac		Daniel Alfredson	Not nominated
1998 (71st)	Show Me Love	Fucking Åmål	Lukas Moodysson	Not nominated
1999 (72nd)	Under the Sun	Under solen	Colin Nutley	Nominated
2000 (73rd)	Songs from the Second Floor	Sånger från andra våningen	Roy Andersson	Not nominated
2001 (74th)	Jalla! Jalla!		Josef Fares	Not nominated
2002 (75th)	Lilya 4-ever		Lukas Moodysson	Not nominated
2003 (76th)	Evil	Ondskan	Mikael Håfström	Nominated
2004 (77th)	As It Is in Heaven	Så som i himmelen	Kay Pollak	Nominated
2005 (78th)	Zozo		Josef Fares	Not nominated
2006 (79th)	Falkenberg Farewell	Farväl Falkenberg	Jesper Ganslandt	Not nominated
2007 (80th)	You, the Living	Du levande	Roy Andersson	Not nominated
2008 (81st)	Everlasting Moments	Maria Larssons eviga ögonblick	Jan Troell	Made shortlist
2009 (82nd)	Involuntary	De ofrivilliga	Ruben Östlund	Not nominated
2010 (83rd)	Simple Simon	I rymden finns inga känslor	Andreas Öhman	Made shortlist
2011 (84th)	Beyond	Svinalängorna	Pernilla August	Not nominated
2012 (85th)	The Hypnotist	Hypnotisören	Lasse Hallström	Not nominated
2013 (86th)	Eat Sleep Die	Äta sova dö	Gabriela Pichler	Not nominated
2014 (87th)	Force Majeure	Turist	Ruben Östlund	Made shortlist
2015 (88th)	A Pigeon Sat on a Branch Reflecting on Existence	En duva satt på en gren och funderade över tillvaron	Roy Andersson	Not nominated
2016 (89th)	A Man Called Ove	En man som heter Ove	Hannes Holm	Nominated
2017 (90th)	The Square		Ruben Östlund	Nominated
2018 (91st)	Border	Gräns	Ali Abbasi	Not nominated
2019 (92nd)	And Then We Danced		Levan Akin	Not nominated
2020 (93rd)	Charter		Amanda Kernell	Not nominated
2021 (94th)	Tigers	Tigrar	Ronnie Sandahl	Not nominated
2022 (95th)	Boy from Heaven	صبي من الجنة	Tarik Saleh	Made shortlist
2023 (96th)	Opponent	Motståndaren	Milad Alami	Not nominated
2024 (97th)	The Last Journey	Den sista resan	Filip Hammar and Fredrik Wikingsson	Not nominated
2025 (98th)	Eagles of the Republic		Tarik Saleh	Not nominated
2026 (99th)	Adult Supervision	Arkipelag	Alex Schulman	Pending

== Shortlisted films ==
Each year since 2019, the Swedish Oscar selection committee has announced a three-film shortlist prior to announcing the official Swedish Oscar candidate. The following films were shortlisted by Sweden but not selected as the final candidate:

Year	Film
2019	Aniara · The Perfect Patient
2020	About Endlessness · I Am Greta
2021	Clara Sola · The Emigrants
2022	I Am Zlatan · Nelly & Nadine
2023	Paradise Is Burning · Together 99
2024	Crossing · Shame on Dry Land
2025	The Dance Club · Israel Palestine on Swedish TV 1958-1989
2026	Brace Your Heart · Bloody Men

== See also ==
- List of Academy Award winners and nominees for Best International Feature Film
- List of Academy Award-winning foreign language films
- Cinema of Sweden
