= Something Happened (film) =

- Directed by: Roy Andersson
- Written by: Roy Andersson
- Starring: Klas Gösta Olsson; Anne Tubin; Lennart Björklund
- Cinematography: István Borbás
- Edited by: Roy Andersson
- Production company: Swedish National Board of Health and Welfare
- Release date: 1987
- Running time: 23 minutes
- Country: Sweden
- Language: Swedish

Something Happened (Swedish: Någonting har hänt) is a Swedish film directed by Roy Andersson. The film was conceived as an educational film about AIDS, but raised controversy and was withdrawn. Today the film is regarded as a significant step in the development of the style seen in the director's later and more acclaimed films.

== Production ==
In 1986, the Swedish National Board of Health and Welfare contracted Roy Andersson to write and direct an information film about AIDS to be shown in Swedish schools and to military conscripts. At the time, Andersson had not made a film since the financially unsuccessful Giliap from 1975, and had since then mainly worked with television commercials. Before the film was finished, however, the Board asked Andersson to abandon the project. The board had seen the finished parts and questioned Andersson's sources, and were also sceptical about the overall approach and tone of the film. Andersson continued to work on the project on his own and eventually finished it.

The film introduces what would become the director's signature style, with static camera and long takes featuring hand-picked amateur actors in grim make-up. The style had been hinted at in Giliap and was developed further in Andersson's commercials, later to be even more refined in the feature films Songs from the Second Floor and You, the Living.

== HIV origin theory ==
In the film, Andersson strongly criticises the widespread theory of HIV's origin in Africa. Included are scenes featuring scientists promoting this theory in ways which make them appear as incompetent and racist.

== Release ==
Following the positive reception of Andersson's 1991 short film World of Glory, Something Happened was in 1993 screened at a number of international film festivals, where it received several awards.
