= NatFilm Festival =

Coordinates: 55°40′N 12°34′E

- Festival Logo
- Location: Principally Copenhagen, Denmark (see text)
- Language: International
- Website: http://www.natfilm.dk

The NatFilm Festival, staged annually across 16 cinemas in Copenhagen, in addition to several in Odense, Aalborg (replaced by Kolding in 2007) and Århus, shows the widest programme of films to the largest festival audience in Denmark. Established in 1990, it rivals the more recently established Copenhagen International Film Festival which emerged in 2003 in prestige though not directly - NatFilm generally occurs in Easter, around the beginning of April, whereas the CIFF is staged in September. Since 2003 NatFilm has steadily attracted a total audience of around 35,000 over its annual ten-day run.

The Copenhagen International Documentary Festival, or CPH:DOX, is an offspring of the NatFilm festival occurring in November. It usually shares some of its more popular or controversial offerings with NatFilm.

The Festival has become an important platform for domestic distributors, who exhibit a range of new films from Bollywood to J-Horror to festival-goers to both gauge and encourage their likely popularity and profitability in the Danish and wider Scandinavian market; the Audience Prize, selected from amongst recent productions that have no scheduled distribution in Denmark, guarantees funds for the theatrical release of the winning film.

The 19th and last staging of the festival, the 2008 NatFilm Festival, occurred between March 28 and April 6, 2008. In 2009, NatFilm and the CIFF were merged into a single event, CPH PIX, which launched on April 16–26, 2009.

== The Festival ==
=== The Programme ===
NatFilm generally presents a wide selection of recent international releases targeting certain regions and genres, a programme of Danish films, and a more general retrospective with some particular tributes. Every year since its conception a particular figure in the industry has been selected for a Special Tribute, in which a retrospective of their work has been shown.

To date, NatFilm Festival tributes have comprised the following:

| Year | Special Tribute | Other Tributes |
|---|---|---|
| 2008 | Trine Dyrholm | Edward Yang, Roy Andersson, Charles Burnett, Louis de Funès, Guy Maddin |
| 2007 | Andy Lau | Alejandro Jodorowsky, Minoru Kawasaki |
| 2006 | Rani Mukerji | Kenneth Anger |
| 2005 | Valeria Bruni-Tedeschi | Tomu Uchida |
| 2004 | Rock Hudson | Shaw Brothers |
| 2003 | Harriet Andersson | Kinji Fukasaku |
| 2002 | Erich von Stroheim | Youssef Chahine, Michael Haneke, Josè Mojica Marins |
| 2001 | Anna Karina | Johnnie To, Claire Denis, Larry Cohen |
| 2000 | Klaus Kinski | |
| 1999 | Maggie Cheung | |
| 1998 | Paul Newman | |
| 1997 | Jeanne Moreau | |
| 1996 | Orson Welles | |
| 1995 | Catherine Deneuve | Peter Emil Refn |
| 1994 | Marilyn Monroe | |
| 1993 | Clint Eastwood | |
| 1992 | Marlon Brando | |
| 1991 | Marlene Dietrich | |
| 1990 | Robert Mitchum | |

=== The Awards ===
Audience Award

The bulk of the festival programme consists of titles not scheduled for Danish distribution, and all participating films without a prior distribution deal for Denmark compete for the Audience Prize of 125.000 DKK (c. $20,000) earmarked for national theatrical release.

Recent recipients of this award include Ten Canoes by Rolf de Heer in 2007 and All My Friends Are Leaving Brisbane by Louise Alston in 2008.

Natsværmerpris

The festival is organised by Natsværmerfonden, an independent foundation established to support young Danish film-makers, and every year a stipend of DKK 25,000 is awarded to one or more individuals considered to have made a valuable contribution to Danish film.

Notable prior recipients of this award include Lars von Trier, Thomas Vinterberg and Natasha Arthy.

Critics Award

The Critics Award was introduced in 2004. Each year a panel of three international judges chooses a winner from around ten nominated films, all debut or second features of selected directors. The award is announced at the festival's closing gala and comes with a stipend of DKK 25,000.

Other awards

Other awards and prizes offered intermittently in the festival's history include a Danmark Radio Filmland Award, Canal+ Script Award and Grand Prix.

== International Partners ==
NatFilm Festival is a member of European Coordination of Film Festivals and serves as the official Danish partner of Equinoxe under the presidency of Jeanne Moreau.

== See also ==
- 2008 NatFilm Festival
- Copenhagen International Documentary Festival
