= Something Happened (disambiguation) =

Something Happened, published in 1974, is Joseph Heller's second novel.

Something Happened may also refer to:

- Something Happened (film), a 1987 Swedish film
- "Something Happened" (The IT Crowd), a 2010 episode
- "Something Happened", a 2013 episode of Melissa & Joey
- "Something Happened", a 2017 episode of Law & Order: Special Victims Unit
- "Something Happened", a 1960 song by Paul Anka released as the B-side of "My Home Town"
