= Involuntary (film) =

2008 film by Ruben Östlund

De ofrivilliga
- Theatrical release poster
- Directed by: Ruben Östlund
- Written by: Ruben Östlund; Erik Hemmendorff
- Produced by: Erik Hemmendorff
- Starring: Maria Lundqvist; Leif Edlund; Olle Lijas
- Cinematography: Marius Dybwad Brandrud
- Edited by: Ruben Östlund
- Distributed by: AB Svensk Filmindustri
- Release dates: 19 May 2008 (Cannes); 28 November 2008 (Sweden)
- Running time: 98 minutes
- Country: Sweden
- Language: Swedish

Involuntary (Swedish: De ofrivilliga) is a 2008 Swedish drama film directed by Ruben Östlund, and written by Östlund and Erik Hemmendorff. It is described as "a tragic comedy or comic tragedy", and features five parallel stories with human group behaviour as the common theme. The film is notable for its long takes with no cuts within the scenes. This is related to Östlund's background as a skiing film director, where a cut would only indicate failure. The longest scene lasts for seven minutes.

The film received mainly positive reviews. It has won several awards at international film festivals and was nominated for five Swedish Guldbagge Awards including Best Film, but didn't win in any category. The film was also selected as Sweden's submission for Best Foreign Language Film at the 82nd Academy Awards, but it was not nominated.

== Production ==
The work with the script started already in autumn 2004, when Östlund and Hemmendorff started to write down vignettes on the theme, inspired by or taken directly from their own experiences.

Filming started in the summer 2006. One scene per day was shot during the production, with around 20 takes for each scene, although some scenes demanded far more. The independent stories were shot one at a time, meaning that many of the actors never met before the premiere.

== Release ==
The film premiered on 19 May 2008 at the Cannes Film Festival in the section Un Certain Regard.

== Reception ==
=== Critical response ===
The general reception in Swedish press was positive. As of 14 July 2009 it had an average rating of 4.3 out of 5 based on 24 reviews at the Swedish-language review site Kritiker.se, making it the highest rated Swedish film from 2008. An exception was Jan-Olov Andersson at Aftonbladet, who rated the film 2 out of 5 and dismissed it as "Roy Andersson light."

Involuntary has an approval rating of 81% on review aggregator website Rotten Tomatoes, based on 21 reviews, and an average rating of 6.3/10. Metacritic assigned the film a weighted average score of 74 out of 100, based on 9 critics, indicating generally favorable reviews.

=== Accolades ===
Award	Category	Recipient(s)	Result
Brussels European Film Festival	Golden Iris	Ruben Östlund	Won
Geneva Cinéma Tout Ecran	Best Director	Ruben Östlund	Won
Guldbagge Awards	Best Film	Erik Hemmendorff	Nominated
Guldbagge Awards	Best Director	Ruben Östlund	Nominated
Guldbagge Awards	Best Screenplay	Ruben Östlund and Erik Hemmendorff	Nominated
Guldbagge Awards	Best Supporting Actress	Cecilia Milocco	Nominated
Guldbagge Awards	Best Cinematography	Marius Dybwad Brandrud	Nominated
Mar del Plata Film Festival	Golden Astor	Ruben Östlund	Nominated
Mar del Plata Film Festival	Special Jury Award	Ruben Östlund	Won
Miami International Film Festival	FIPRESCI Award	Involuntary	Won
Milan Film Festival	Special Mention	Ruben Östlund	Won
Palm Springs International Film Festival	FIPRESCI Award for Best Foreign Language Film	Involuntary	Won
Stockholm International Film Festival	Audience Award	Ruben Östlund	Won
Stockholm International Film Festival	Best Screenplay	Ruben Östlund and Erik Hemmendorff	Won

== See also ==
- List of submissions to the 82nd Academy Awards for Best Foreign Language Film
- List of Swedish submissions for the Academy Award for Best Foreign Language Film
