= The Square (2017 film) =

Film by Ruben Östlund

- Theatrical release poster
- Directed by: Ruben Östlund
- Written by: Ruben Östlund
- Produced by: Erik Hemmendorff; Philippe Bober
- Starring: Claes Bang; Elisabeth Moss; Dominic West; Terry Notary
- Cinematography: Fredrik Wenzel
- Edited by: Ruben Östlund; Jacob Secher Schulsinger
- Production companies: Plattform Produktion; Film i Väst; Essential Films; Parisienne; Coproduction Office; Sveriges Television; Imperative Entertainment; Arte France Cinéma; ZDF; Arte; Svenska Filminstitutet; Council of Europe – Eurimages; Medienboard Berlin-Brandenburg; Nordisk Film & TV Fond; Det Danske Filminstitut – Minorordningen; Alamode Filmverleih; TriArt Distribution; DR
- Distributed by: TriArt Film (Sweden); Alamode Filmverleih (Germany); BAC Films (France); Scanbox Entertainment (Denmark)
- Release dates: 20 May 2017 (Cannes); 25 August 2017 (Sweden); 18 October 2017 (France); 19 October 2017 (Germany); 23 November 2017 (Denmark)
- Running time: 151 minutes
- Countries: Sweden; Germany; France; Denmark
- Languages: Swedish; Danish; English
- Budget: $5.5 million
- Box office: $9.5 million

The Square is a 2017 satirical black comedy film written and directed by Ruben Östlund. The film stars Claes Bang, Elisabeth Moss, Dominic West and Terry Notary. A Swedish production with co-production support from Germany, France and Denmark, it was shot in Gothenburg, Stockholm and Berlin. The story was partly inspired by an installation Östlund and producer Kalle Boman had made. Östlund was also inspired by a notorious incident involving Oleg Kulik and cast Notary in a parody, drawing on Notary's experience imitating apes.

The film was entered into the 2017 Cannes Film Festival, where it received positive reviews and won the Palme d'Or. It was subsequently selected for the 2017 Toronto International Film Festival. It went on to win six European Film Awards, including Best Film; two Guldbagge Awards, including Best Director; and other honours. It was nominated for the Academy Award for Best Foreign Language Film at the 90th Academy Awards.

== Plot ==
Christian is the curator of the X-Royal art museum in Stockholm, formerly the Royal Palace. He is interviewed by journalist Anne, struggling to explain museum parlance. Later, Christian is pulled into a confrontation at a pedestrian zone, after which he notices that his smartphone and wallet are missing, along with his cufflinks, presumably stolen in a confidence trick. Christian is able to track the position of his phone on his computer, which he and his assistant Michael trace to a large apartment block.

They write a threatening anonymous letter demanding the return of the phone and wallet by depositing them at a nearby 7-Eleven. Christian puts a copy of the letter through each apartment mailbox that night. Several days later, a package for him is deposited at the store, containing the phone and the completely untouched wallet.

Euphoric after the success of his plan, Christian goes to a party where he meets Anne again, before ending up in her apartment. After the two have sex, Anne offers to throw away a used condom but he steadfastly refuses to hand it over to her. They argue over the situation, as she believes he does not trust her to dispose of the semen rather than take it. Several days later, Anne meets Christian in the museum and states she is looking for more than casual sex. She asks him if he feels the same, but Christian is evasive. When Anne later tries to call him, he does not pick up the phone.

The day after picking up the package, Christian is informed that a second one has arrived for him at the 7-Eleven. Suspicious, he sends Michael to pick it up. In the store, Michael is confronted by a young Arab boy who states that his parents believe that he is a thief because of the letter and demands that Christian apologizes to him and his family. Otherwise, the boy threatens to create "chaos" for him.

Later, the boy visits Christian's home and confronts him, along with his two young daughters, on the staircase. Christian tries to send him away but the boy begins to knock on doors and screaming for help. In a fit of frustration, Christian pushes the boy down the stairs, though no one comes to his aid. Disturbed, Christian desperately searches the trash outside the house for a note which contains the boy's phone number. After finding it and unsuccessfully trying to call him, Christian records an apologetic video message.

In the midst of these troubles, Christian has to manage the promotion of a new exhibition centered on an art piece called The Square by Lola Arias, (Note: Real-life Argentine artist Lola Arias was not involved in creating the film's titular work, and publicly denounced director Ruben Östlund for using her name without her consent. Östlund denied the allegation, saying that she had agreed to it and was misremembering their interaction.) which is described in the artist's statement: "The Square is a sanctuary of trust and caring. Within it we all share equal rights and obligations."

The advertising agency commissioned by the museum to promote The Square states that they need to harness social media attention with something other than the uncontroversial and bland artist's statement. Advertising agency representatives consider a depiction of violence contradicting The Square's message, developing a promotional clip showing an impoverished girl entering The Square and being killed in an explosion. The video is published on the museum's website and YouTube channel after a distracted Christian gives his approval without viewing it.

The clip goes viral, quickly reaching 300,000 YouTube views, but receives an extremely hostile response from the media, religious leaders and the general public. The museum arranges a press conference, where Christian states he violated protocol and is stepping down as curator in mutual agreement with the board. Several journalists then attack him for stirring up cheap controversy with a tasteless clip, while others attack him for self-censorship because of his resignation.

Feeling guilty about wronging the boy, Christian drives to the apartment block several days later and tries to find him and his family. Christian talks to a neighbour who states that he knew the boy but that his family has moved away.

== Cast ==
- Claes Bang as Christian
- Elisabeth Moss as Anne
- Dominic West as Julian
- Terry Notary as Oleg
- Christopher Læssø as Michael
- Marina Schiptjenko as Elna
- Annica Liljeblad as Sonja
- Elijandro Edouard as Boy with Letter

== Production ==
=== Development ===
The Square is presented as a simple outline.

The story for the film was conceived when director Ruben Östlund and producer Kalle Boman entered an installation into the Vandalorum Museum in Värnamo in 2014. In their artists' statement, they wrote that "The Square is a sanctuary of trust and caring. Within it we all share equal rights and obligations." While working on the screenplay, Östlund visited numerous art galleries.

The beginning of the film was also inspired by a true incident, when in Gothenburg Östlund saw a woman run to a man, saying someone was going to kill her. Another man arrived and yelled. It turned out to be a ploy, in which Östlund's cellphone was stolen.

In one scene, a man with Tourette's syndrome yells at a public event. Östlund said this was inspired by a true incident at a Swedish theatre, and was depicted without fear of insensitivity, since he said all people are satirized in his work. In another scene, the character Oleg Rogozjin, a performance artist, entertains affluent patrons of the museum performing as an ape. The scene was inspired by a real incident where artist Oleg Kulik, who performs as a dog, had attacked people at an event in Stockholm. Östlund was considering modeling the character after GG Allin, but deciding that that would be too "extreme", he fell back on his interest in animal imitations. In crafting the scene, his concept was: "this internationally recognized artist is pretending to be a wild beast. What happens when he enters a room full of people in tuxedos?" Other artists parodied or referenced in the film include Julian Schnabel and Carl Hammoud.

Much of the art depicted was crafted for the film, with installations influenced by Robert Smithson, an authentic Garry Winogrand image, and another work by Östlund and Kalle Boman.

The budget was $5.5 million. Financial support was provided by the Swedish Film Institute, which awarded the project 11 million SEK, and the Danish Film Institute, which awarded 1 million DKK.

=== Casting ===
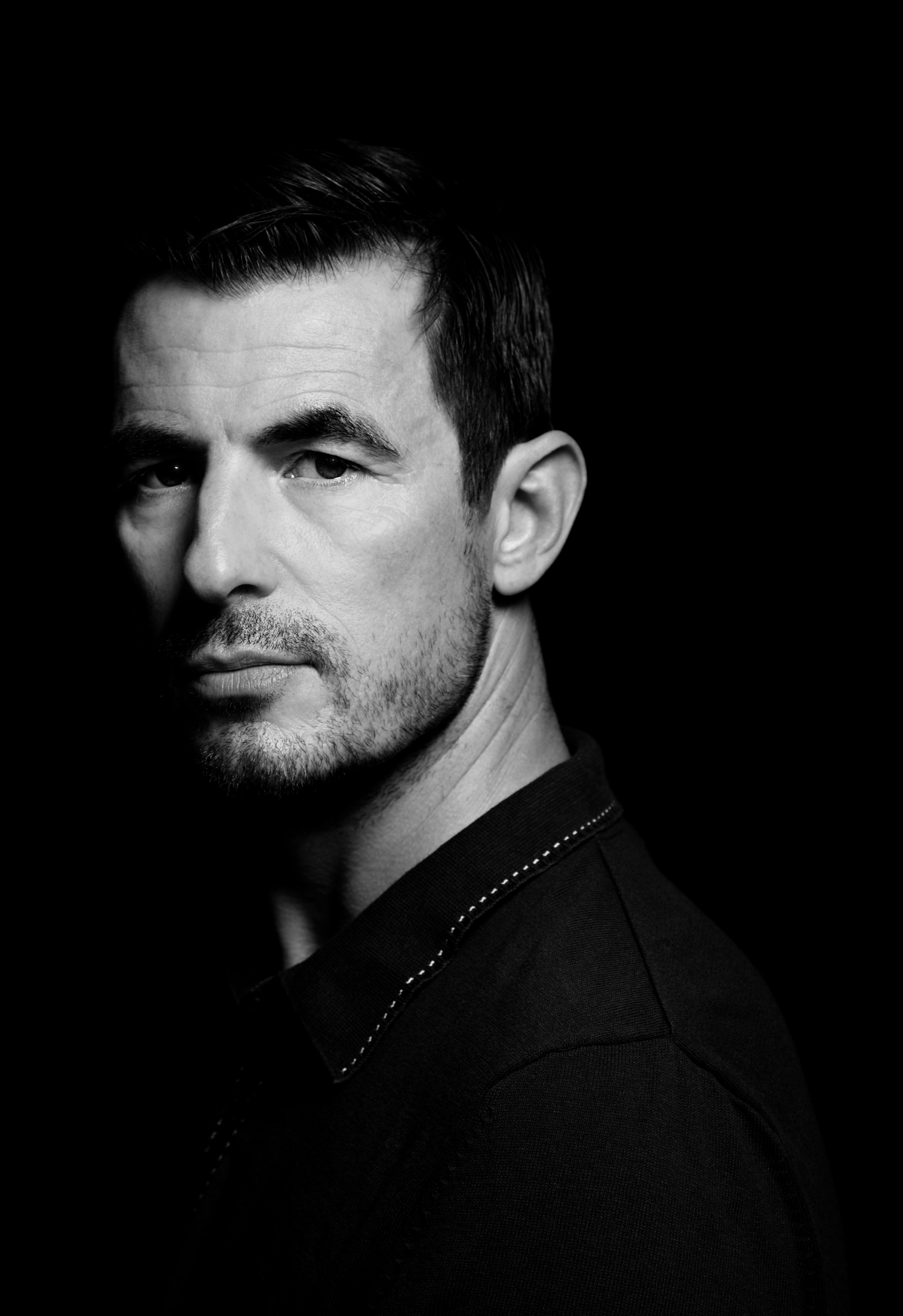
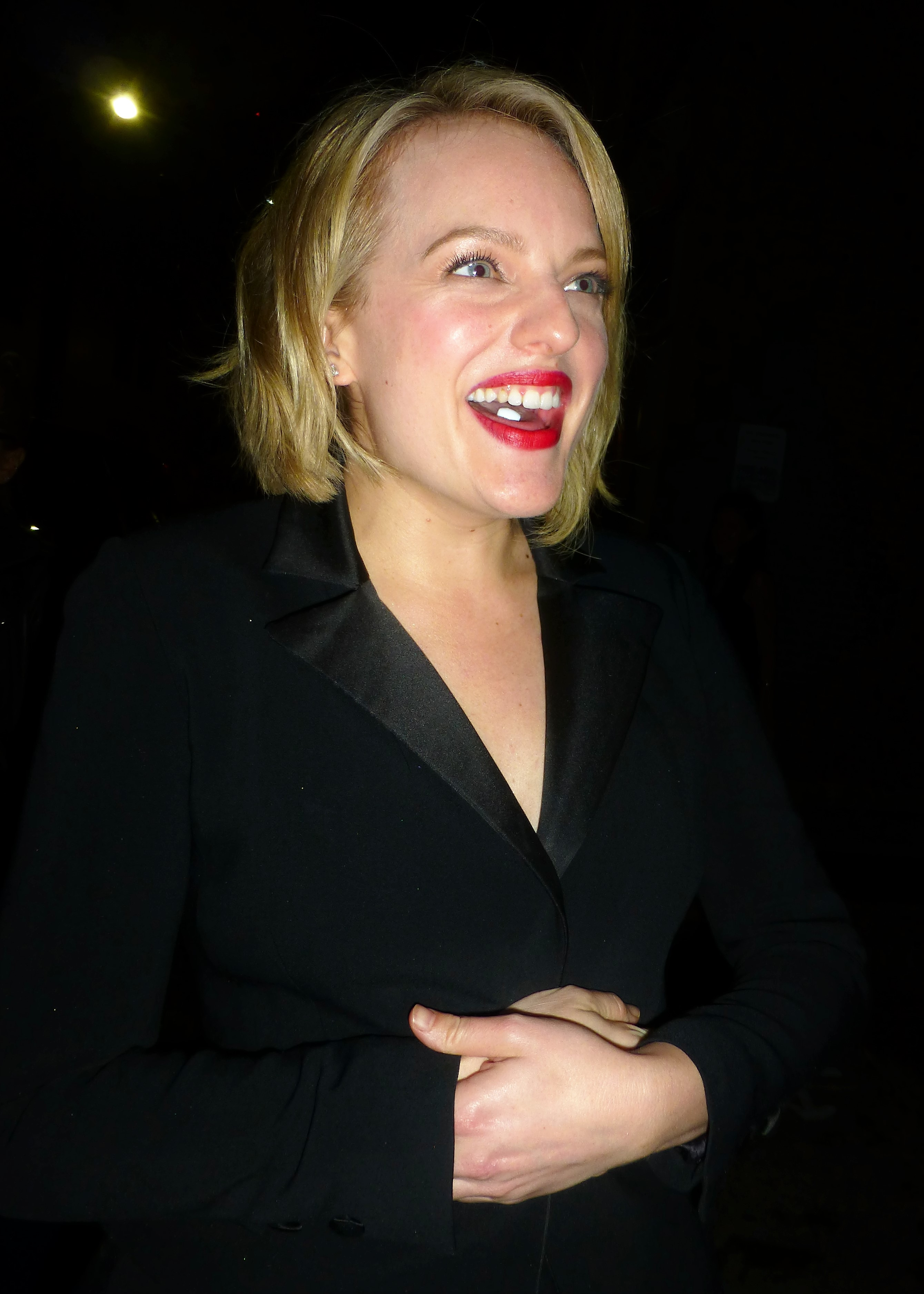
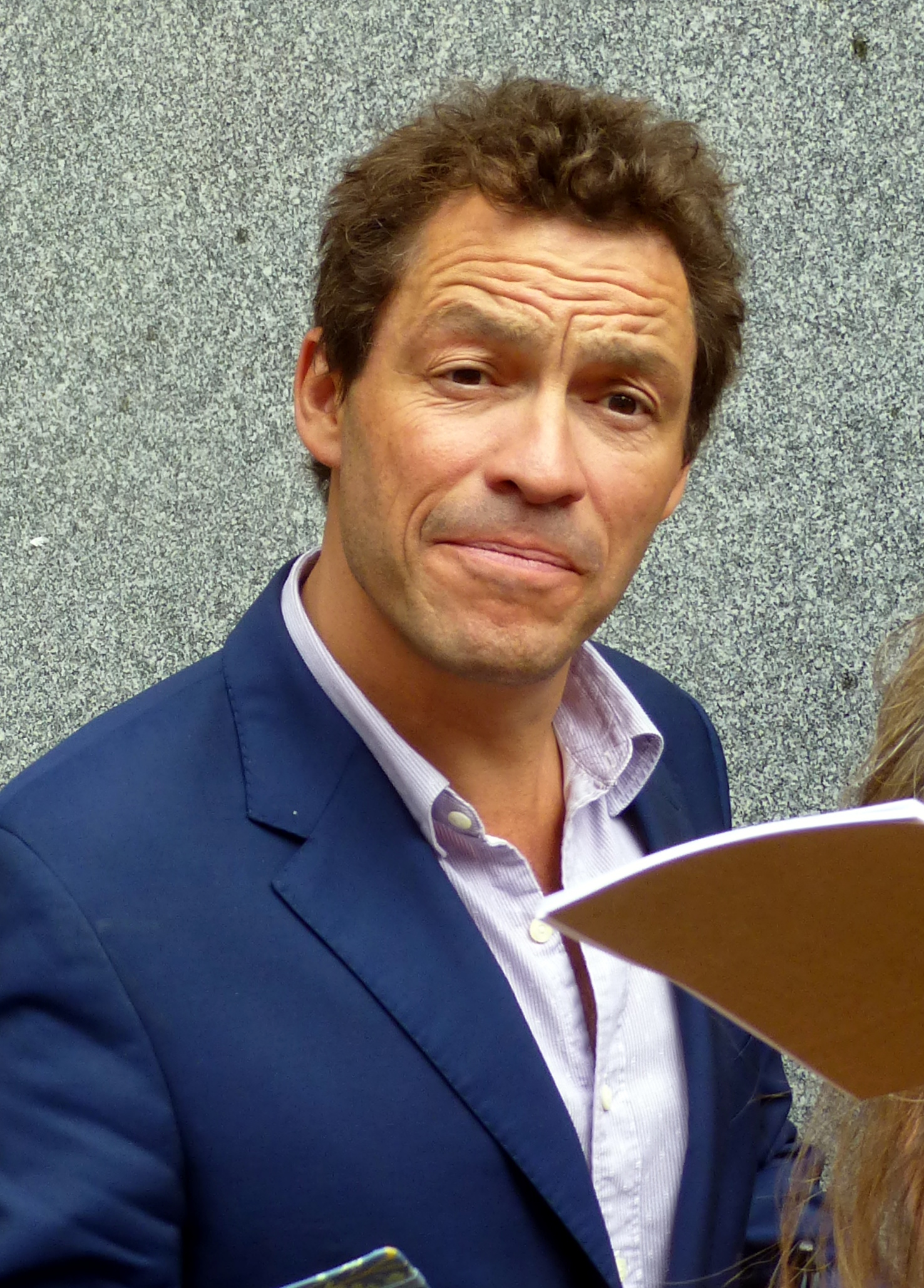
Claes Bang, Elisabeth Moss and Dominic West star.

Danish actor Claes Bang learned of the project through Tanja Grunwald, who was from Denmark and casting The Square. Bang attended three auditions, involving much improvisation. As preparation for the role of Christian, Bang made an in-depth interview with Daniel Birnbaum, the director of Moderna Museet in Stockholm. Bang kept contact with Birnbaum and sent him short videos of himself in the role of an art curator which Birnbaum provided feedback to. Birnbaum's fashion sense was also studied.

After assembling much of his cast in auditions around the Nordic countries, Östlund, mindful of William Morris Endeavor Entertainment's desire for him to make an English-language film, contacted BAFTA in London. This led to Elisabeth Moss and Dominic West joining the cast, although Östlund also held early conversations with Michelle Williams and Sacha Baron Cohen. Moss practised improvisation for two hours in order to secure her part. Östlund said it was challenging for Moss and West to adapt to Swedish direction, but they eventually adjusted.

Terry Notary, a U.S. actor who plays Oleg, a character who acts like an ape, was cast based on his experience with Planet of the Apes. Östlund discovered Notary after running a Google search for "actor imitating monkey" and viewing one of Notary's performances. For Notary's scene, 300 extras were also employed.

=== Filming ===
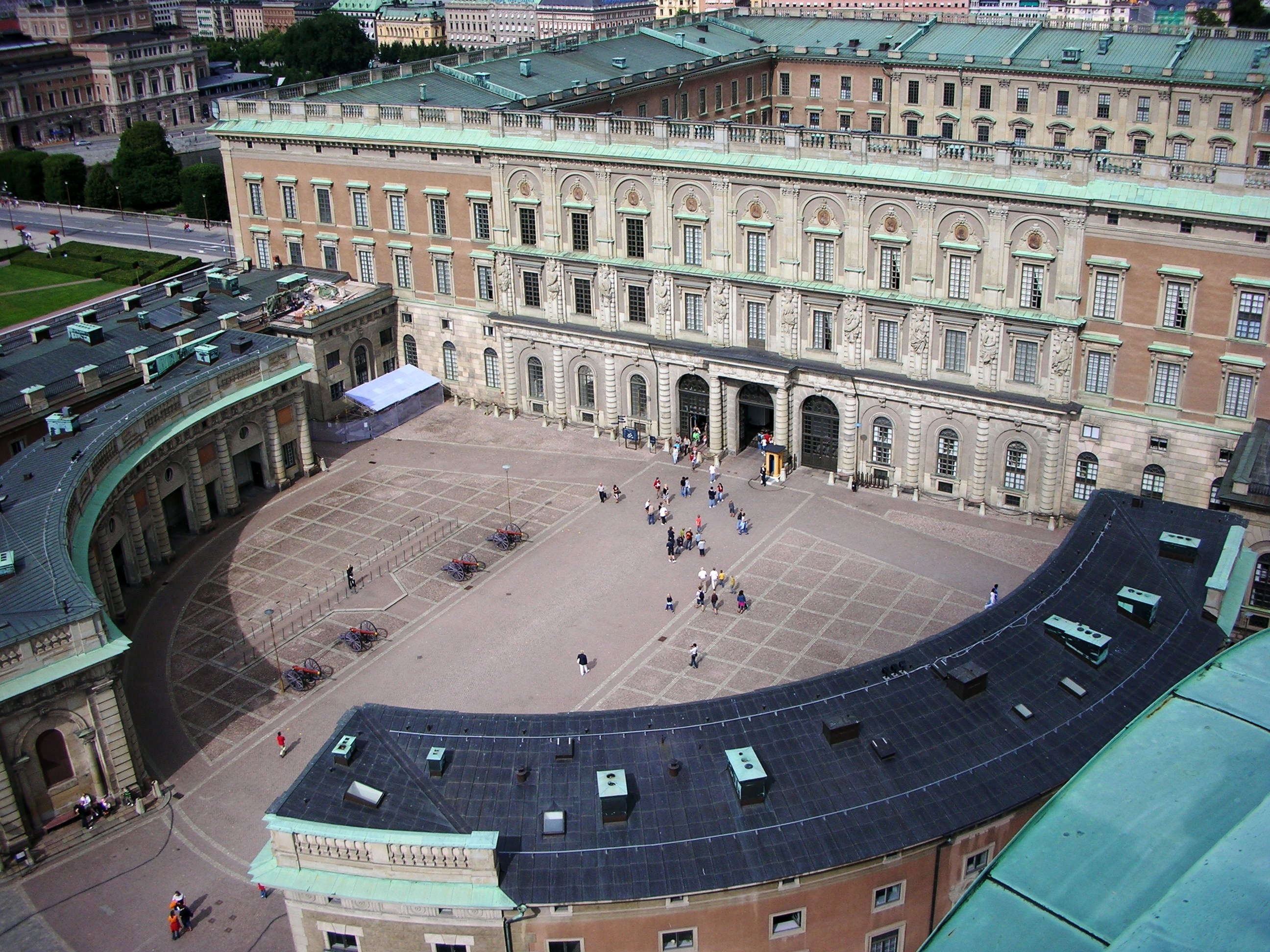
The gallery in the film is based on Sweden's Stockholm Palace.

Location scouting took place in Germany, France and Sweden in September and October 2015. Principal photography began on June 9, 2016 and finished on October 8, 2016 in Västra Götaland County/Gothenburg, Uppland/Stockholm and Brandenburg/Berlin. The gallery in the film is based on Stockholm Palace.

Östlund preferred to focus each day on a single scene, taking as many as 50 takes, though the most complex sequences required four days. In Berlin, one day was spent with a Bonobo, with the cast given rules on how to behave with the animal to prevent triggering a violent reaction.

== Release ==
The film was added to the 2017 Cannes Film Festival's schedule near the end of April, a late addition. This marked its international debut. It later went to the Sydney Film Festival in June, followed by the New Zealand International Film Festival in July. With the number of films at the Toronto International Film Festival being reduced from 2016, The Square was nevertheless selected for the 2017 festival in September. The U.S. debut took place at the Fantastic Fest in Austin, Texas in September 2017.

The larger theatrical release in Sweden by TriArt Film was scheduled for 25 August 2017. Before the film screened at Cannes, distribution rights were sold for releases in the United Kingdom, France, Germany and other European countries. Magnolia Pictures became the U.S. distributor, having previously worked with Östlund in distributing his Force Majeure (2014). A trailer was publicized in July. In the U.K., it was set to premiere at Somerset House, London on 16 August, but Curzon Artificial Eye decided to delay the wider British release planned for 25 August, for Östlund to edit the final cut.

For the general release of the film, Östlund cut 2 minutes and 43 seconds from the final quarter of the film (as presented at Cannes) to sharpen the last 30 minutes saying, "I sped it up a little."

== Reception ==
=== Box office ===
The Square grossed $1.5 million in the United States and Canada, and $7 million in other territories, for a worldwide total of $8.5 million.

=== Critical response ===
I'm interested in creating dilemmas for the characters in my films... situations where there are two or more opportunities and none of them are easy — Ruben Östlund

At Cannes, critical reception was largely positive, though it was not expected to win the Palme d'Or. Variety's Owen Gleiberman called the film "a suavely merciless take-down of the decadence of the contemporary art world," remarking the museum depicted is motivated by greed, and the film is "more outrageous but less effective than Force Majeure." Peter Bradshaw gave it four stars in The Guardian, judging it a "sprawling and daringly surreal satire". In The Hollywood Reporter, Todd McCarthy called it "madly ambitious and frequently disquieting", suggesting it might try to include too much, but had an impact.

Robbie Collin gave it four stars in The Daily Telegraph, finding the first hour cleverly satirical, and a later scene horrific. Conversely, IndieWire critic Eric Kohn was disappointed by its over-indulgence and lack of structure, calling it "a Pollock canvas of weird ideas tossed at the audience in search of a singular narrative, some of which stick better than others." Writing for Sight & Sound, Giovanni Marchini Camia argued that the film was overlong but that the dinner scene was "a veritable tour de force", which he suggested could have made a great short film.

Following Cannes, A.O. Scott found a familiar theme of "the bad conscience of the cultural elite", concluding that The Square was "ostentatiously smart, maybe too much so for its own good, but ultimately complacent, craven and clueless". Peter Travers gave it three stars, finding enjoyment and some influence from the Marx Brothers, and satire so effective that "it always hurts when you laugh". The New Yorker's Anthony Lane highlighted Notary as the reason to watch the film.

Glenn Kenny for RogerEbert.com wrote: "The conceptual-fish-in-a-barrel potshots at contemporary art alternate with an ostensible critique of masculinity and privilege, building to a climax that endorses a compassion that's mealy-mouthed and insufficient". Violet Lucca for Sight & Sound wrote: "Ostlund uses his setting to explore hidden inequalities in supposedly liberal societies, particularly those concerning masculinity, race and class, playing with our expectations about what is supposed to happen versus the results, which are always uncomfortable."

In The Village Voice, Bilge Ebiri commented the film was open to many different interpretations as to its point, and that it reflected contemporary society better than any other 2017 film. The Globe and Mail critic Barry Hertz wrote The Square is "a sharp art-world satire" before becoming "something egregiously bonkers". Paul Ennis wrote in NOW that it was "compulsively watchable". Vice reviewer Rod Bastanmehr hailed it as a timely satire taking aim at contemporary art patrons.

The Square has an approval rating of 85% on Rotten Tomatoes, based on 219 reviews, and an average rating of 7.5/10. The website's critical consensus reads: "The Square finds writer-director Ruben Östlund as ambitious as ever — and delivering an unforgettably unusual work whose challenging themes pay thought-provoking dividends." On Metacritic, the film has a score of 73 out of 100, based on 33 critics, indicating "generally favourable reviews".

=== Accolades ===
Östlund won the Palme d'Or for The Square, marking the first time a predominantly Swedish production received the honour since The Best Intentions (1992), and the first time a Swedish director won since Alf Sjöberg for Miss Julie (1951). Jury president Pedro Almodóvar cited it for depicting "the dictatorship of being politically correct". Juror Agnes Jaoui also commended it for its intelligence and wit. Set decorator Josefin Åsberg received the Vulcan Award of the Technical Artist at Cannes. In August, it was selected as the Swedish entry for the Best Foreign Language Film at the 90th Academy Awards; the Academy shortlisted it for a nomination in December. The Square also received the most nominations at the 30th European Film Awards.

Award	Date of ceremony	Category	Recipient(s)	Result	Ref(s)
Academy Awards	4 March 2018	Best Foreign Language Film	Ruben Östlund	Nominated	
Bodil Awards	March 2018	Best Non-American Film	Ruben Östlund	Won	
Boston Society of Film Critics	10 December 2017	Best Foreign Language Film	Ruben Östlund	Won	
British Independent Film Awards	10 December 2017	Best Foreign Independent Film	Ruben Östlund	Nominated	
Cannes Film Festival	28 May 2017	Palme d'Or	Ruben Östlund	Won	
Cannes Film Festival	28 May 2017	Vulcan Award	Josefin Åsberg	Won	
Chicago Film Critics Association	12 December 2017	Best Foreign Language Film	Ruben Östlund	Won	
César Awards	2 March 2018	Best Foreign Film	Ruben Östlund	Nominated	
Critics' Choice Movie Awards	11 January 2018	Best Foreign Language Film	Ruben Östlund	Nominated	
Dallas-Fort Worth Film Critics Association	13 December 2017	Best Foreign Language Film	Ruben Östlund	Won	
European Film Awards	9 December 2017	Best Film	Ruben Östlund	Won	
European Film Awards	9 December 2017	Best Comedy	Ruben Östlund	Won	
European Film Awards	9 December 2017	Best Director	Ruben Östlund	Won	
European Film Awards	9 December 2017	Best Screenwriter	Ruben Östlund	Won	
European Film Awards	9 December 2017	Best Actor	Claes Bang	Won	
European Film Awards	9 December 2017	Best Production Designer	Josefin Åsberg	Won	
Fantastic Fest	September 2017	Best Comedy Feature	Ruben Östlund	Won	
Golden Globes	7 January 2018	Best Foreign Language Film	Ruben Östlund	Nominated	
Goya Awards	3 February 2018	Best European Film	Ruben Östlund	Won	
Grande Prêmio do Cinema Brasileiro	14 August 2019	Best Foreign Feature Film	Ruben Östlund	Nominated	
Guldbagge Awards	22 January 2018	Best Film	Erik Hemmendorff and Philippe Bober	Nominated	
Guldbagge Awards	22 January 2018	Best Director	Ruben Östlund	Won	
Guldbagge Awards	22 January 2018	Best Actor in a Leading Role	Claes Bang	Nominated	
Guldbagge Awards	22 January 2018	Best Screenplay	Ruben Östlund	Nominated	
Guldbagge Awards	22 January 2018	Best Cinematography	Fredrik Wenzel	Won	
Guldbagge Awards	22 January 2018	Best Art Direction	Josefin Åsberg	Nominated	
National Board of Review	28 November 2017	Top Five Foreign Language Films	Ruben Östlund	Won	
Online Film Critics Society	28 December 2017	Best Foreign Language Film	Ruben Östlund	Nominated	
San Diego Film Critics Society	11 December 2017	Best Foreign Language Film	Ruben Östlund	Nominated	
Satellite Awards	11 February 2018	Best Foreign Language Film	Ruben Östlund	Nominated	
Saturn Awards	27 June 2018	Best International Film	Ruben Östlund	Nominated	
Toronto Film Critics Association	10 December 2017	Best Foreign Language Film	Ruben Östlund	Won	
Vancouver Film Critics Circle	18 December 2017	Best Foreign Language Film	Ruben Östlund	Nominated	
Washington DC Area Film Critics Association	8 December 2017	Best Foreign Language Film	Ruben Östlund	Nominated	
Women's Image Network Awards	February 2018	Best Foreign Language Film	Ruben Östlund	Nominated	

== See also ==
- List of submissions to the 90th Academy Awards for Best Foreign Language Film
- List of Swedish submissions for the Academy Award for Best Foreign Language Film
