= Ann-Sofie Kylin =

Swedish actress

- Born: 14 November 1955 (age 70); Stockholm, Sweden
- Occupation: Actress
- Years active: 1970-present

Ann-Sofie Kylin (born 14 November 1955) is a Swedish actress. She starred in the 1970 film A Swedish Love Story.

== Selected filmography ==
- A Swedish Love Story (1970)
- De hemligas ö (as Fia, 6 episodes)
- Gräsänklingar (as Anki, uncredited)
