= The Guitar Mongoloid =

2004 film by Ruben Östlund

- Theatrical release poster
- Directed by: Ruben Östlund
- Written by: Ruben Östlund
- Produced by: Anna Sohlman; Kalle Boman
- Cinematography: Tibor Gent
- Edited by: Harry Lewinsson
- Distributed by: Triangelfilm AB
- Release date: 1 October 2004
- Running time: 89 minutes
- Country: Sweden
- Language: Swedish

The Guitar Mongoloid (Swedish: Gitarrmongot) is a 2004 Swedish drama film written and directed by Ruben Östlund, about different people living outside the norms in the fictional city Jöteborg, strikingly similar to real-life Gothenburg. Although not a documentary, most of the people seen in the film are non-actors more or less playing themselves.

== Cast ==
- Erik Rutström as Erik
- Ola Sandstig as Ola
- Britt-Marie Andersson as neurotic woman
- Julia Persdotter as Ola's girlfriend
- P-A Emanuelsson
- Anna Johansson
- Mikael Allu
- Bjarne Gunnarsson
- Pär Berg
- David Olandersson

== Reception ==
The film was met by mixed but overall positive reviews, with a rating of 3.6 out of 5 based on eight reviews at the Swedish-language review aggregator website Kritiker.se. Carl-Johan Malmberg at Svenska Dagbladet gave it 5 out of 6 and called it "a series of sabotages: against our expectations, against good taste, as well as against the boredom of the normal Swedish film with its moderately thoughtful, moderately funny, moderately empathetic, and quickly forgotten stories." Jens Peterson at Aftonbladet was less enthusiastic and rated the film 2 out of 5, summarising it as "Jackass without heart, Candid Camera without humour." The film was honored with the FIPRESCI Award at the 27th Moscow International Film Festival.
