= Carl Hammoud =

Swedish artist

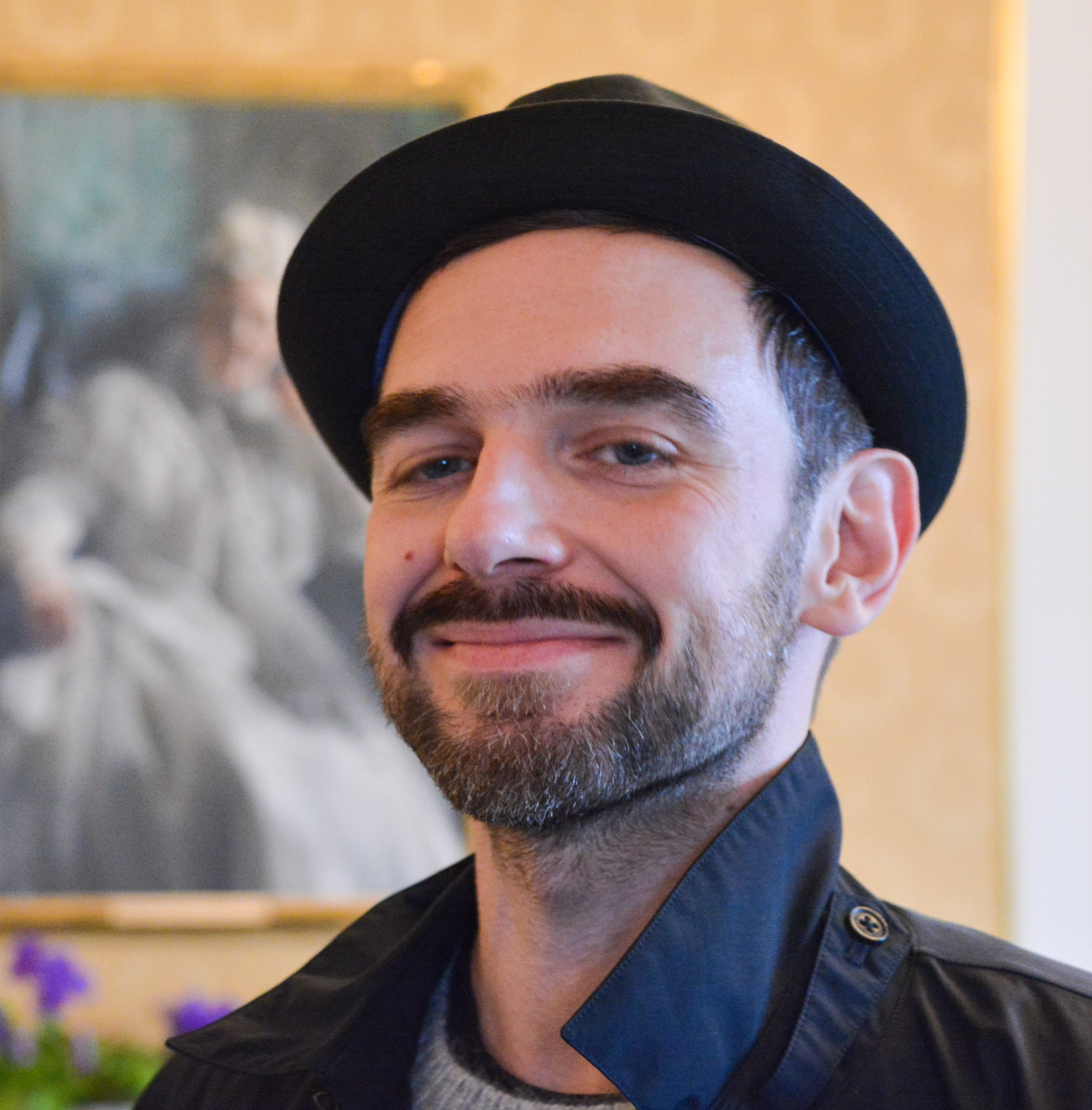
Hammoud in 2015

Carl Hammoud (born 3 April 1976) is a Swedish artist. He was educated at the Valand Academy in Gothenburg and primarily works as a painter. Many of his paintings depict sterile interior environments such as offices and libraries, which are given a timeless and sometimes fantastical quality.

In 2012 he received Åke Andréns konstnärsstipendium, which with a prize sum of 500,000 kronor is Sweden's most valuable art prize.

His paintings of piles of chairs inspired an installation piece in the 2017 film The Square, which satirizes the art world.
