= A Pigeon Sat on a Branch Reflecting on Existence =

2014 film by Roy Andersson

- Swedish film poster
- Directed by: Roy Andersson
- Written by: Roy Andersson
- Produced by: Linn Kirkenær; Pernilla Sandström; Håkon Øverås; Philippe Bober
- Starring: Holger Andersson; Nils Westblom; Charlotta Larsson; Viktor Gyllenberg; Lotti Tornros; Jonas Gerholm; Ola Stensson; Oscar Salomonsson; Roger Olsen Likvern
- Cinematography: István Borbás; Gergely Pálos
- Edited by: Alexandra Strauss
- Production company: Roy Andersson Filmproduktion AB Coproduction Office
- Distributed by: TriArt Film (Sweden)
- Release dates: 2 September 2014 (Venice); 14 November 2014 (Sweden)
- Running time: 101 minutes
- Countries: Sweden; Norway; France; Germany; Denmark
- Language: Swedish
- Box office: $5.8 million

A Pigeon Sat on a Branch Reflecting on Existence (Swedish: En duva satt på en gren och funderade på tillvaron) is a 2014 internationally co-produced black comedy-drama film written and directed by Roy Andersson. It is the third installment in his "Living" trilogy, following Songs from the Second Floor (2000) and You, the Living (2007). It premiered at the 71st Venice International Film Festival where it was awarded the Golden Lion for Best Film. It was selected as the Swedish entry for the Best Foreign Language Film at the 88th Academy Awards but it was not nominated. It was released in Sweden on 14 November 2014, by TriArt Film.

Its title is a reference to the 1565 painting The Hunters in the Snow by Pieter Bruegel the Elder. The painting depicts a rural wintertime scene, with some birds perched on tree branches. Andersson said he imagined that the birds in the scene are watching the people below, wondering what they are doing. He explained the title of the film as a "different way of saying 'what are we actually doing', that's what the movie is about." At the Venice Film Festival, Andersson said that the film had been inspired by the 1948 Italian film Bicycle Thieves by Vittorio De Sica.

== Plot ==
The slow cinema movie, hyper reality, consists of a series of mostly self-contained tableaux, sometimes connected by recurring themes or characters. The story loosely follows two travelling novelty salesmen, Jonathan and Sam, who live in a desolate flophouse, and their unsuccessful attempts to win customers for their joke articles (vampire teeth, laughing bags and a monster mask). Although there is no main storyline in the traditional sense, all scenes are connected.

== Cast ==
- Holger Andersson as Jonathan
- Nils Westblom as Sam

== Reception ==
A Pigeon Sat on a Branch Reflecting on Existence received an 89% rating on Rotten Tomatoes, based on 102 reviews, with an average rating of 7.9/10. The consensus reads: "Expertly assembled and indelibly original, A Pigeon Sat on a Branch concludes writer-director Roy Andersson's Living trilogy in style." The film also received a score of 81 out of 100 on Metacritic, based on 23 reviews. Audiences surveyed by CinemaScore gave the film an average grade of "A–" on an A+ to F scale.

== See also ==
- List of submissions to the 88th Academy Awards for Best Foreign Language Film
- List of Swedish submissions for the Academy Award for Best Foreign Language Film
