= World of Glory =

- Directed by: Roy Andersson
- Written by: Roy Andersson
- Produced by: Göran Lindström; Freddy Olsson
- Starring: Klas Gösta Olsson
- Cinematography: István Borbás
- Music by: Björn Isfält
- Release dates: January 1991 (Gothenburg Film Festival); 8 November 1991
- Running time: 14 minutes
- Country: Sweden
- Language: Swedish
- Budget: 4 million kr

World of Glory is a 1991 Swedish short film written and directed by Roy Andersson. Its original Swedish title is Härlig är jorden, which means "Lovely is the Earth", and is the Swedish title of the hymn "Fairest Lord Jesus". The narrative portrays a man in white make-up who guides the viewer through his life in a bleakly stylised world, beginning with a scene with soldiers loading nude adults and children into a gas van for execution. The film was Andersson's critical comeback to cinema, after many years in advertising.

== Production ==
In 1975, Andersson's critical and commercial failure Giliap had forced him to disappear from the cinema scene and instead work as a director of advertisements. Several of his commercials eventually gained critical acclaim for their idiosyncratic style. Andersson said it was the Polish director Krzysztof Kieślowski who finally made him regain faith in cinema and return to filmmaking. World of Glory was commissioned by the Gothenburg Film Festival as an entry for a short-film series called 90 minuter 90-tal ("90 minutes 90s"). The budget was four million kronor.
