= Safari (2016 film) =

2016 film directed by Ulrich Seidl

- Directed by: Ulrich Seidl
- Written by: Ulrich Seidl; Veronika Franz
- Produced by: Ulrich Seidl; Sigrid Dyekjær
- Cinematography: Wolfgang Thaler
- Edited by: Christof Schertenleib
- Release date: 3 September 2016 (Venice Film Festival)
- Countries: Austria; Denmark
- Language: German

Safari is a 2016 Austrian-Danish documentary film co-written and directed by Ulrich Seidl. It premiered out of competition at the 73rd edition of the Venice Film Festival, and was later screened at the 41st Toronto International Film Festival. It is an explicit portrayal of the tourist hunting in Africa.
