= About Endlessness =

2019 film

- Film poster
- Swedish: Om det oändliga
- Directed by: Roy Andersson
- Written by: Roy Andersson
- Produced by: Pernilla Sandström; Johan Carlsson
- Starring: Conny Block; Jessica Louthander; Martin Serner
- Cinematography: Gergely Pálos
- Release date: 3 September 2019 (Venice)
- Running time: 78 minutes
- Countries: Sweden; Germany; Norway
- Language: Swedish
- Box office: $403,455

About Endlessness (Swedish: Om det oändliga) is a 2019 Swedish drama film directed by Roy Andersson. It was selected to compete for the Golden Lion at the 76th Venice International Film Festival. At the Venice Film Festival, the film won the Silver Lion for Best Direction.

== Summary ==
The film consists of a series of vignettes that are often narrated to provide further context. The vignettes are shown in the following order.

1. A man and woman sit on a park bench overlooking a nearby city with a flock of geese flying overhead; the woman comments that it is September.
2. A man directly addresses the audience to share an encounter he had with a former classmate, Sverker Olsson, whom he wronged in the past. He tries to greet Sverker but is ignored.
3. A waiter at a fancy restaurant absentmindedly overfills his customer's glass, spilling wine onto the table.
4. A woman, described by the narrator as incapable of feeling shame, turns and looks back at the camera with an annoyed expression.
5. A man checks inside of his mattress for his life savings that he keeps there, as he does not trust banks.
6. A priest (who is featured prominently throughout the film) has a vivid nightmare of being crucified, and his wife helps to calm him down to go back to sleep.
7. As a hair salon employee waters a tree outside, a lovelorn young man watches her from a distance until she returns inside.
8. The priest visits Dr. Lindh, who dismisses his dreams as simple nightmares. The priest expresses his ever-growing doubt about God, and the doctor suggests that God does not exist. He tells the priest to meet him next week.
9. A legless busker in a subway station plays "'O sole mio" on a mandolin.
10. A man plays with his infant child outside a building as his wife watches and the child's grandmother takes pictures.
11. The priest, still troubled over his recurring nightmares, gets drunk on sacramental wine and asks God why he has been forsaken. He stumbles back to his congregation to distribute the Eucharist.
12. Two parents leave flowers on the grave of their son, who died in a war.
13. Two lovers float over Cologne, in ruins after a series of bombing raids by the Allies throughout World War II.
14. A young woman gets off at a train station and finds nobody waiting for her. Her husband then hurriedly arrives, crosses under the tracks, and helps take her luggage as they leave.
15. A man sits with a woman who loves champagne while Billie Holiday sings in the background.
16. A woman sits alone at a diner as a man carrying flowers enters and asks if her name is Lisa Larsson. She tells him it isn't as her husband returns with two beers. The man leaves.
17. A captured soldier is tied to a post by the enemy army, despite his desperate pleas (in English). The scene ends before he is presumably executed by firing squad.
18. Three young women pass by a café playing "Tre Trallande Jäntor" by the Delta Rhythm Boys. The three dance to the song in front of the café's customers, entertaining them.
19. A woman at a train station with her baby breaks the heel of her shoe, forcing her to place them underneath her baby's stroller and continue barefoot.
20. A man cradles his daughter, whom he has just stabbed to death. The narrator says he wanted to protect his family's honor but now feels sorry about it.
21. A jealous husband sees his wife speaking to another man at an open market and confronts her, accusing her of having an affair. As he begins slapping her, several bystanders attempt to restrain him and get him to calm down. The man says that he loves her, and she says she knows.
22. A young man discusses the first law of thermodynamics about how all matter and energy can never be destroyed, only changed, and that because of it, everyone's energies are never-ending.
23. Adolf Hitler and Martin Bormann enter a room in their underground bunker where three drunk Nazi generals sit as their military is defeated by the Allied forces above them.
24. A man openly weeps on a crowded bus, lamenting that he doesn't know what he wants. A passenger criticizes his public display of emotion.
25. A man and his young daughter stop in the pouring rain on their way to a birthday party so he can tie her shoes.
26. The priest confronts Dr. Lindh at his clinic at closing time. He repeatedly begs the doctor and his assistant to help him find purpose after losing his faith, but they turn him down and eject him from their office, where he waits and continues to cry for their help.
27. A dentist sees a patient about a toothache. When the patient rejects anesthesia due to his hatred of needles, the dentist attempts to work on the tooth regardless. The patient's repeated yells of pain prompt the doctor to leave, fed up. The dentist's assistant says that the dentist is in a bad mood because he has problems.
28. The same dentist has a drink at a nearby bar as snow gently falls outside and "Silent Night" plays in the background. Another patron repeatedly declares that everything is fantastic.
29. An army defeated and then captured is being marched to a prison camp in Siberia.
30. The man from the second vignette recounts a second identical encounter that he had with Sverker. He also learns that, despite lackluster grades at school, Sverker managed to get his PhD degree, making the man reflect on how little he has accomplished. His wife reminds him of their many travels together, but he continues to dwell on Sverker's successes.
31. A man's car breaks down on a country road, and he attempts to fix it himself with no success.

== Cast ==
- Conny Block as Sverker Ohlsson
- Jessica Louthander as The Narrator
- Martin Serner as The Priest
- Lesley Leichtweis Bernardi as The lady in the train station
- Ania Nova (as Anna Sedunova) as The girl on the train
- Tatiana Delaunay as The Flying Woman
- Anders Hellström as The Flying Man
- Magnus Wallgren as Adolf Hitler
- Pablo Fernandez-Moreno as The Man who has killed his daughter
- Bengt Bergius as Psychiatrist
- Karin Engman as The Mother
- Roger Hanning as Martin Bormann
- Jan-Eje Ferling as The Man in the Stairs
- Thore Flygel as The Dentist
- Anton Forsdik as Sibling 1
- Fanny Forsdik as Sibling 2
- Amanda Davies as Student

== Reception ==
About Endlessness received positive reviews from critics. As of October 2021, 94% of the 102 reviews compiled on Rotten Tomatoes are positive, with an average rating of 8.1/10. The site's critical consensus reads, "About Endlessness sees writer-director Roy Andersson surveying the human condition with equal parts striking clarity, tenderness, and deadpan existential wit." On Metacritic, it has an average score of 87/100, based on thirty critic reviews, indicating "universal acclaim".
