= Ruben Östlund =

Swedish filmmaker (born 1974)

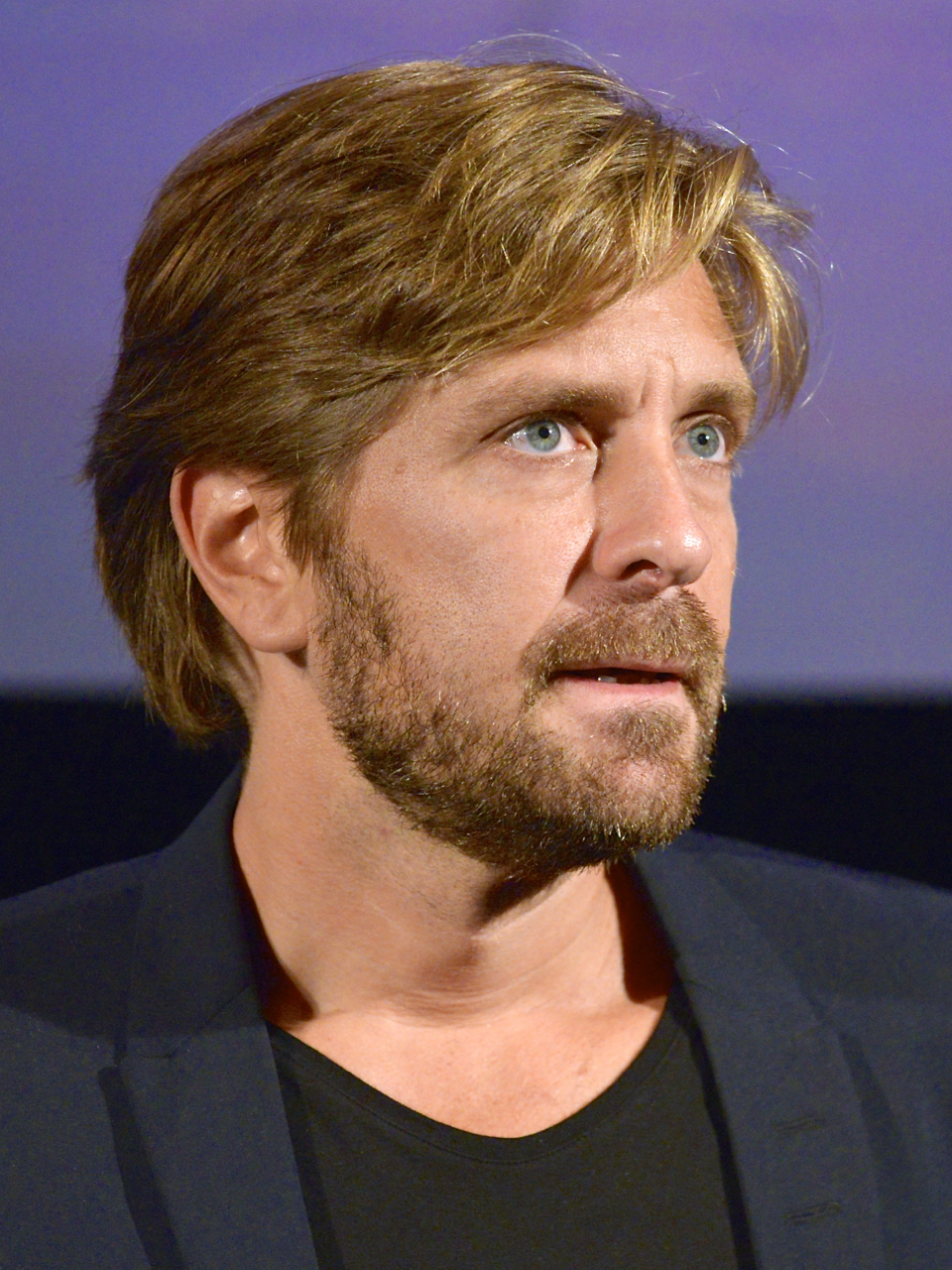
- Ruben Östlund in 2014
- Born: 14 April 1974 (age 52); Styrsö, Sweden
- Education: University of Gothenburg
- Occupation: Filmmaker
- Years active: 1993–present
- Notable work: Force Majeure, The Square, Triangle of Sadness
- Spouse(s): Andrea Östlund (?–2007), Sina Görcz (2014–present)
- Children: 3
- Awards: Palme d'Or (2017, 2022); Guldbaggen (2023)
- Honours: H. M. The King's Medal in Gold

Ruben Östlund (Swedish pronunciation: [ˈrʉːbɛn ˈœstlɵnd]) (born 14 April 1974) is a Swedish filmmaker best known for his satirical black comedy films Force Majeure (2014), The Square (2017) and Triangle of Sadness (2022). He is the recipient of various accolades, including two Palmes d'Or, four European Film Awards and nominations for three Academy Awards.

== Early life and education ==
Östlund was born Claes Olle Ruben Östlund in Styrsö, Gothenburg Municipality, Sweden. After high school, he started working in various ski resorts in the Alps during the winter seasons. There he began making skiing videos for his friends, which helped him get a job at a local production company.

He went on to study at the Gothenburg film school, graduating in 2001. He was accepted to the school based on his skiing films. Together with film producer Erik Hemmendorff, he co-founded the production company Plattform Produktion, which produces his films.

== Career ==
=== 2000–2011 ===
His first three feature-length fiction films were The Guitar Mongoloid (2004), Involuntary (2008) and Play (2011). The Guitar Mongoloid won the FIPRESCI Award at the 27th Moscow International Film Festival. Östlund's short film Incident by a Bank won the Golden Bear for Best Short Film at the 60th Berlin International Film Festival and the Grand Prix at Tampere Film Festival in 2011.

=== 2014–present ===
In 2014, his film Force Majeure was selected to compete in the Un Certain Regard section at the Cannes Film Festival, winning the Jury Prize. Sweden then submitted Force Majeure for the Academy Award for Best Foreign Language Film. After the Academy shortlisted but did not nominate it, Östlund released a humorous video of his response to the snub. In 2016, he was a member of the jury for the Un Certain Regard section at Cannes.

In 2017, his film The Square, loosely inspired by some of his own experiences and art installation with Kalle Boman, won the Palme d'Or at the Cannes Film Festival. Alissa Wilkinson of Vox remarked that the film "at times feels more like longform performance art than a narrative film."

In 2020, he received the King's medal in gold for significant contributions to Swedish film.

His next project was Triangle of Sadness, a satirical film about the wealthy elite, which won him his second Palme d'Or in 2022, Best Director at the Guldbaggens gala, and won five other nominations. Triangle of Sadness received Academy Award nominations for Best Picture, Best Director, and Best Original Screenplay.

Östlund was the Jury president of the 2023 Cannes Film Festival.

== Personal life ==
Östlund has been in a relationship since 2014 with fashion photographer Sina Görcz, with whom he has a son. Until their divorce in 2008, he was married to his director colleague Andrea Östlund. They had twin daughters, born when he was working on The Guitar Mongoloid at the age of 28.

== Filmography ==
Short film

Year	English title	Original title	Notes
2005	Autobiographical Scene Number 6882	Scen nr: 6882 ur mitt liv	
2009	Incident by a Bank	Händelse vid bank	Short Film Golden Bear at the 60th Berlin International Film Festival

Feature film

Year	English title	Original title	Notes
2004	The Guitar Mongoloid	Gitarrmongot	
2008	Involuntary	De ofrivilliga	
2011	Play		
2014	Force Majeure	Turist	Jury Prize of the Un Certain Regard section at the 2014 Cannes Film Festival
2017	The Square		Palme d'Or at the 2017 Cannes Film Festival
2022	Triangle of Sadness		Palme d'Or at the 2022 Cannes Film Festival; English-language debut
2027	The Entertainment System Is Down		Post-production

Other films

Year	English title	Original title	Notes
1993	Addicted		Skiing film
1997	Free Radicals		Skiing film
1998	Free Radicals 2		Skiing film
2000	Låt dom andra sköta kärleken		Documentary
2002	Family Again	Familj igen	Documentary

== Awards and nominations ==
=== Academy Awards ===
Year	Category	Nominated work	Result
2018	Best International Feature Film	The Square	Nominated
2023	Best Director	Triangle of Sadness	Nominated
2023	Best Original Screenplay	Triangle of Sadness	Nominated

=== BAFTA Awards ===
Year	Category	Nominated work	Result
2015	Best Film Not in the English Language	Force Majeure	Nominated
2023	Best Original Screenplay	Triangle of Sadness	Nominated

=== Cannes Film Festival ===
Year	Category	Nominated work	Result
2008	Un Certain Regard	Involuntary	Nominated
2014	Un Certain Regard	Force Majeure	Nominated
2017	Palme d'Or	The Square	Won
2022	Palme d'Or	Triangle of Sadness	Won

=== Golden Globe Awards ===
Year	Category	Nominated work	Result
2015	Best Motion Picture – Foreign Language	Force Majeure	Nominated
2018	Best Motion Picture – Foreign Language	The Square	Nominated
2023	Best Motion Picture – Musical or Comedy	Triangle of Sadness	Nominated
