= Giliap =

- Swedish DVD cover
- Directed by: Roy Andersson
- Written by: Roy Andersson
- Produced by: Kalle Boman; Göran Lindgren
- Starring: Thommy Berggren; Mona Seilitz; Willie Andréason
- Music by: Björn Isfält
- Release date: 16 November 1975
- Running time: 137 minutes
- Country: Sweden
- Language: Swedish

Giliap is a 1975 Swedish drama film directed by Roy Andersson, starring Thommy Berggren as a man who takes a job as a waiter at a hotel. It was a financial and critical failure, and it led to Andersson's not making another feature film for 25 years. Andersson admitted that the film contains flaws, and he said that the main reason for them was that he was not completely in control of the production, and therefore he had to compromise in several scenes. He also suggested that the audience was not ready for the film, expecting it to be more similar to his previous film A Swedish Love Story: "I think they didn't understand what I was doing. Later, when Kubrick came out with Barry Lyndon, people accepted that – it's the same mood. But these things take time."

== Plot ==
A man arrives in an unidentified Swedish port city to work as a waiter at the Hotel Busarewski (a play on the Swedish word buse, "crook"). He is installed in a small room and soon begins to serve customers under the supervision of a strict, wheelchair-using manager suffering from an exaggerated self image.

The man befriends two co-workers: the talkative Gustav "The Count" Svensson and the beautiful waitress Anna. Anna says that she is only there working temporarily, just like the man himself, and that she will soon move on to work at a seaside hotel.

After work one day Anna takes the man to her borrowed apartment and tries to persuade him to go away with her somewhere. She tries to hug him but he is reluctant and returns to his room. There The Count visits him and reveals a plan he has that would bring them both lots of money. But in order to realize it they will first have to free a friend of The Count who happens to be in jail. The Count gives the man the code name "Giliap" to use during the operation.

Later Anna tries to have a talk with Giliap about feelings. She thinks he is mysterious, but Giliap claims that his secret is that he doesn't have any secrets. Anna says that she fears that he is going to take all her feelings and then just disappear.

The rescue operation for The Count's friend fails because of poor preparation and ends in confusion. After fleeing, The Count becomes seriously ill, and lying in his bed surrounded by colleagues he asks for Anna - who is at first reluctant but eventually appears, to The Count's satisfaction.

Later Giliap has bought a flower bouquet for Anna, but arriving at her apartment he is greeted by The Count who tells him she has left for that seaside hotel. Giliap goes there, finds her and embraces her. She starts to cry and they share dinner in a room she is sharing with another girl working at the same hotel.

The Count arrives at the seaside hotel and asks for whiskey. In the morning Anna once again tries to persuade Giliap to go away with her, before leaving for work. Outside she runs into The Count, who shows her lots of money, but she dismisses him. He then brings out a gun and shoots her.

Giliap and Anna's roommate walk out and find the money scattered all over the beach and start to collect it, before discovering Anna's body in the sand. Afterwards Giliap joins Anna's roommate on a train station platform, but she leaves tearfully as Giliap awaits his next journey alone.

== Cast ==
- Thommy Berggren as "Giliap"
- Mona Seilitz as Anna Gustavsson
- Willie Andréason as Gustav Svensson, "The Count"
- Lars-Levi Læstadius as Kreip
- Henry Olhans as "The Vulture"
- Rainer Mieth as Fat chef
- Julie Bernby as Singer
- Arne Leif Nielsen as Simonsson
- Pernilla August as Girl at Summer Hotel

== Reception ==
The reviews were very negative with almost no exception, calling it pretentious, old fashioned and reactionary on the level of a high school student caught up in French films from the 30s. Sverker Andréason wrote in the Swedish magazine Chaplin: "These people are evasively walking around each other, saying curious things of the type 'we are destruction people' and 'we live like migratory birds' and in the end I get the impression that Roy Andersson has got his whole philosophy of life from some film club that has gone through the dark French pre-war cinema with him, you know the one in which Jean Gabin always got shot right on the final step towards liberation."

After the initial reviews, the film gained some recognition, both in Sweden and abroad. In Expressen, Lars Forssell, a member of the Swedish Academy, urged everybody to see it, arguing that this film should be viewed in the same way a poetry collection by Göran Sonnevi should be read, and further comparing the atmosphere to the poetry of Gustaf Fröding.

== In popular culture ==
In Killinggänget's 1996 comedy series Percy tårar one of the sketches involves an archetypical Swedish cinéaste, speaking unfavourably about Ingmar Bergman's Fanny and Alexander and claiming Giliap to be the only decent Swedish film from the last 25 years.
