= A Swedish Love Story =

- Swedish: En kärlekshistoria
- Directed by: Roy Andersson
- Written by: Roy Andersson
- Produced by: Ejnar Gunnerholm
- Starring: Ann-Sofie Kylin; Rolf Sohlman
- Cinematography: Jörgen Persson
- Edited by: Kalle Boman
- Music by: Björn Isfält; Jan Bandel
- Release date: 24 April 1970
- Running time: 115 minutes
- Country: Sweden
- Language: Swedish

A Swedish Love Story (Swedish: En kärlekshistoria, lit. 'A Love Story') is a 1970 Swedish romantic drama directed by Roy Andersson, starring Ann-Sofie Kylin and Rolf Sohlman as two teenagers falling in love. Inspired by the Czechoslovak New Wave, the film was Andersson's feature film debut and was successful in Sweden and abroad.

The film was selected as the Swedish entry for the Best Foreign Language Film at the 43rd Academy Awards, but was not accepted as a nominee.

== Plot ==
We follow two generations in late 1960s Stockholm. On one hand, there are the teenagers Pär and Annika — how they meet by chance, seek a connection, and tentatively begin a romance. Their youthful happiness stands in contrast to the sense of aimlessness felt by the parental generation. Annika’s parents, in particular, are disappointed with how their lives turned out, despite their material prosperity. During a traditional Swedish crayfish party, alcohol loosens the adults' inhibitions, and the evening takes a turn none of them could have foreseen.

== Cast ==
- Ann-Sofie Kylin as Annika
- Rolf Sohlman as Pär
- Anita Lindblom as Eva
- Bertil Norström as John Hellberg
- Lennart Tellfelt as Lasse
- Margreth Weivers as Elsa
- Arne Andersson as Arne
- Maud Backéus as Gunhild
- Verner Edberg as Verner
- Elsie Holm as Guest at Crayfish Party
- Tommy Nilsson as Roger
- Gunnar Ossiander as Pär's Grandfather
- Gunvor Ternéus as Guest at Crayfish Party
- Lennart Tollén as Lennart
- Björn Andrésen as Pär's Buddy

== Production ==
Roy Andersson had just graduated from film school, having made two promising short films and a 48 minutes examination film, when he was given the opportunity to make A Swedish Love Story. The film was shot between 16 June and 26 August 1969.

== Reception ==
In his review for DVD Talk, Svet Atanasov wrote that is "one of the greatest films of its decade [1970s] (...) there isn't any of the rancid teenage kitsch contemporary filmmakers are fascinated with." The Time Out Film Guide 2009 says the film is "strangely touching and wonderfully strange."

Scenes from the film make up the video for the 2010 single "Round The Moon" by Summer Camp.

== Awards ==
It was entered into the 20th Berlin International Film Festival. The film was also selected as the Swedish entry for the Best Foreign Language Film at the 43rd Academy Awards, but was not accepted as a nominee. At the 7th Guldbagge Awards the film won the award for Best Film.

== See also ==
- List of submissions to the 43rd Academy Awards for Best Foreign Language Film
- List of Swedish submissions for the Academy Award for Best Foreign Language Film
