= Songs from the Second Floor =

2000 Swedish film by Roy Andersson

- Original Swedish poster
- Directed by: Roy Andersson
- Written by: Roy Andersson
- Produced by: Lisa Alwert; Roy Andersson; Philippe Bober; Sanne Glæsel; Johan Mardell
- Starring: Lars Nordh; Stefan Larsson; Bengt C.W. Carlsson; Torbjörn Fahlström; Sten Andersson
- Cinematography: István Borbás; Jesper Klevenas; Robert Komarek
- Edited by: Roy Andersson
- Music by: Benny Andersson
- Release dates: May 2000 (Cannes); October 6, 2000 (Sweden)
- Running time: 98 minutes
- Countries: Sweden; Norway; Denmark
- Language: Swedish
- Budget: $5.5 million

Songs from the Second Floor (Swedish: Sånger från andra våningen) is a 2000 Swedish comedy-drama film written and directed by Roy Andersson. It presents a series of disconnected vignettes that together interrogate aspects of modern life. It uses quotations from the work of Peruvian poet César Vallejo as a recurring motif. The film was selected as the Swedish entry for the Best Foreign Language Oscar at the 73rd Academy Awards, but it did not make the final shortlist.

It is the first film in a trilogy, followed by You, the Living (2007) and A Pigeon Sat on a Branch Reflecting on Existence (2014).

== Plot ==
The film is composed of various loosely connected vignettes. It follows numerous characters during a city-wide, unending traffic jam with no clear cause. Stock brokers whipping each-other are filling up the streets. A businessman is fired and pleads for his job. A man looking for someone's office is beaten on the street by passersby. A magician accidentally injures a volunteer with a saw. A furniture salesman burns down his business for insurance money, and one of his sons, a poet, has been institutionalized. Shortly after deciding to try selling crucifixes, the furniture salesman starts being followed by ghosts, including someone he borrowed money from and a boy killed during Nazi occupation of Russia. Meanwhile, a senile general is celebrated on his 100th birthday and makes a Nazi salute. An economist finds that they "can't afford to work" anymore. The economist, along with clergy, push a young girl off a cliff in front of a large crowd hoping it will fix their problems, but it does not seem to help. Dozens of businessmen push carts overburdened with luggage and golf clubs to the airport. Outside the city, the furniture salesman discards his unsold crucifixes. He's approached by a crowd of ghosts, including the sacrificed young girl, and he begs them to leave him be.

== Cast ==
- Lars Nordh as Kalle
- Stefan Larsson as Stefan
- Bengt C. W. Carlsson as Lennart
- Torbjörn Fahlström as Pelle Wigert
- Sten Andersson as Lasse
- Rolando Núñez as the foreigner
- Lucio Vucina as the magician
- Per Jörnelius as the sawed man
- Peter Roth as Tomas
- Klas-Gösta Olsson as the speechwriter
- Nils-Åke Eriksson as patient
- Hanna Eriksson as Mia
- Tommy Johansson as Uffe
- Jöran Mueller as the economist
- Sture Olsson as Sven
- Fredrik Sjögren as the Russian boy

== Release ==
The film was released to cinemas in Sweden on 6 October 2000.

== Reception ==
=== Critical response ===
Film critic J. Hoberman from The Village Voice concluded about the film: "Easier to respect than enthuse over, Andersson's rigorous personal vision is not only distanced but distancing." Roger Ebert of Chicago Sun-Times gave the film four stars out of four and wrote, "You may not enjoy it but you will not forget it." Anton Bitel, writing for Eye for Film, felt that "the heavy symbolism overwhelms the storytelling."

On review aggregator Rotten Tomatoes, the film received an 89% approval rating, based on 35 reviews, with an average rating of 7.5/10. On Metacritic, the film was given a score of 76 out of 100, based on 14 critics, indicating "generally favorable reviews".

The film is featured in "Ari's Adventures in Moviegoing", a collection of films on the Criterion Channel that were handpicked by Ari Aster, director of Midsommar (2019) and other horror films. Aster states that he saw this film in the theater with his mother at the age of 14, and states that the impact of this film on him was "seismic", citing the film as a major influence.

=== Awards and nominations ===
Wins

- Bodil Awards
  - Best Non-American Film (Bedste ikke amerikanske film) Roy Andersson (director)
- Cannes Film Festival
  - Jury Prize (Roy Andersson)
- Brothers Manaki International Film Festival
  - Audience Award István Borbás
- Norwegian International Film Festival
  - Norwegian Film Critics Award Roy Andersson
- Guldbagge Award
  - Best Film (Bästa film) Lisa Alwert
  - Best Direction (Bästa regi) Roy Andersson
  - Best Screenplay (Bästa manuskript) Roy Andersson
  - Best Cinematography (Bästa foto) István Borbás and Jesper Klevenas
  - Best Achievement (Bästa prestation) Jan Alvemark

Nominations

- Cannes Film Festival
  - Golden Palm
- British Independent Film Awards
  - Best Foreign Independent Film - Foreign Language

== See also ==
- César Vallejo
- List of films with longest production time
- List of submissions to the 73rd Academy Awards for Best Foreign Language Film
- List of Swedish submissions for the Academy Award for Best Foreign Language Film
