= Roy Andersson =

Swedish film director

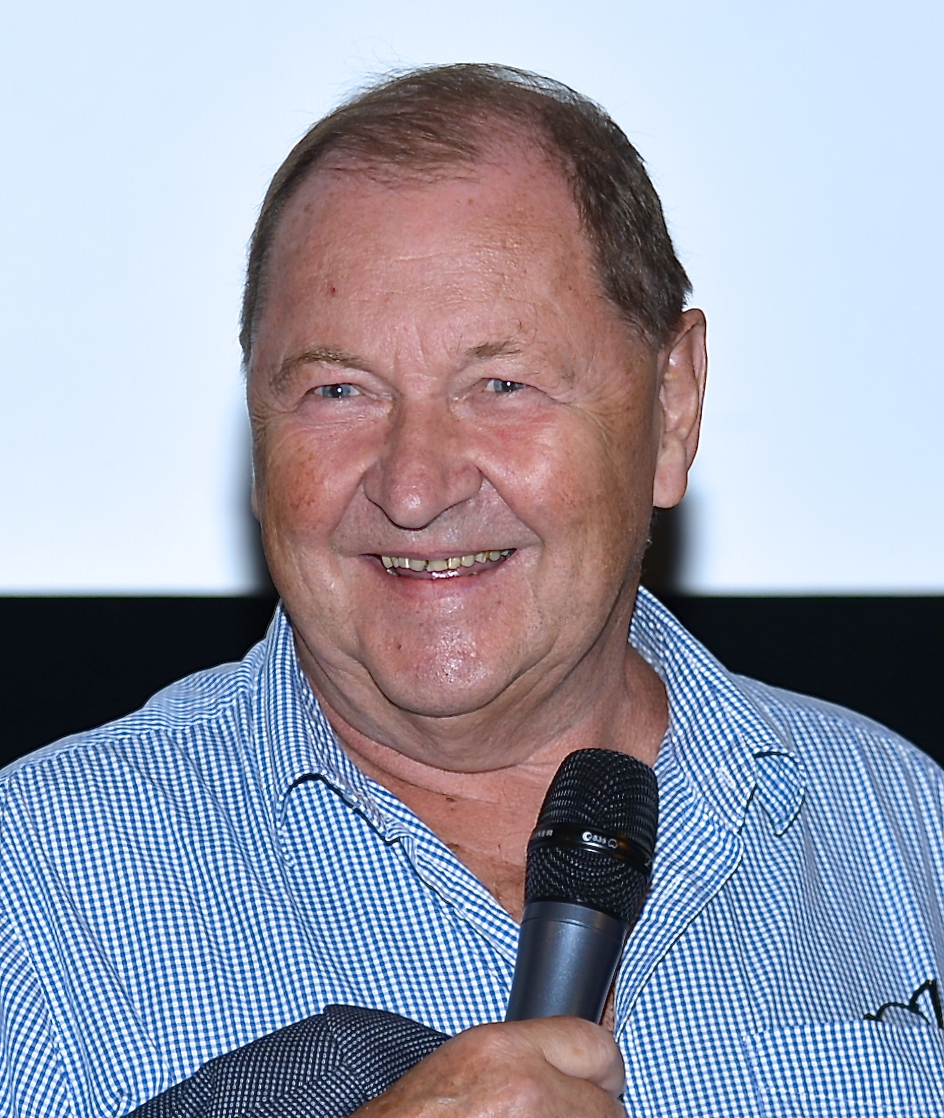
- Andersson in 2014
- Born: Roy Arne Lennart Andersson; 31 March 1943 (age 83); Uddevalla, Sweden
- Occupation: Film director
- Years active: 1967–present

Roy Arne Lennart Andersson (born 31 March 1943) is a Swedish film director. His early films are naturalistic, most notably his feature film debut A Swedish Love Story (1970), which was a success in Sweden. It was followed by Giliap (1975), a more stylized film whose commercial failure made Andersson unable to make another feature film for 25 years. Because of this, Andersson spent much of his professional life working on advertisement spots, directing over 400 commercials and two short films. During this period he changed style to one characterized by long takes, and stiff and grotesque caricatures.

Andersson returned to feature films with Songs from the Second Floor, for which he received the 2000 Cannes Film Festival's Jury Prize. His film A Pigeon Sat on a Branch Reflecting on Existence (2014) won the Venice International Film Festival's Golden Lion. His other feature films are You, the Living (2007) and About Endlessness (2019).

== Early life and education ==
Roy Arne Lennart Andersson was born on 31 March 1943 in Uddevalla, the eldest of four brothers. He was raised in Hisingen.

He studied literature and philosophy at university, then entered the Swedish Film Institute Film School in 1967.

== Career ==
=== 1969–1992: Early work ===
He directed his first feature-length film, A Swedish Love Story (1969). The film, awarded four prizes the same year at the 20th Berlin International Film Festival, looked at the nature and nuance of young love and turned out to be a major critical and popular success for Andersson. Following this success, Andersson fell into a depression. As he didn't want to get stuck with the same style and expectations he cancelled what was going to be his next project, with the script half-way finished, and skipped a couple of other ideas for plots he had previously planned to realize. Eventually he directed the film Giliap which was released in 1975. The film was a financial and critical disaster. After Giliap, Andersson took a 25-year break from film directing, focusing his efforts mainly on his commercial work.

In 1981 he established Studio 24, an independent film company and studio located in central Stockholm. Later, he directed a short-film commissioned by the Swedish National Board of Health and Welfare entitled Something Happened. Made in 1987, the short was meant to be played at schools all over Sweden as an educational film about AIDS, but was cancelled when it was three-quarters complete because of its overly dark nature and controversial use of sources. The official explanation was that it was "too dark in its message," and it wasn't officially shown until 1993. His next short film, 1991's World of Glory, developed this style even further and was a critical success, winning both the Canal Plus Award and the Press Prize at the 1992 Clermont-Ferrand Short Film Festival. The film is on a top ten list of all-time best short films, set by the Clermont-Ferrand festival.

=== 1996–present ===
In March 1996, Andersson began filming Songs from the Second Floor, a film that was completed four years later in May 2000. After its premiere at the 2000 Cannes Film Festival the film also became an international critical success. It won the Jury Prize in Cannes and five Guldbagge Awards in Sweden for best film, direction, cinematography, screenplay and sound. The film was made up of forty-six long tableaux shots, marrying tough, bleak social criticism with his characteristic absurdist dead-pan and surrealism.

Andersson continued his commercial work at Studio 24 and his next film You, the Living premiered at the 2007 Cannes Film Festival as part of the Un Certain Regard selection. The film won the Nordic Council Film Prize in 2008. The Museum of Modern Art in New York City presented a retrospective of Andersson's work in September 2009.

He expressed his desire to make a new film that could be considered the third part in a trilogy together with his two latest films, and publicly stated that he was planning "a third enormous, deep and fantastic, humorous and tragic, philosophical, Dostoyevsky film." In an interview with Ignatiy Vishnevetsky, Andersson revealed that he would be shooting his next film in high-definition video, possibly using the Red One camera, and that it would represent a departure in style from his previous two films. The film, titled A Pigeon Sat on a Branch Reflecting on Existence was released in 2014 and won the Golden Lion for Best Film in competition at the 71st Venice International Film Festival.

The Museum of Arts and Design in New York City presented a retrospective of Andersson's work entitled It's Hard to Be Human: The Cinema of Roy Andersson in 2015.

In 2019 he released his sixth film About Endlessness which won the Silver Lion at the Venice International Film Festival. Peter Bradshaw of The Guardian praised the film writing that it is "another of Andersson’s superb anthologies of the human condition: people with a zombie-white pallor enclosed in enigmatic tableaux, populating his utterly unique world of unreality and artificiality, scenes of tragicomedy inspired by Tati and Monty Python and created with masterly model work and green-screen effects in the studio. He shows moments of all too human weakness, weariness, gentleness, bewilderment, despair; there are nauseating visions of war crimes, returning us to the genocidal horror he showed in his 1991 short film World of Glory."

== Influences ==
Early in his career, Andersson was very influenced by naturalism and realism, holding the films of Italian neorealism—especially Vittorio De Sica—and the Czechoslovak New Wave as ideals. He then began to view more stylized expressions as richer and wiser, citing the making of a commercial in 1985 as a decisive moment. Two prominent influences became the German painters Otto Dix and George Grosz, and especially Dix, whom he holds as his favourite painter. He says their experience from World War I informed how they expressed desperation in ways that reveal a profound love of life and other people.

Andersson describes the novel Journey to the End of the Night by Louis-Ferdinand Céline as a major influence and his "absolute favourite" book, praising its combination of ruthlessness, empathy, drastic humour and fury. Andersson has said: "It is perhaps the blackest thing ever written. It is so incredibly open and unprejudiced. But also funny." He has long held a large-scale film adaptation of the novel as his dream project, and at times looked into the possibility of funding it. He said in 2015 that his age by then would make it difficult, but he would still be happy to make the film if there was a financial backer.

Other influences Andersson has mentioned include Francisco Goya, Pieter Bruegel, Luis Buñuel, Federico Fellini, Jacques Tati's Playtime, Henri Matisse, James Ensor, Albert Camus, Stig Dagerman, Hjalmar Söderberg, Honoré de Balzac and Fyodor Dostoevsky.

In 2012, Andersson participated in the Sight & Sound film polls of that year. Held every ten years to select the greatest films of all time, contemporary directors were asked to select ten films of their choice. Andersson stated: "All the ten films are excellent and fascinating artistic expressions about what I would call mankind’s both raw and delightful existence. These movies make us wiser." He added "My absolute favourite is Bicycle Thieves, the most humanistic and political film in history. Viridiana is the most intelligent and Hiroshima mon amour is the most poetic." His choices are listed below, in alphabetical order:

- Amarcord (Italy, 1972)
- Andrei Rublev (Russia, 1966)
- Ashes and Diamonds (Poland, 1958)
- Barry Lyndon (United States, 1975)
- The Battle of Algiers (Italy, 1968)
- Bicycle Thieves (Italy, 1948)
- Hiroshima Mon Amour (France, 1959)
- Intolerance (United States, 1916)
- Rashomon (Japan, 1950)
- Viridiana (Mexico, 1961)

== Awards and honors ==
Andersson has had four films officially submitted for the Academy Award for Best Foreign Language Film as Swedish entries.

His 2014 film A Pigeon Sat on a Branch Reflecting on Existence won the Golden Lion award at 71st Venice International Film Festival, making Andersson the only Swedish director and the second Nordic director to win the award in the history of the festival, after Danish Carl Theodor Dreyer won in 1955.

- 2000: "Stig Dagerman Prize"
- 2000: Jury Prize from Cannes Film Festival for Songs from the Second Floor
- 2010: Lenin Award
- 2014: "Golden Lion for Best Film" for A Pigeon Sat on a Branch Reflecting on Existence (71st Venice International Film Festival)
- 2020: Lifetime Achievement Award (Odesa International Film Festival)

== Filmography ==
=== Films ===
Year	English Title	Original	Ref.
1970	A Swedish Love Story	En kärlekshistoria	
1975	Giliap	–	
2000	Songs from the Second Floor	Sånger från andra våningen	
2007	You, the Living	Du levande	
2014	A Pigeon Sat on a Branch Reflecting on Existence	En duva satt på en gren och funderade på tillvaron	
2019	About Endlessness	Om det oändliga	–

=== Short films ===
Year	English Title	Original	Ref.
1967	Visiting One's Son	Besöka sin son	
1968	The White Game	Den vita sporten	
1968	–	Hämta en cykel	
1969	–	Lördagen den 5.10	
1987	Something Happened	Någonting har hänt	
1991	World of Glory	Härlig är jorden	

=== Commercials ===
Years	Title	Ref.
1967–1972	"List of commercials". Archived from the original on March 14, 2007.	
1973–1980	"List of commercials". Archived from the original on April 19, 2007.	
1981–1990	"List of commercials". Archived from the original on March 14, 2007.	
1991–	"List of commercials". Archived from the original on March 14, 2007.	
Source: royandersson.com
IMDb link

== Bibliography ==
- Lyckad nedfrysning av herr Moro (1992)
- Vår tids rädsla för allvar (1995)
- Fotografier 1960-2003 (2012)
