= You, the Living =

- Swedish cinema poster
- Directed by: Roy Andersson
- Written by: Roy Andersson
- Produced by: Pernilla Sandström
- Starring: Elisabet Helander; Björn Englund; Jessika Lundberg
- Cinematography: Gustav Danielsson
- Edited by: Anna Märta Waern
- Music by: Benny Andersson
- Production company: Studio 24
- Distributed by: SFI (Sweden); Artificial Eye (UK); Palisades Tartan (US)
- Release dates: May 24, 2007 (Cannes); September 21, 2007 (Sweden); March 28, 2008 (UK); July 29, 2009 (US)
- Running time: 95 minutes
- Countries: Sweden; France; Germany; Denmark; Norway
- Language: Swedish
- Budget: 44 million SEK

You, the Living (Swedish: Du levande) is a 2007 Swedish black comedy-drama film written and directed by Roy Andersson. The film is an exploration of the "grandeur of existence", centered on the lives of a group of individuals, such as an overweight woman, a disgruntled psychiatrist, a heartbroken groupie, a carpenter, a business consultant, and a school teacher with emotional problems and her rug-selling husband. The basis for the film is an Old Norse proverb, "Man is man's delight", taken from the Poetic Edda poem Hávamál. The title comes from a stanza in Goethe's Roman Elegies, which also appears as a title card in the beginning of the film: "Therefore rejoice, you, the living, in your lovely warm bed, until Lethe's cold wave wets your fleeing foot."

The film consists of a fluent succession of fifty short sketches, most with a tragicomic undertone. The cast is mostly non-professional, and alienating techniques are employed such as presenting the characters in grim make-up and having them talk directly to camera. The financing was difficult and the shooting took three years to complete. The film won the Silver Hugo Award for Best Direction at the 2007 Chicago International Film Festival and has received critical acclaim. The film also received the Georges Delerue Award for Best Soundtrack/Sound Design at Film Fest Gent in 2007. You, the Living was also Sweden's submission for the Academy Award for Best Foreign Language Film at the 80th Academy Awards, but it was not selected as a nominee.

It is the second film in a trilogy, preceded by Songs from the Second Floor (2000) and followed by A Pigeon Sat on a Branch Reflecting on Existence (2014).

== Plot summary ==
There is no plot, but some of the vignettes connect loosely. All the stories show the essential humanity of the characters and address themes of life, existence and happiness.

The film makes repeated use of distinctive cinematic techniques. One of these is dreams and how they reflect the fears and desires of the characters. Another is the use of music, in conjunction with dialogues and editing, both as background music and as performed on camera. The film starts with a monologue which ends up being sung to Dixieland jazz music being played by lone musicians, each in a different room in a different part of the city.

Stories in the film include:

- A middle-aged woman (Elisabeth Helander) laments her misfortunes while being completely self-absorbed. Her boyfriend (Jugge Nohall) tries to comfort her and invites her to dinner. The woman later rejects an admirer in a trenchcoat (Jan Wikbladh) who tries to give her a bouquet of flowers.
- A carpenter (Leif Larsson) has a dream in which he is condemned and executed for breaking a 200-year-old china set while trying to perform the tablecloth trick.
- A pickpocket (Waldemar Nowak) steals the wallet of a high roller (Gunnar Ivarsson) at an expensive restaurant before he has paid the bill.
- A psychiatrist (Håkan Angser) has lost faith in people's ability to be happy because of their selfishness, and now only prescribes pills.
- A business consultant (Olle Olson) gets his hair butchered by an angry barber (Kemal Sener) before attending a meeting where the CEO (Bengt C. W. Carlsson) dies of a stroke.
- A sousaphone player (Björn Englund) earns money by playing in funerals, including that of the CEO.
- A girl (Jessika Lundberg) finds her musical idol Micke Larsson (Eric Bäckman) in a tavern. He invites her and her friend for a drink, but ditches her by giving her the wrong directions to his band rehearsal. A while later at the tavern, she tells the people at the bar of the dream she had about him. In the dream, they have just married, and their apartment building travels on a railway into a station where people cheer for the happy couple.
- A husband and wife (Pär Fredriksson and Jessica Nilsson) have a fight and they both dwell on it, causing them to get into trouble at work.

The film ends with a montage of characters who stop in the middle of everyday chores to look up into the sky. Dixieland music is once again played as the camera is put on the wing of an airplane. A large formation of B-52 bombers appears in front of the camera as they fly menacingly in over a large city. This bookends with the opening scene where a man wakes up and tells the audience that he had a nightmare about bombers coming.

== Production ==
From very early on there was trouble with the financing. Andersson had to make regular visits to a pawn shop and several times the team paused production to make commercials, using the proceeds for the film. After being refused funding from the Swedish Film Institute, Roy Andersson accused the consultant of nepotism after he instead gave the money to a film directed by his father-in-law. That film eventually ended up receiving poor reviews. Eventually, with eighteen organizations from six different countries involved in financing the production, the total budget amounted to slightly over five million euros.

For the casting, Andersson or an assistant approached people on the street and asked them to participate. Amateurs were preferred to professionals because of the greater selection and the problem of asking renowned actors to take small parts. The exception was Bengt C.W. Carlsson, a professional actor, in the role of the CEO. Actors from Andersson's previous feature films and commercials were also reused.

Crew posing on the large city model used in the film's final shot.

The film was shot in Roy Andersson's own studio in Östermalm, Stockholm. The filming of the scenes took three years to finish. "It is not the shooting itself that takes time, but the work on creating the environments. We built almost all the sets in the studio, even those that took place outdoors. Most of the time we started from Roy's sketches," said Johan Carlsson, production manager. There is one single scene that wasn't shot in studio, featuring a bus shelter in heavy rain. It had to be shot outdoors because of the huge amount of running water. Nothing in the film was made with computer-generated imagery. The city seen from above in the final shot was a large model built solely for that scene.

The colour scape was designed to have a minimum of contrast, which the director believed would create more intensity. Lighting was arranged to leave no shadows: "I want light where people can't hide in – light without mercy." Andersson is famous for his many takes of each scene, although this time he claimed it went smoother than usual: "max. 40–50 takes and sometimes under ten!"

== Soundtrack ==
For the musical score, Roy Andersson originally approached former ABBA member Benny Andersson, who composed the theme for the director's previous film, Songs from the Second Floor. Benny Andersson was however occupied with the Mamma Mia! film adaption, and declined. Some of Benny Andersson's music from Songs from the Second Floor was rearranged and used. Much of the music is played as march music and traditional jazz. "I have played this type of music myself and thought it was about time it got featured in a film. Moreover, I am fascinated by the unsuspecting music that existed in the 1930s when Nazism emerged," Andersson explained in an interview.

A melody featured on several occasions is "En liten vit kanin", in English "A Little White Rabbit", a song that was recorded by Edvard Persson in the 1930s and became very popular in Sweden. Another song used is the religious "Jag har hört om en stad ovan molnen", literally "I Have Heard of a City above the Clouds", originally based on a Russian folk melody and often played at funerals in Sweden. This song was originally planned to be used during the ending sequence, but eventually Andersson decided to use a more energizing jazz tune instead: "I want the audience to leave the theater with a little more lust for opposition." Other songs include the German university song "O alte Burschenherrlichkeit" with Swedish lyrics by August Lindh, and the original song "Motorcykel", performed by Stockholm Classic Jazz Band and with lyrics by Roy Andersson.

== Release ==
You, the Living premiered at the 2007 Cannes Film Festival, as part of the Un Certain Regard selection. It subsequently played at several other film festivals, including Toronto International Film Festival on 7 September 2007 and Chicago International Film Festival on 8 October 2007, where Roy Andersson was awarded the Silver Hugo for Direction "for his extraordinary, quirky vision and humor."

On 21 September 2007, the film was released in Sweden. It was sold to fifty countries, including the United Kingdom where it was released on 28 March 2008. On 29 July 2009 it premiered in the United States, limited to Film Forum in New York City.

== Reception ==
=== Critical response ===
The film was well received by Swedish critics, with an aggregate rating of 4.1 out of 5 based on 22 reviews at Kritiker.se, which made it by far the highest rated Swedish film of 2007. Carl-Johan Malmberg at Svenska Dagbladet called Andersson "the black diamond of comedy in Swedish film life." Further, he compared the casting to Vittorio De Sica's 1948 film Bicycle Thieves, and the usage of the cast to "a fastidious Samuel Beckett".

The international response was also positive. The film holds a 98% approval rating on Rotten Tomatoes, based on 43 reviews, with an average rating of 7.7/10. The site's critical consensus reads: "Composed of humorous sketches of human behavior, Roy Andersson's You, the Living is an eccentric but highly entertaining and unforgettable work." On Metacritic the film has a score of 81 out of 100, based on 14 reviews, indicating "universal acclaim".

Peter Bradshaw at The Guardian gave it 4 out of 5 and called it "the work of a real original – I might almost say a genius. He is radically different from anyone else, with a technical, compositional rigour that puts other movie-makers and visual artists to shame. And he really is funny." In an early Cannes review for Variety, Justin Chang was mainly positive although he still found that "a certain repetitiveness does eventually seep into the structure, and one could complain that the individual scenes don't ultimately build to anything (or that the arrangement of scenes is fairly arbitrary)."

Mexican director Alejandro González Iñárritu listed the film in his top ten favorites for the 2022 Sight and Sound poll.

=== Accolades ===
In addition to the awards and nominations, You, the Living was also Sweden's submission for the Academy Award for Best Foreign Language Film at the 80th Academy Awards, but it was not selected as a nominee.

Award	Category	Name	Result
Chicago International Film Festival	Best Director	Roy Andersson	Won
European Film Awards	Best Director	Roy Andersson	Nominated
Fantasporto	Directors' Week Award – Best Director	Roy Andersson	Won
Film Fest Gent	Georges Delerue Prize	Benny Andersson	Won
Film Fest Gent	Grand Prix		Nominated
Gothenburg Film Festival	Audience Award	Roy Andersson	Won
43rd Guldbagge Awards	Best Film	Pernilla Sandström	Won
43rd Guldbagge Awards	Best Director	Roy Andersson	Won
43rd Guldbagge Awards	Best Screenplay	Roy Andersson	Won
43rd Guldbagge Awards	Best Cinematography	Gustav Danielsson	Nominated
Nordic Council	The Nordic Council Film Prize	Roy Andersson, Pernilla Sandström	Won

== See also ==
- List of submissions to the 80th Academy Awards for Best Foreign Language Film
- List of Swedish submissions for the Academy Award for Best Foreign Language Film
