= Guldbagge Award for Best Documentary Feature =

Swedish film award

- Country: Sweden
- Presented by: Swedish Film Institute
- First award: 2000 (for documentary films released during the 2000 film season)
- Currently held by: Mika Gustafson, Olivia Kastebring and Christina Tsiobanelis, Silvana (2017)
- Website: guldbaggen.se

The Guldbagge for Best Documentary Feature is a Swedish film award presented annually by the Swedish Film Institute (SFI) as part of the Guldbagge Awards (Swedish: "Guldbaggen") to award documentary films in the Swedish motion picture industry.

== Winners and nominees ==
Each Guldbagge Awards ceremony is listed chronologically below, along with the winner of the Guldbagge Award for Best Documentary Feature and the director associated with the award. In the columns under the winner of each award are the other nominees for best documentary feature.

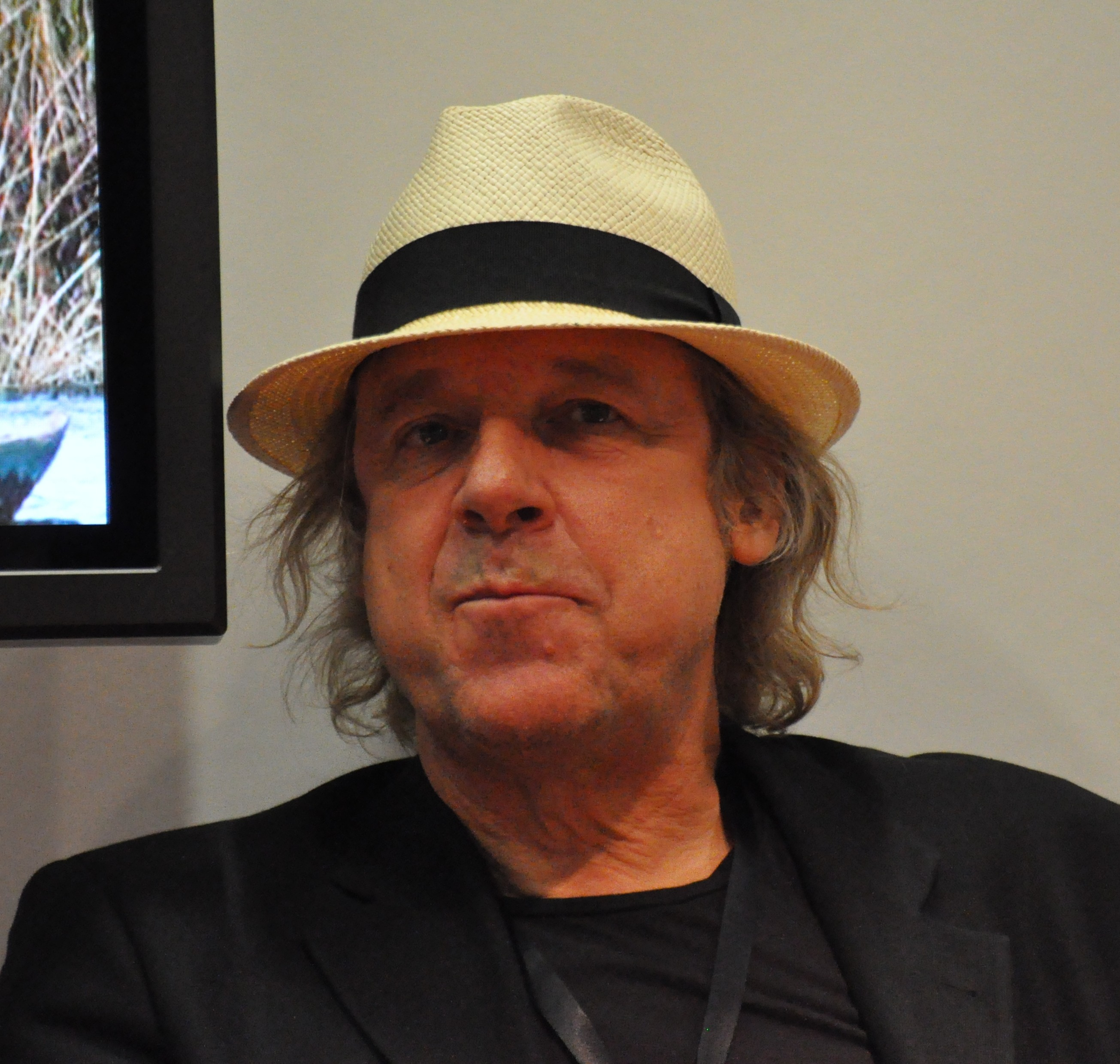
Gunnar Bergdahl won the award in 2001 for Ljudmilas röst.

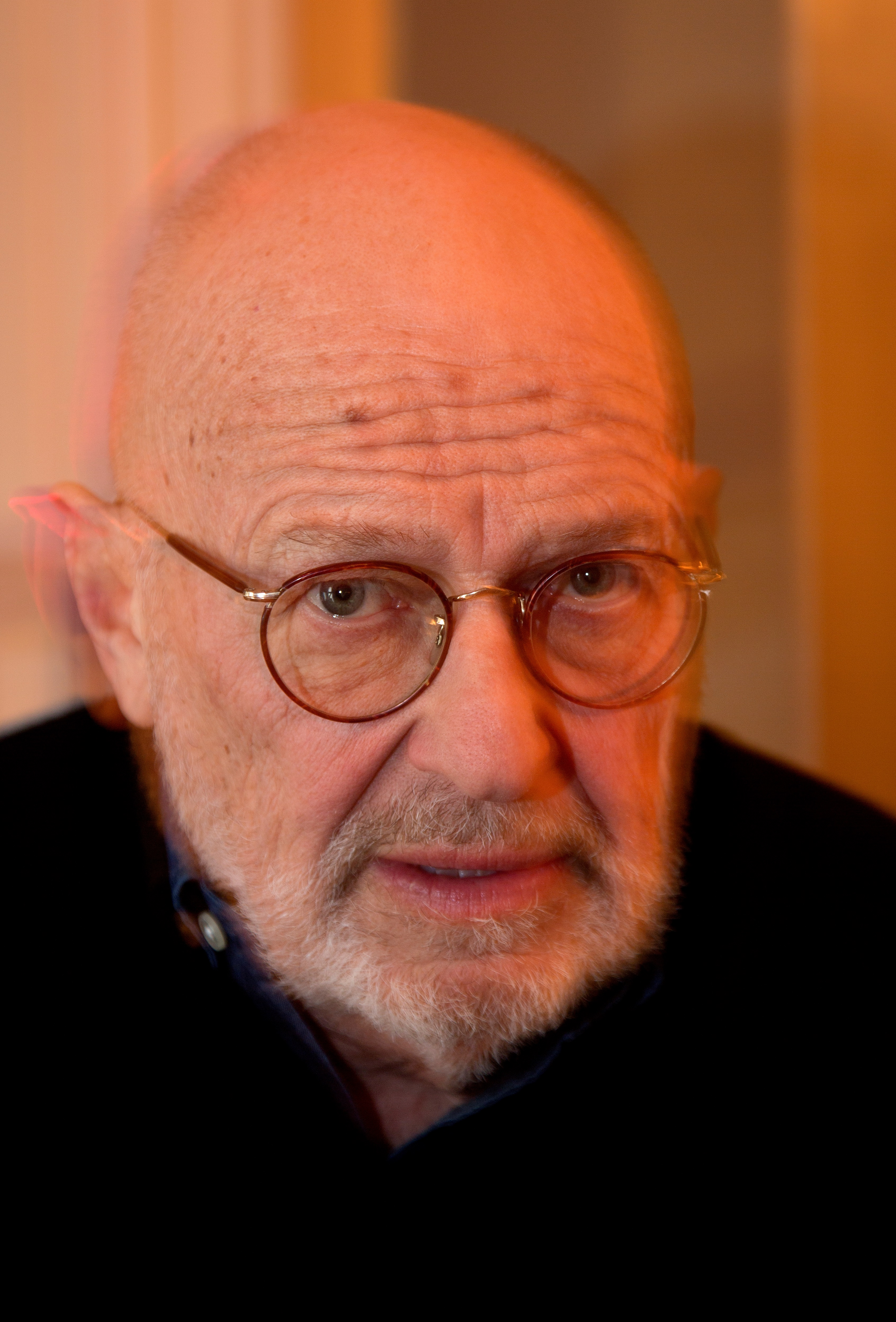
Stefan Jarl won the award in 2002 for The Bricklayer.

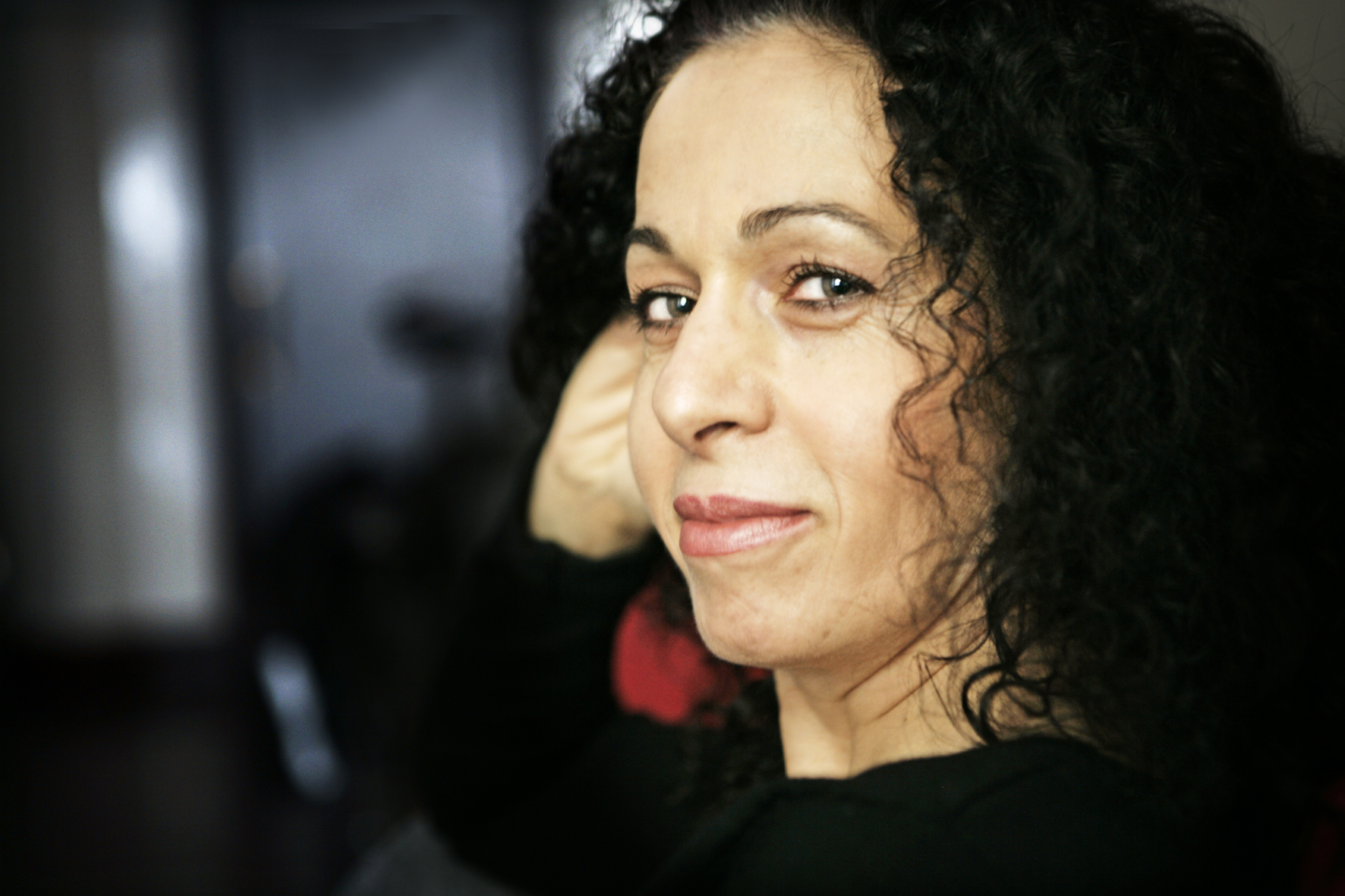
Nahid Persson Sarvestani won the award in 2005 for Prostitution Behind the Veil.

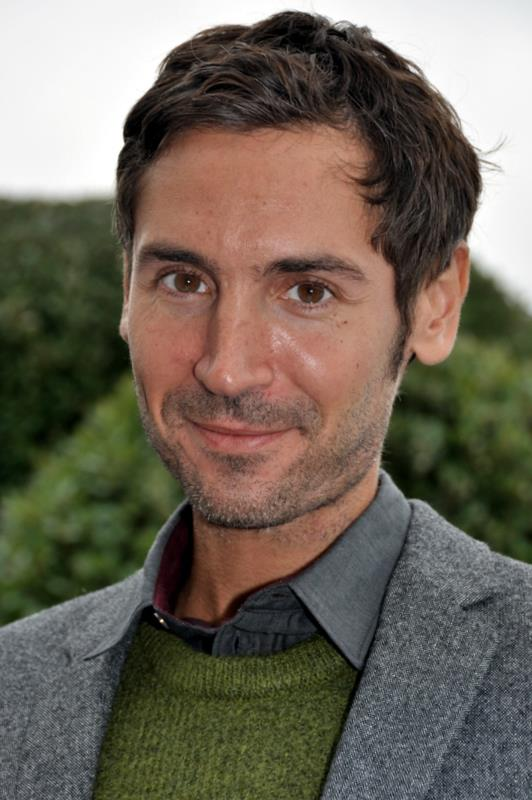
Malik Bendjelloul won the award in 2012 for Searching for Sugar Man.

Year	Film	Director(s)	Ref.
2000 (36th)	Min mamma hade fjorton barn‡	Lars Lennart Forsberg	
2000 (36th)	Fyren	Kristian Petri, Jan Röed and Magnus Enquist	
2000 (36th)	Respect!	Susanna Edwards	
2001 (37th)	Ljudmilas röst‡	Gunnar Bergdahl	
2001 (37th)	Låt dom andra sköta kärleken	Ruben Östlund	
2001 (37th)	Mormor, Hitler och jag	Carl Johan De Geer	
2002 (38th)	The Bricklayer‡	Stefan Jarl	
2002 (38th)	Boogie Woogie Pappa	Erik Bäfving	
2002 (38th)	Gömd	David Aronowitsch, Hanna Heilborn and Mats Johansson	
2003 (39th)	Du ska nog se att det går över‡	Cecilia Neant-Falk	
2003 (39th)	Surplus: Terrorized Into Being Consumers	Erik Gandini	
2003 (39th)	Zonen	Esaias Baitel	
2004 (40th)	Armwrestler from Solitude‡	Lisa Munthe and Helen Ahlsson	
2004 (40th)	The Baker	Kristina Meiton	
2004 (40th)	Gå loss	Magnus Gertten and Erik Bäfving	
2005 (41st)	Prostitution Behind the Veil‡	Nahid Persson Sarvestani	
2005 (41st)	The Well	Kristian Petri	
2005 (41st)	The Kinch	Måns Månsson	
2006 (42nd)	The Substitute‡	Åsa Blanck and Johan Palmgren	
2006 (42nd)	Alice and Me	Rebecka Rasmusson	
2006 (42nd)	I Remember Håkan Alexandersson	Carl Johan De Geer	
2007 (43rd)	The Nun‡	Maud Nycander	
2007 (43rd)	Aching Heart	Oscar Hedin	
2007 (43rd)	Paradise	Jerzy Sladkowski	
2008 (44th)	Maggie in Wonderland‡	Mark Hammarberg, Ester Martin Bergsmark and Beatrice Andersson	
2008 (44th)	Mr. Governor	Måns Månsson	
2008 (44th)	An Extraordinary Study in Human Degradation	Patrik Eriksson	
2009 (45th)	Ebbe - The Movie‡	Karin af Klintberg and Jane Magnusson	
2009 (45th)	The Queen and I	Nahid Persson Sarvestani	
2009 (45th)	Videocracy	Erik Gandini	
2010 (46th)	Regretters‡	Marcus Lindeen	
2010 (46th)	Kiss Bill	Emelie Wallgren and Ina Holmqvist	
2010 (46th)	Familia	Mikael Wiström and Alberto Herskovits	
2011 (47th)	At Night I Fly‡	Michel Wenzer	
2011 (47th)	Stora scenen	Tova Mozard	
2011 (47th)	The Black Power Mixtape 1967–1975	Göran Olsson	
2012 (48th)	Searching for Sugar Man‡	Malik Bendjelloul	
2012 (48th)	Palme	Maud Nycander and Kristina Lindström	
2012 (48th)	Pojktanten	Ester Martin Bergsmark	
2013 (49th)	Belleville Baby‡	Mia Engberg	
2013 (49th)	Forest of the Dancing Spirits	Linda Västrik	
2013 (49th)	No Burqas Behind Bars	Nima Sarvestani	
2014 (50th)	Concerning Violence‡	Göran Olsson	
2014 (50th)	Apt. + Car + All I Have and Own	Clara Bodén	
2014 (50th)	Ute på landet	Anders Jedenfors	
2015 (51st)	Detained‡	Anna Persson and Shaon Chakraborty	
2015 (51st)	Every Face Has a Name	Magnus Gertten	
2015 (51st)	Ingrid Bergman: In Her Own Words	Stig Björkman	
2016 (52nd)	Martha & Niki‡	Tora Mkandawire Mårtens	
2016 (52nd)	Don Juan	Jerzy Sladkowski	
2016 (52nd)	MonaLisa Story	Jessica Nettelbladt	
2017 (53rd)	Silvana‡	Mika Gustafson, Olivia Kastebring and Christina Tsiobanelis	
2017 (53rd)	Letters to a Serial Killer	Manal Masri	
2017 (53rd)	The Celestial Darkroom	Nils Petter Löfstedt	
2018 (54th)	Reconstructing Utøya‡	Carl Javér	
2018 (54th)	The Raft	Marcus Lindeen	
2018 (54th)	The Deminer	Hogir Hirori	
2019 (55th)	Transnistra‡	Anna Eborn	
2019 (55th)	Fraemling	Mikel Cee Karlsson	
2019 (55th)	Josefin & Florin	Ellen Fiske and Joanna Karlberg	
2020 (56th)	Greta‡	Nathan Grossman	
2020 (56th)	Idomeni	David Aronowitsch	
2020 (56th)	Scheme Birds	Ellen Fiske and Ellinor Hallin	
2021 (57th)	Sabaya‡	Hogir Hirori	
2021 (57th)	Children of the Enemy	Gorki Glaser-Müller	
2021 (57th)	Lena	Isabel Andersson	
2021 (57th)	The Most Beautiful Boy in the World	Kristina Lindström and Kristian Petri	

== Documentary films in other categories ==
Before the introduction of the award at the 36th Guldbagge Awards, documentaries were qualified for the categories of Best Film, and Best Shortfilm. The following films won the categories they were nominated in.

=== Best Film ===
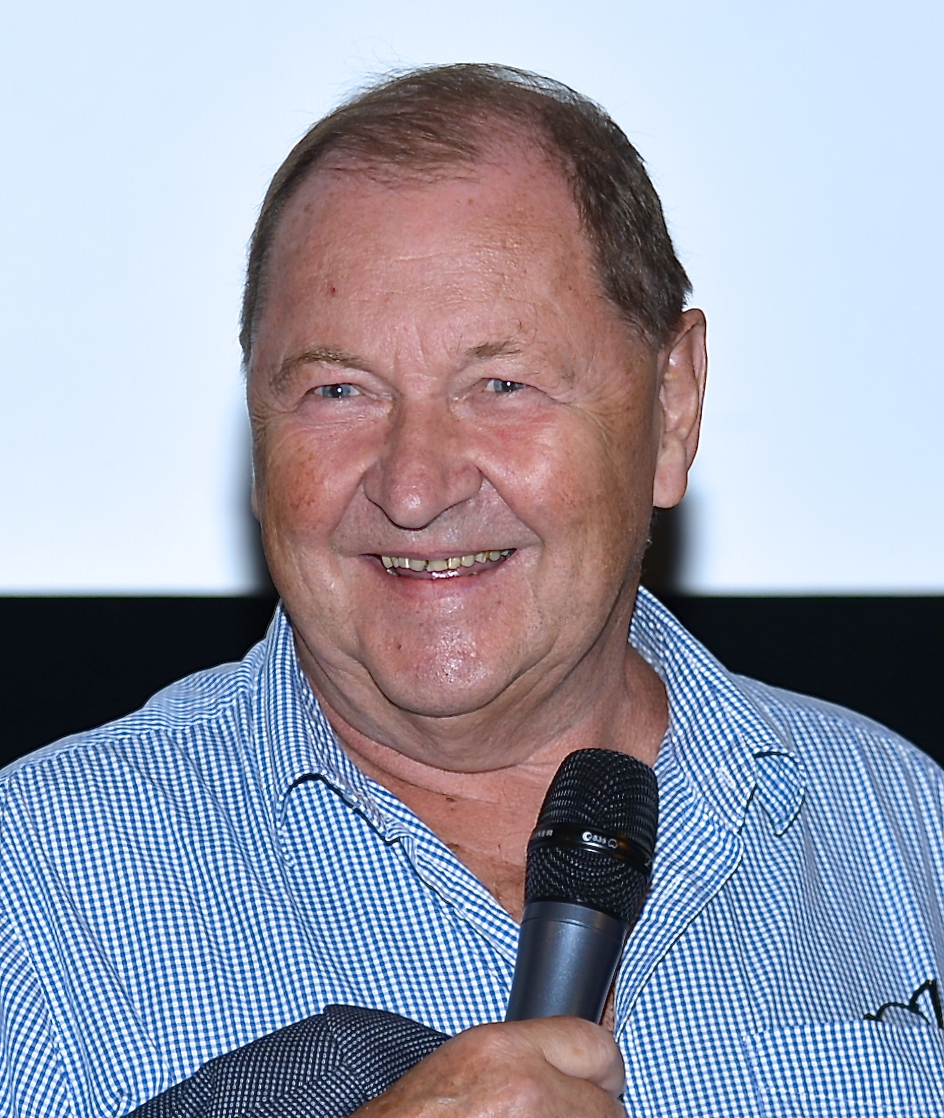
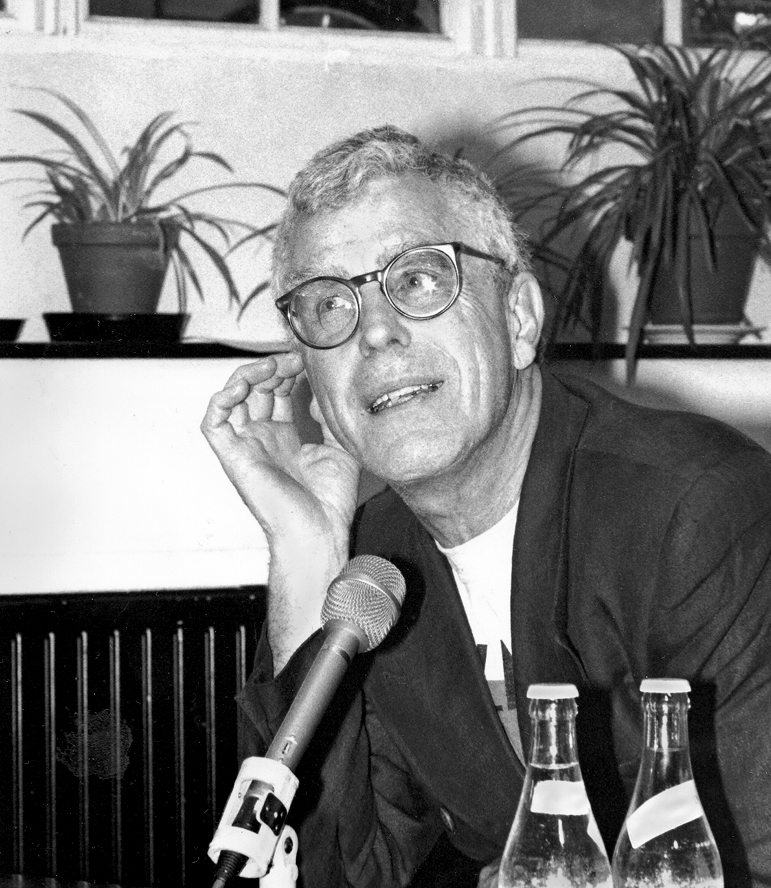
Roy Andersson (top), Bo Widerberg (bottom) co-won the award in 1968/69 for The White Game.

Year	Film	Director(s)	Ref.
1968/69 (6th)	The White Game‡	Grupp 13 (Note: Grupp 13 is a film collective consisting of Roy Andersson, Kalle Boman, Lena Ewert, Sven Fahlén, Staffan Hedqvist, Axel Rudorf-Lohmann, Lennart Malmer, Björn Öberg, Jörgen Persson, Ingela Romare, Inge Roos, Rudi Spee and Bo Widerberg.)	
1978/79 (15th)	A Respectable Life‡	Stefan Jarl	
1984 (20th)	Beyond Sorrow, Beyond Pain‡	Agneta Elers-Jarleman	
1988 (24th)	Back to Ararat‡	Jim Downing, Göran Gunér, Per-Åke Holmquist and Suzanne Khardalian	
1994 (30th)	A Pizza in Jordbro‡	Rainer Hartleb	

=== Best Shortfilm ===
Year	Film	Director(s)	Ref.
1996 (32nd)	I skuggan av solen‡	Susanna Edwards	
1998 (34th)	Aligermaas eventyr‡	Andra Lasmanis	
2000 (36th)	Del av den värld som är din‡	Karin Wegsjö	

== See also ==
- BAFTA Award for Best Documentary
- Academy Award for Best Documentary Feature
- Academy Award for Best Documentary (Short Subject)
- Independent Spirit Award for Best Documentary Feature
- Critics' Choice Movie Award for Best Documentary Feature
