= 25th Golden Globe Awards =

Film award ceremony in 1968

- Date: February 12, 1968

The 25th Golden Globe Awards, honoring the best in film and television for 1967, were held on February 12, 1968.

== Scandal resulting in FCC ban ==
The FCC imposed a ban on NBC's broadcast of the Golden Globes after the February 1968 ceremony. Movie critic Rex Reed, in a contemporary article about the broadcast, wrote:

NBC's telcast of the Foreign Press Association's 25th annual Golden Globe Awards had to be seen to be disbelieved. The Federal Communications Commission have sent lawyers to have it investigated. But award-giving, pointless as it is, is still big business, and it also gives viewers a chance to see their favorite stars make fools of themselves in public, so the Golden Globes were back, minus some of their sponsors, who backed out at the last minute....

Just last week Newsweek reported denials from the Foreign Press Association that its members give awards to the stars who throw the biggest feeds. "We are not influenced by a glass of champagne," snapped [HFPA President Howard] Luft, "Kirk Douglas threw a party last year, and what did he win? Nothing."

This year there was even a special category called the Cecil B. DeMille Humanitarian Award. Who won? You guessed it. Kirk Douglas.

The FCC was spurred to action because the public had been misled as to how the awards were actually made. Golden Globe broadcast advertisers determined Golden Globe winners and the HFPA pressured nominees to attend the award ceremony by threatening to award the Golden Globe won by a non-attendee to a losing nominee who was at the ceremony. The ban lasted until 1974.

After the ban, NBC once again broadcast the awards ceremony, but it terminated its contract with the HFPA after the Pia Zadora scandal of 1982.

== Winners and nominees ==
=== Film ===
Best Motion Picture
Drama	Comedy or Musical
In the Heat of the Night; Bonnie and Clyde; Far from the Madding Crowd; Guess Who's Coming to Dinner; In Cold Blood	The Graduate; Camelot; Doctor Dolittle; The Taming of the Shrew; Thoroughly Modern Millie
Best Performance in a Motion Picture – Drama
Actor	Actress
Rod Steiger - In the Heat of the Night as Police Chief Bill Gillespie; Alan Bates - Far from the Madding Crowd as Gabriel Oak; Warren Beatty - Bonnie and Clyde as Clyde Barrow; Paul Newman - Cool Hand Luke as Lucas "Luke" Jackson; Sidney Poitier - In the Heat of the Night as Detective Virgil Tibbs; Spencer Tracy - Guess Who's Coming to Dinner as Matt Drayton (posthumous)	Edith Evans - The Whisperers as Maggie Ross; Faye Dunaway - Bonnie and Clyde as Bonnie Parker; Audrey Hepburn - Wait Until Dark as Susy Hendrix; Katharine Hepburn - Guess Who's Coming to Dinner as Christina Drayton; Anne Heywood - The Fox as Ellen March
Best Performance in a Motion Picture – Comedy or Musical
Actor	Actress
Richard Harris - Camelot as King Arthur; Richard Burton - The Taming of the Shrew as Petruchio; Rex Harrison - Doctor Dolittle as Doctor John Dolittle; Dustin Hoffman - The Graduate as Benjamin Braddock; Ugo Tognazzi - The Climax as Sergio Masini	Anne Bancroft - The Graduate as Mrs. Robinson; Julie Andrews - Thoroughly Modern Millie as Millie Dillmount; Audrey Hepburn - Two for the Road as Joanna "Jo" Wallace; Shirley MacLaine - Woman Times Seven as Paulette / Maria Teresa / Linda / Edith / Eve Minou / Marie / Jeanne; Vanessa Redgrave - Camelot as Guenevere
Best Supporting Performance in a Motion Picture – Drama, Comedy or Musical
Supporting Actor	Supporting Actress
Richard Attenborough - Doctor Dolittle as Albert Blossom; John Cassavetes - The Dirty Dozen as Victor R. Franko; George Kennedy - Cool Hand Luke as Clarence "Dragline" Slidell; Michael J. Pollard - Bonnie and Clyde as C.W. Moss; Efrem Zimbalist Jr. - Wait Until Dark as Sam Hendrix	Carol Channing - Thoroughly Modern Millie as Muzzy Van Hossmere; Quentin Dean - In the Heat of the Night as Delores Purdy; Lillian Gish - The Comedians as Mrs. Smith; Lee Grant - In the Heat of the Night as Leslie Colbert; Prunella Ransome - Far from the Madding Crowd as Fanny Robin; Beah Richards - Guess Who's Coming to Dinner as Mrs. Prentice
Other
Best Director	Best Screenplay
Mike Nichols - The Graduate; Norman Jewison - In the Heat of the Night; Stanley Kramer - Guess Who's Coming to Dinner; Arthur Penn - Bonnie and Clyde; Mark Rydell - The Fox	In the Heat of the Night - Stirling Silliphant; Bonnie and Clyde - Robert Benton and David Newman; The Fox - Lewis John Carlino and Howard Koch; The Graduate - Buck Henry and Calder Willingham; Guess Who's Coming to Dinner - William Rose
Best Original Score	Best Original Song
Camelot - Frederick Loewe; Doctor Dolittle - Leslie Bricusse; Live for Life (Vivre pour vivre) - Francis Lai; Thoroughly Modern Millie - Elmer Bernstein; Two for the Road - Henry Mancini	"If Ever I Would Leave You" (Frederick Loewe, Alan Jay Lerner) - Camelot; "Talk to the Animals" (Leslie Bricusse) - Doctor Dolittle; "Circles in the Water (Des ronds dans l'eau)" (Francis Lai, Norman Gimbel) - Live for Life (Vivre pour vivre); "Please Don't Gamble with Love" (Guy Hemric, Jerry Styner) - Ski Fever; "Thoroughly Modern Millie" (Jimmy Van Heusen, Sammy Cahn) - Thoroughly Modern Millie
Best Foreign Film (English Language)	Best Foreign Film (Foreign Language)
The Fox (Canada); Accident (United Kingdom); The Jokers (United Kingdom); Smashing Time (United Kingdom); Ulysses (United Kingdom); The Whisperers (United Kingdom)	Live for Life (Vivre pour vivre) (France); Elvira Madigan (Sweden); The Climax (France/Italy); Closely Observed Trains (Ostre sledované vlaky) (Czechoslovakia); The Stranger (Lo straniero) (France)
New Star of the Year – Actor	New Star of the Year – Actress
Dustin Hoffman - The Graduate as Benjamin Braddock; Oded Kotler - Three Days and a Child as Eli; Franco Nero - Camelot as Lancelot du Lac; Michael J. Pollard - Bonnie and Clyde as C.W. Moss; Tommy Steele - The Happiest Millionaire as John Lawless	Katharine Ross - The Graduate as Elaine Robinson; Greta Baldwin - Rogue's Gallery as Valerie York; Pia Degermark - Elvira Madigan as Hedvig Jensen, "Elvira Madigan"; Faye Dunaway - Hurry Sundown as Lou McDowell; Katharine Houghton - Guess Who's Coming to Dinner as Joanna "Joey" Drayton; Sharon Tate - Valley of the Dolls as Jennifer North

The following films received multiple nominations:

Nominations	Title
7	Bonnie and Clyde
7	The Graduate
7	Guess Who's Coming to Dinner
7	In the Heat of the Night
6	Camelot
5	Doctor Dolittle
5	Thoroughly Modern Millie
4	The Fox
3	Far from the Madding Crowd
3	Live for Life (Vivre pour vivre)
2	Cool Hand Luke
2	Elvira Madigan
2	The Climax
2	The Taming of the Shrew
2	Two for the Road
2	Wait Until Dark
2	The Whisperers

The following films received multiple wins:

Wins	Title
5	The Graduate
3	Camelot
3	In the Heat of the Night

=== Television ===
Best Television Series
Mission: Impossible: The Carol Burnett Show; The Dean Martin Show; Garrison's Gorillas; Rowan & Martin's Laugh-In
Best Performance in a Television Series
Actor	Actress
Martin Landau - Mission: Impossible as Rollin Hand: Brendon Boone - Garrison's Gorillas as Chief; Ben Gazzara - Run for Your Life as Paul Bryan; Dean Martin - The Dean Martin Show as Himself; Andy Williams - The Andy Williams Show as Himself	Carol Burnett - The Carol Burnett Show as Various Characters: Barbara Bain - Mission: Impossible as Cinnamon Carter; Lucille Ball - The Lucy Show as Lucy Carmichael; Nancy Sinatra - Movin' with Nancy as Various Characters; Barbara Stanwyck - The Big Valley as Victoria Barkley

The following programs received multiple nominations:

Nominations	Title
3	Mission: Impossible
2	The Carol Burnett Show
2	The Dean Martin Show
2	Garrison's Gorillas

The following programs received multiple wins:

Wins	Title
2	Mission: Impossible

=== Cecil B. DeMille Award ===
Kirk Douglas

World Film Favorite (Male) Paul Newman

World Film Favorite (Female) Julie Andrews
