= Ådalen 31 =

1969 Swedish drama film

- Theatrical release poster
- Directed by: Bo Widerberg
- Written by: Bo Widerberg
- Starring: Peter Schildt; Kerstin Tidelius; Roland Hedlund
- Cinematography: Jörgen Persson
- Edited by: Bo Widerberg
- Distributed by: AB Svensk Filmindustri
- Release date: 1 May 1969 (Sweden)
- Running time: 114 minutes
- Country: Sweden
- Language: Swedish

Ådalen 31 (Swedish pronunciation: [ˈǒːdɑːlɛn]; released in the United States as Adalen Riots) is a 1969 Swedish drama film directed by Bo Widerberg. It depicts the 1931 Ådalen shootings, in which Swedish military forces opened fire against labour demonstrators in the Swedish sawmill district of Ådalen killing five people, including a young girl.

The film was X-rated in the United States. It won the Grand Prize of the Jury at the Cannes Film Festival and was nominated for the Academy Award for Best Foreign Language Film.

== Plot ==
In 1931, the working-class family Andersson of Ådalen are taking part in a massive sympathy strike for workers in the town Marmaverken. Harald, the father of the family, catches fish and manages to support his family while maintaining a good mood. Kjell, the oldest son, works at the office of the local sawmill manager, and is taught about classical music, impressionism and French pronunciation by the manager's wife. He plays in a jazz band with his friend Nisse with whom he also discusses things like girls, erogenous zones and hypnosis. As spring commences, the manager's daughter Anna comes home for school holiday. She and Kjell fall in love, and she becomes pregnant with his child.

When the sawmill is to deliver a big order to America, strikebreakers are called in from other towns. The local strikers become furious and police has to be called in to protect the strikebreakers. Still they are attacked by an angry crowd while working at the Sandviken wharf outside Kramfors. Some are thrown into the water, while others are beaten bloody. Harald takes care of an injured strikebreaker, but is confronted by a group of angry workers. He tries to argue for them to calm down and rely on discussion instead of violence, but they do not agree with his stance.

Because of the turbulence, military troops arrive to ensure safety. It is also decided by the County Administrative Board that the strikebreakers should be prohibited from working, but this information doesn't reach the upset locals, who decide to march to the locality where the strikebreakers are staying to get rid of them. When the military troops fail in persuading the participants to stop, they open fire.

Five people are killed and five more are injured. Among the dead are Harald Andersson, Nisse and a young girl who had only been a bystander. Around the same time, Anna returns from Stockholm where she has had an abortion arranged by her mother. When Kjell is told about the abortion by Anna's father, he interprets it as if he isn't accepted within the bourgeois idyll.

A general strike is proclaimed. While Kjell is occupied as a strike guard, he meets the man who had previously argued with his father. The man claims that the father wasn't innocent, since he had helped to divide the workers. Not until now they were united. Kjell does not agree, instead claiming that education is the key to a better society. Slowly, the Andersson family recover from the loss, and eventually the factories open again.

== Selected cast ==
- Peter Schildt as Kjell Andersson
- Kerstin Tidelius as Karin Andersson
- Roland Hedlund as Harald Andersson
- Marie De Geer as Anna Björklund
- Anita Björk as Hedvig Björklund
- Olof Bergström as Olof Björklund
- Jonas Bergström as Nisse
- Tommy Malmström as angry young communist
- Olle Björling as strikebreaker
- Pierre Lindstedt as supervisor
- Stefan Feierbach as Åke Andersson
- Martin Widerberg as Martin Andersson

== Reception ==
=== Critical response ===
Ådalen 31 has an approval rating of 88% on review aggregator website Rotten Tomatoes, based on 8 reviews, and an average rating of 7.8/10. "Beautiful yet uninspired" was the assessment of Pauline Kael. "Lush and lyrical as it is, it’s fundamentally didactic, with stereotyped social-realist characters. And because Widerberg seems to work best in vignettes and to have architectural problems when he’s working on such a large scale, his argument isn’t clear; he makes the little points but not the big ones. So when the violence erupts, we don’t really understand its political significance – we’re left 'appreciating' it, in a rather embarrassed way, for its pictorial values."

=== Awards and nominations ===
Widerberg won the award for Best Direction, and actor Roland Hedlund won for Best Actor at the 6th Guldbagge Awards. Internationally, the film won the Special Grand Prize of the Jury at the 1969 Cannes Film Festival and was nominated for both the Academy Award for Best Foreign Language Film and the Golden Globe Award for Best Foreign Language Film. It won the prestigious Grand Prix of the Belgian Film Critics Association.

== See also ==
- List of submissions to the 42nd Academy Awards for Best Foreign Language Film
- List of Swedish submissions for the Academy Award for Best Foreign Language Film
