= 22nd British Academy Film Awards =

1969 film awards ceremony

- Date: 26 March 1969

Highlights
- Best Film: The Graduate
- Best Actor: Spencer Tracy; Guess Who's Coming to Dinner
- Best Actress: Katharine Hepburn; Guess Who's Coming to Dinner and The Lion in Winter
- Most awards: The Graduate (5)
- Most nominations: The Lion in Winter & Oliver! (8)

The 22nd British Academy Film Awards, given by the British Academy of Film and Television Arts on 26 March 1969, honoured the best films of 1968. The Graduate won Best Film, Best Director, Best Screenplay and Best Editor, plus Most Promising Newcomer for Dustin Hoffman.

== Winners and nominees ==
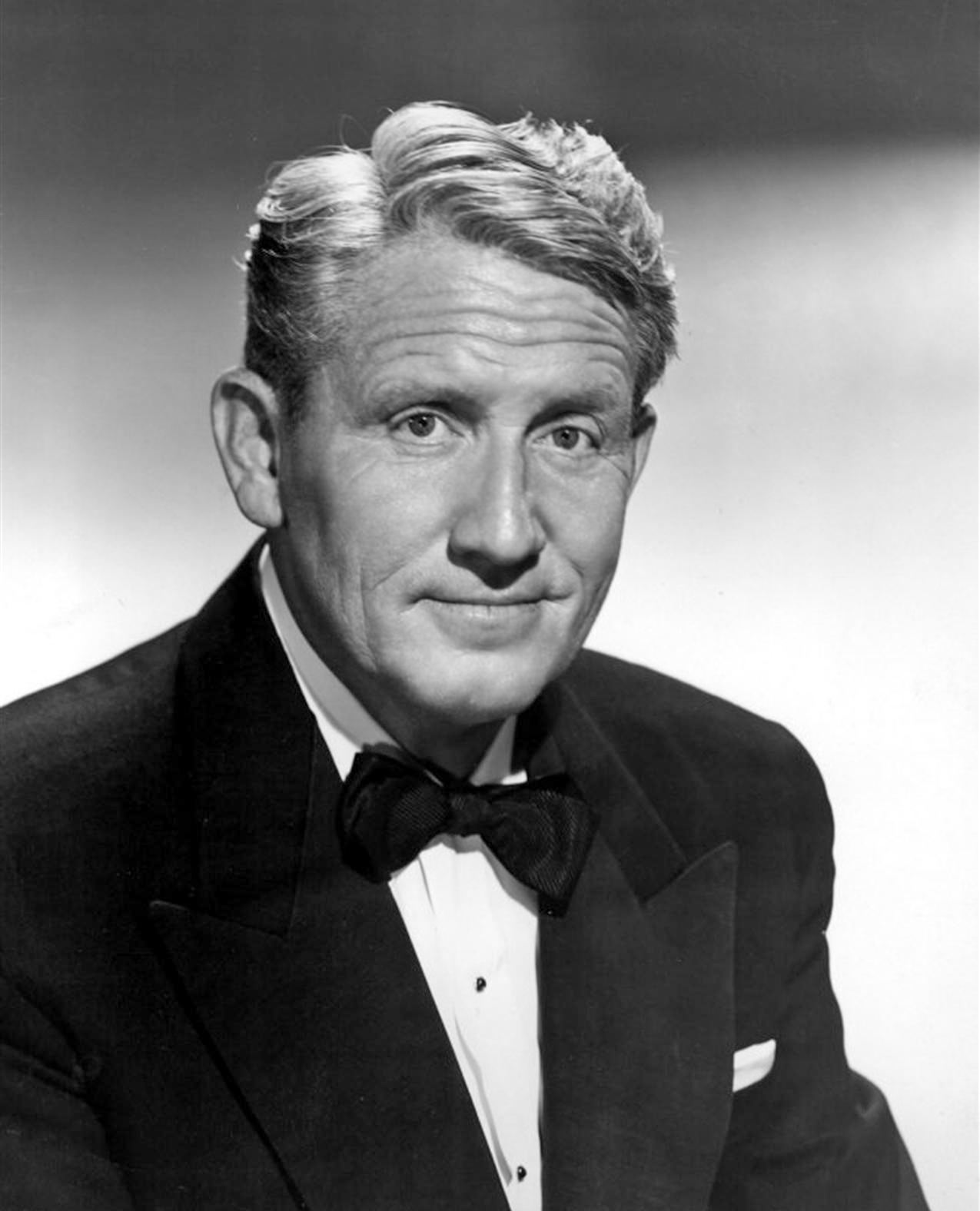
Spencer Tracy, Best Actor winner

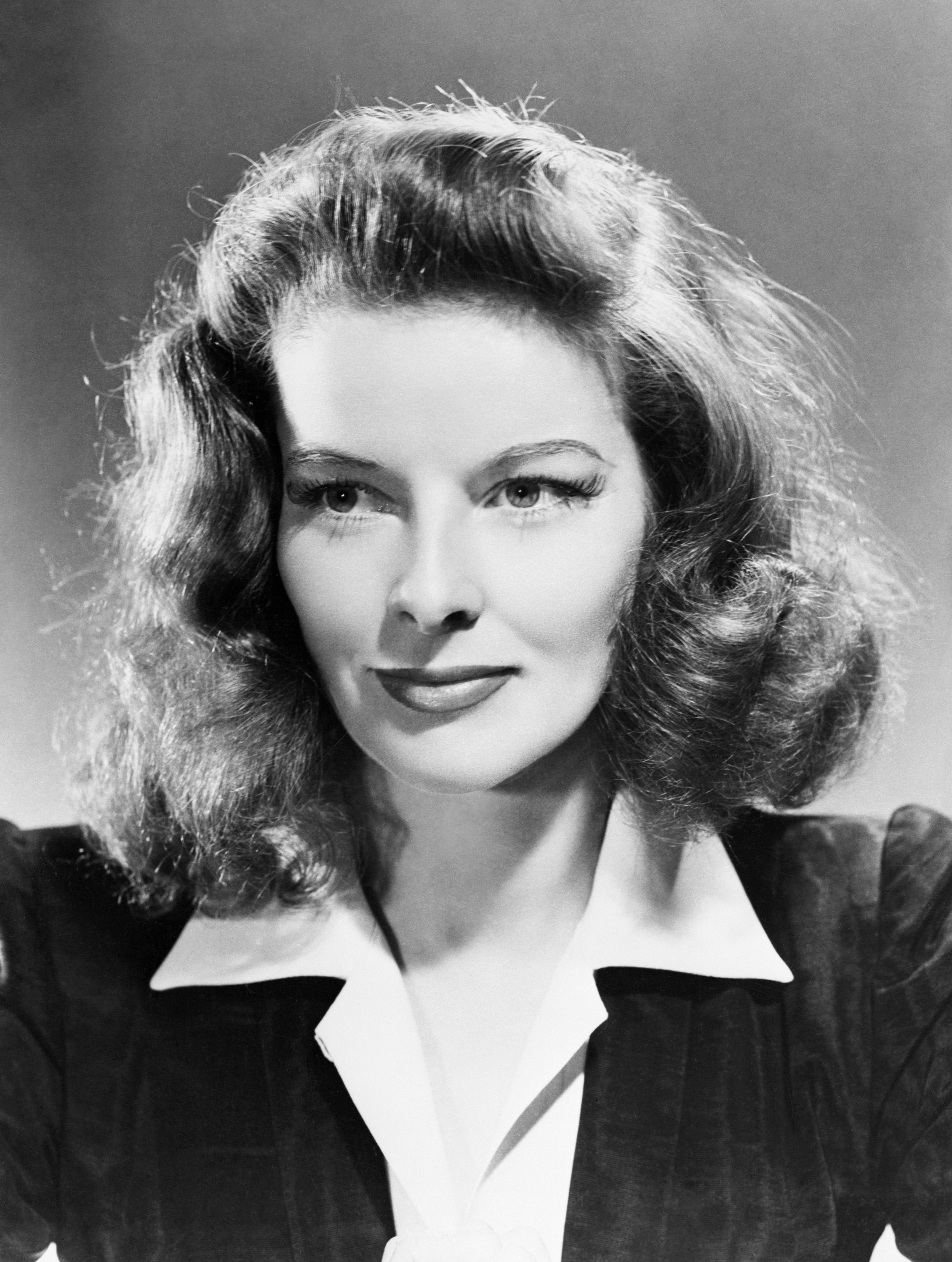
Katharine Hepburn, Best Actress winner

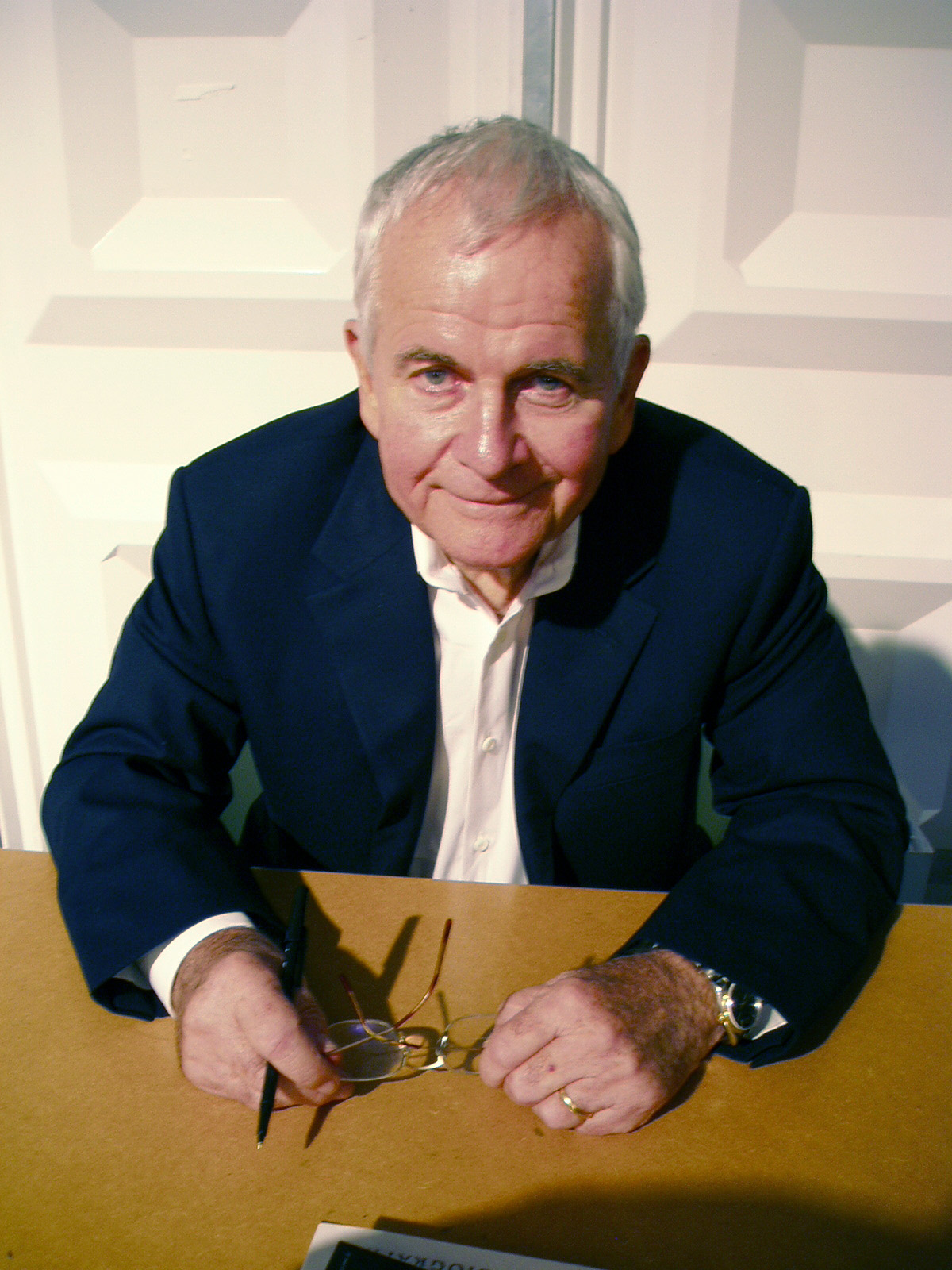
Ian Holm, Best Supporting Actor winner

Dustin Hoffman, Best Newcomer winner

| Best Film The Graduate – Mike Nichols: 2001: A Space Odyssey – Stanley Kubrick; Closely Watched Trains – Jiří Menzel; Oliver! – Carol Reed | Best Direction Mike Nichols – The Graduate: Carol Reed – Oliver!; Franco Zeffirelli – Romeo and Juliet; Lindsay Anderson – if.... |
| Best Actor in a Leading Role Spencer Tracy – Guess Who's Coming to Dinner as Matt Drayton: Nicol Williamson – The Bofors Gun as Gunner O'Rourke; Ron Moody – Oliver! as Fagin; Trevor Howard – The Charge of the Light Brigade as James Brudenell | Best Actress in a Leading Role Katharine Hepburn – Guess Who's Coming to Dinner as Christina Drayton and The Lion in Winter as Eleanor: Anne Bancroft – The Graduate as Mrs. Robinson; Catherine Deneuve – Belle de Jour as Séverine Serizy; Joanne Woodward – Rachel, Rachel as Rachel Cameron |
| Best Actor in a Supporting Role Ian Holm – The Bofors Gun as Gunner Flynn: Anthony Hopkins – The Lion in Winter as Richard I; George Segal – No Way to Treat a Lady as Morris Brummel; John McEnery – Romeo and Juliet as Mercutio | Best Actress in a Supporting Role Billie Whitelaw – Charlie Bubbles as Lottie Bubbles; Billie Whitelaw – Twisted Nerve as Joan Harper: Pat Heywood – Romeo and Juliet as Nurse; Simone Signoret – Games as Lisa; Virginia Maskell – Interlude as Antonia |
| Best Screenplay The Graduate – Calder Willingham and Buck Henry: Guess Who's Coming to Dinner – William Rose; if.... – David Sherwin; The Lion in Winter – James Goldman | Best Cinematography 2001: A Space Odyssey – Geoffrey Unsworth: The Charge of the Light Brigade – David Watkin; Elvira Madigan – Jörgen Persson; The Lion in Winter – Douglas Slocombe |
| Best Costume Design Romeo and Juliet – Danilo Donati: The Charge of the Light Brigade – David Walker; The Lion in Winter – Margaret Furse; Oliver! – Phyllis Dalton | Best Editing The Graduate – Sam O'Steen: The Charge of the Light Brigade – Kevin Brownlow; Oliver! – Ralph Kemplen; Romeo and Juliet – Reginald Mills |
| Best Original Music The Lion in Winter – John Barry: The Charge of the Light Brigade – John Addison; Live for Life – Francis Lai; Romeo and Juliet – Nino Rota | Best Production Design 2001: A Space Odyssey – Anthony Masters, Harry Lange and Ernest Archer: The Charge of the Light Brigade – Ted Marshall; Oliver! – John Box; Romeo and Juliet – Lorenzo Mongiardino |
| Best Sound 2001: A Space Odyssey – Winston Ryder: The Charge of the Light Brigade – Simon Kaye; Closely Watched Trains – Jiri Pavlik; The Lion in Winter – Chris Greenham and Simon Kaye; Oliver! – John Cox and Bob Jones | Best Short Animation Pas de deux – Norman McLaren: The Hand – Jiří Trnka; The House That Jack Built – Ron Tunis; The Question – John Halas |
| Best Documentary In Need of Special Care – Jonathan Stedall: Inside North Vietnam – Felix Greene; Music! – Michael Tuchner; A Plague On Your Children – Adrian Malone | Best Specialised Film The Threat in the Water – Richard Bigham: Carbon – Peter De Normanville; Genetics and Plant Breeding – David Morphet; The Kurer Anchor System – Eric Horrison |
| Most Promising Newcomer to Leading Film Roles Dustin Hoffman – The Graduate as Benjamin Braddock: Jack Wild – Oliver! as Artful Dodger; Katharine Ross – The Graduate as Elaine Robinson; Pia Degermark – Elvira Madigan as Elvira Madigan | United Nations Award Guess Who's Coming to Dinner – Stanley Kramer: 2001: A Space Odyssey – Stanley Kubrick; In Need of Special Care – Jonathan Stedall; The Lion in Winter – Anthony Harvey |

== Statistics ==
Films that received multiple nominations
| Nominations | Film |
|---|---|
| 8 | The Lion in Winter |
| 8 | Oliver! |
| 7 | The Charge of the Light Brigade |
| 7 | The Graduate |
| 7 | Romeo and Juliet |
| 5 | 2001: A Space Odyssey |
| 4 | Guess Who's Coming to Dinner |
| 2 | The Bofors Gun |
| 2 | Closely Watched Trains |
| 2 | Elvira Madigan |
| 2 | if.... |
| 2 | In Need of Special Case |

Films that received multiple awards
| Awards | Film |
|---|---|
| 5 | The Graduate |
| 3 | 2001: A Space Odyssey |
| 3 | Guess Who's Coming to Dinner |
| 2 | The Lion in Winter |

== See also ==
- 41st Academy Awards
- 21st Directors Guild of America Awards
- 26th Golden Globe Awards
- 21st Writers Guild of America Awards
