= The Vampire Happening =

- German film poster for The Vampire Happening
- Directed by: Freddie Francis
- Written by: August Rieger; Karl-Heinz Hummel
- Produced by: Pier A. Caminnecci
- Cinematography: Gerard Vandenberg
- Edited by: Alfred Srp
- Music by: Jerry van Rooyen
- Release date: June 4, 1971 (West Germany)
- Running time: 102 minutes
- Country: West Germany
- Language: German

The Vampire Happening (German: Gebissen wird nur nachts, lit. They only bite at night) is a 1971 West German comedy horror film directed by Freddie Francis.

== Plot ==
Betty Williams, an American film actress has inherited a castle in Transylvania. But what she doesn't know is that her ancestor, the late Baroness Clarimonde Catani, is a vampire who has been sleeping in her tomb at the family vault for many years. Betty and Clarimonde look exactly the same, except that Clarimonde has black hair and Betty is blonde. Clarimonde died at an age similar to Betty's present age and like all vampires her body is well preserved. A manservant in the castle knows that Clarimonde is a vampire and informs Betty. Betty doesn't believe that vampires exist and unintentionally sets Clarimonde free. Clarimonde starts causing mayhem by sucking blood from horny men. After some time Betty and her boyfriend find out about Clarimonde and other vampires as well. They goes to a party for vampires where Count Dracula is the guest of honour. When they are exposed as mortals, Clarimonde saves them from the other vampires. Betty's manservant, who also accompanied them to the party, sets the clock back an hour, causing the vampires to return to their coffins too late to avoid the lethal sunlight, but Betty unintentionally switches place with Clarimonde. While Betty stays in the castle, Clarimonde goes to America. The movie ends with Clarimonde sucking blood from a man.

== Cast ==
- Pia Degermark as Betty Williams/Baroness Clarimonde Catani
- Thomas Hunter as Jens Larsen
- Yvor Murillo as Josef
- Ingrid van Bergen as Miss Niessen
- Joachim Kemmer as Martin
- Oskar Wegrostek as Abt
- Ferdy Mayne as Count Dracula
- Lyvia Bauer as Gabrielle
- Daria Damar as Kirsten
- Kay Williams
- Michael Janisch
- Toni Wagner
- Raoul Retzer

== Production ==
In the early 1970s, Italian producer Pier A. Caminnecci was looking for a film for his wife Pia Degermark whose previous film Elvira Madigan (1967) was a critical and financial success. Caminnecci set up an international production for her in West Germany directed by British director Freddie Francis and written by German screenwriters August Rieger and Karl-Heinz Hummel The script features a sub-plot based on Theophile Gautier's short story "La Morte Amoureuse."

Francis later stated:

I was aware from the start of the difficulties in shooting a horror parody. I really believed that I was working with normal people in the movie industry, and thought I could have made a decent film. With time, I became aware that the producer was an imbecile who treated the project like a home movie. He wanted to do the casting, make cameos in the film, and wanted his wife as an actress. It was a disaster which I can't say anything serious about.

== Reception ==
The film was not well received. AllMovie gave the film one and a half stars out of five, stating that it is "not considered to be one of the crown jewels of the genre" In his book Comedy-Horror Films:A Chronological History, author Bruce G. Hallenbeck praised the visuals but referred to the film as "sort of a ripoff of Polanski's The Fearless Vampire Killers" which "doesn't come within lightyears of Polanski's vision".

== See also ==
- List of comedy films of the 1970s
- List of horror films of 1971
- List of German films: 1970s

== Works cited ==
- Browning, John Edgar; Picart, Caroline Joan (2010). Dracula in Visual Media:Film, Television, Comic Book and Electronic Game Appearances, 1921-2010. McFarland. ISBN 978-0786433650.
- Hallenbeck, Bruce G. (2009). Comedy-Horror Films:A Chronological History, 1914-2008. McFarland. ISBN 978-0786433322.
