= Thoroughly Modern Millie (song) =

- 7-inch US single picture sleeve

Single by Julie Andrews

from the album Thoroughly Modern Millie
- B-side: "Jimmy"
- Released: 1967
- Genre: Musical, show tune
- Length: 2:30
- Label: Decca
- Songwriters: Sammy Cahn, James Van Heusen

Julie Andrews singles chronology
"Chim Chim Cher-ee" (1965)	"Thoroughly Modern Millie" (1967)	"Don't Go in the Lion's Cage Tonight" (1967)

"Thoroughly Modern Millie" is a song composed by Sammy Cahn (lyrics) and Jimmy Van Heusen (music) for the 1967 musical film of the same name, a faux-1920s musical comedy directed by George Roy Hill and produced by Ross Hunter. The film starred Julie Andrews, Carol Channing, and Mary Tyler Moore, blending original compositions with period-appropriate standards.

The song was performed by Julie Andrews, who starred in the film as the titular character. Released as a single by Decca Records, it features "Jimmy" as the B-side. The song is an upbeat, jazzy number that mirrors the film's lighthearted tone. At the same time the lyrics playfully depict the protagonist's embrace of modernity. In 1996, the song, along with the instrumental track "Prelude", was included in Andrews' Rhino compilation album The Best of Julie Andrews: Thoroughly Modern Julie.

== Critical reception ==
Cash Box described the track as a "bright, up-tempo, bouncy, light-hearted romp" and its b-side as a "smooth, easy-going romancer". Record World selected the song as a "Single Pick of the Week", describing it as a "pristine perkiness", and writing that it "should click with the masses". Cast Album Reviews called the song "admittedly catchy.

== Accolades ==
"Thoroughly Modern Millie" was nominated for the Golden Globe Award for Best Original Song at the 25th Golden Globe Awards (1967). The other nominees in the category were: "If Ever I Would Leave You" from Camelot (performed by Richard Harris, music by Frederick Loewe, lyrics by Alan Jay Lerner), which won the award; "Talk to the Animals" from Doctor Dolittle (performed by Rex Harrison, music and lyrics by Leslie Bricusse); "Circles in the Water (Des ronds dans l'eau)" from Live for Life (Vivre pour vivre) (music by Francis Lai, lyrics by Norman Gimbel); and "Please Don't Gamble with Love" from Ski Fever (music by Jerry Styner, lyrics by Guy Hemric).

The film's title song was also nominated for the Academy Award for Best Original Song at the 40th Academy Awards (1967). The other nominees were: "Talk to the Animals" from Doctor Dolittle, which won the Oscar; "The Eyes of Love" from Banning (music by Quincy Jones, lyrics by Bob Russell); "The Look of Love" from Casino Royale (music by Burt Bacharach, lyrics by Hal David); and "The Bare Necessities" from The Jungle Book (music and lyrics by Terry Gilkyson).

Awards and nominations for "Thoroughly Modern Millie"
Year	Award	Category	Result	Ref.
1968	25th Golden Globe Awards	Best Original Song	Nominated	
1968	40th Academy Awards	Best Original Song	Nominated	

== Commercial performance ==
On March 25, 1967, the single made its first appearance on the Billboard's Easy Listening chart—now known as the Adult Contemporary chart. The song eventually reached its peak position at number 3 on April 22. It remained on the chart for a total of 12 weeks.Additionally, it peaked at number 5 on the Record World Top Non-Rock chart.

== Charts ==
Weekly chart performance for "Thoroughly Modern Millie"
Chart (1967)	Peak position
US (Billboard Easy Listening)	3
US (Record World Top Non-Rock)	5
