= National Board of Review Awards 1967 =

Annual US film awards ceremony

39th National Board of Review Awards

December 31, 1967

The 39th National Board of Review Awards were announced on December 31, 1967.

== Top Ten Films ==
1. Far from the Madding Crowd
2. The Whisperers
3. Ulysses
4. In Cold Blood
5. The Family Way
6. The Taming of the Shrew
7. Doctor Dolittle
8. The Graduate
9. The Comedians
10. Accident

== Top Foreign Films ==
1. Elvira Madigan
2. The Hunt
3. Africa Addio
4. Persona
5. Die Gentlemen bitten zur Kasse (The Great British Train Robbery)

== Winners ==
- Best Film: Far from the Madding Crowd
- Best Foreign Film: Elvira Madigan
- Best Actor: Peter Finch (Far from the Madding Crowd)
- Best Actress: Edith Evans (The Whisperers)
- Best Supporting Actor: Paul Ford (The Comedians)
- Best Supporting Actress: Marjorie Rhodes (The Family Way)
- Best Director: Richard Brooks (In Cold Blood)
