= The Taming of the Shrew (1967 film) =

1967 film by Franco Zeffirelli

- Original film poster
- Directed by: Franco Zeffirelli
- Screenplay by: Franco Zeffirelli; Paul Dehn; Suso Cecchi d'Amico
- Based on: The Taming of the Shrew by William Shakespeare
- Produced by: Elizabeth Taylor
- Starring: Elizabeth Taylor; Richard Burton; Cyril Cusack; Michael Hordern; Alfred Lynch; Alan Webb; Victor Spinetti; Michael York; Natasha Pyne
- Cinematography: Oswald Morris
- Edited by: Peter Taylor
- Music by: Nino Rota
- Distributed by: Columbia Pictures
- Release dates: February 27, 1967 (Royal Film Performance); March 8, 1967 (U.S.); March 23, 1967 (Italy)
- Running time: 122 minutes
- Countries: Italy; United States; United Kingdom
- Language: English
- Budget: $4 million
- Box office: $8,000,000 (North America) $12,000,000 (worldwide)

The Taming of the Shrew is a 1967 historical romance comedy film directed by Franco Zeffirelli, based on William Shakespeare's play about a courtship between two strong-willed people in 16th-century Italy. The film stars Elizabeth Taylor (who also produced) as Kate and Richard Burton as Petruchio, who were both nominated for BAFTA Awards for their acting. It features Cyril Cusack, Michael Hordern, Michael York, and Victor Spinetti in supporting roles.

The Taming of the Shrew premiered with a Royal Film Performance on 27 February 1967. At the 40th Academy Awards, it was nominated for Best Costume Design and Best Art Direction – Set Decoration. Burton was nominated for the Golden Globe Award for Best Actor – Comedy or Musical, and the film was nominated for Best Motion Picture – Comedy or Musical. Burton and Taylor also received BAFTA nominations.

This was one of three Shakespeare film adaptations directed by Zeffirelli, followed by Romeo and Juliet in 1968, and Hamlet in 1990.

== Plot ==
Baptista Minola is attempting to marry off his two daughters; however, he will marry off his youngest, Bianca only if someone will marry his eldest, Katherina. Katherina is an ill-tempered and shrewish woman, but a lusty young nobleman, Petruchio, takes on the challenge of taming and marrying her. A subplot involves the wooing of Bianca by several suitors including handsome Lucentio, foppish Hortensio, and elderly Gremio.

== Cast ==
- Elizabeth Taylor as Kate
- Richard Burton as Petruchio
- Cyril Cusack as Grumio
- Michael Hordern as Baptista Minola
- Alfred Lynch as Tranio
- Alan Webb as Gremio
- Michael York as Lucentio
- Natasha Pyne as Bianca
- Victor Spinetti as Hortensio
- Roy Holder as Biondello
- Mark Dignam as Vincentio
- Giancarlo Cobelli as The Priest
- Vernon Dobtcheff as The Pedant
- Ken Parry as The Tailor
- Anthony Gardener as The Haberdasher
- Bice Valori as The Widow
- Gianni Magni as Curtis
- Lino Capolicchio as Gregory
- Roberto Antonelli as Philip
- Alberto Bonucci as Nathaniel
- Milena Vukotic as Antonia

== Production ==
The film was originally intended to be a vehicle for Sophia Loren and Marcello Mastroianni. Taylor and Burton put over a million dollars into the production and, instead of a salary, took a percentage of profits. It was shot entirely at Dino De Laurentiis' studios in Rome.

Unlike her husband, Taylor had never performed Shakespeare before, and she was said to be very nervous prior to the beginning of the shoot. As she found her way into the role, and became more confident, she asked Franco Zeffirelli if she could shoot everything from the first day of shooting again, as she did not think her performance was up to scratch. Zefferilli assured her it was, but she was persistent, and on the last day of principal photography, the entire first day was shot again.

Rostislav Doboujinsky was Head of the film's Specialist Design Department.

== Release ==
The film's premiere was the Royal Film Performance at the Odeon Leicester Square in London on February 27, 1967, attended by Princess Margaret, Countess of Snowdon. It opened the following day at the Columbia and Royalty cinemas in London. It had its US premiere at the Coronet Theatre in New York City on March 8, 1967, starting its regular run the following day.

== Reception ==
=== Box office ===
The Taming of the Shrew grossed $8 million in North America, earning $3,540,000 in theatrical rentals during 1967, making it the 25th highest grossing picture of 1967. The film grossed $12 million worldwide.

=== Critical reception ===
The film received positive reviews from modern critics. Review aggregator Rotten Tomatoes reports that 83% of professional critics gave the film a positive review, based on 23 reviews with an average rating of 7.5/10. The website's critical consensus states: "It may not be reverent enough for purists, but this Taming of the Shrew is too funny – and fun – for the rest of us to resist."

=== Awards and nominations ===
Award	Category	Nominee(s)	Result
Academy Awards	Best Art Direction	Art Direction: Lorenzo Mongiardino, John DeCuir, Elven Webb, and Giuseppe Mariani; Set Decoration: Dario Simoni and Luigi Gervasi	Nominated
Academy Awards	Best Costume Design	Danilo Donati and Irene Sharaff	Nominated
British Academy Film Awards	Best British Actor	Richard Burton	Nominated
British Academy Film Awards	Best British Actress	Elizabeth Taylor	Nominated
British Society of Cinematographers Awards	Best Cinematography in a Theatrical Feature Film	Oswald Morris	Won
David di Donatello Awards	Best Production	The Taming of the Shrew	Won (Note: Tied with The Tiger and the Pussycat.)
David di Donatello Awards	Best Foreign Actor	Richard Burton	Won (Note: Tied with Peter O'Toole for The Night of the Generals.)
David di Donatello Awards	Best Foreign Actress	Elizabeth Taylor	Won (Note: Tied with Julie Christie for Doctor Zhivago.)
Golden Globe Awards	Best Motion Picture – Musical or Comedy	The Taming of the Shrew	Nominated
Golden Globe Awards	Best Actor in a Motion Picture – Musical or Comedy	Richard Burton	Nominated
Nastro d'Argento	Best Costume Design	Danilo Donati	Won
Nastro d'Argento	Best Production Design	Giuseppe Mariani	Nominated
National Board of Review Awards	Top Ten Films	The Taming of the Shrew	Won

== Comparison to source material ==
The film screenplay cuts most of the subplot of Lucentio and Bianca, and the entire Christopher Sly framing device. Other scenes are trimmed of dialogue, or have lines moved from one to another. The film also adds additional scenes, with little or no dialogue, focusing on Kate and Petruchio.

Taylor plays Kate's final, controversial speech without any obvious irony (such as Mary Pickford's wink in the 1929 film); however, her taming is apparently undercut by her quick exit from the banquet, which forces Burton's Petruchio to chase after her amid jeers from the other men. According to Harold Bloom's take on the play, Katherina is "advising women how to rule absolutely, while feigning obedience".

== See also ==
- List of American films of 1967
