= Elvira Madigan (1967 film) =

- Directed by: Bo Widerberg
- Written by: Bo Widerberg
- Based on: Sorgeliga saker hända by Johan Lindström Saxon
- Produced by: Waldemar Bergendahl
- Starring: Pia Degermark; Thommy Berggren
- Cinematography: Jörgen Persson
- Edited by: Bo Widerberg
- Production company: Europa Film
- Distributed by: Europa Film
- Release dates: 24 April 1967 (Sweden); 30 October 1967 (United States)
- Running time: 91 minutes
- Country: Sweden
- Languages: Danish; Swedish
- Box office: $2.1 million (US/Canada) (rentals) $9 million (U.S./Canada)

Elvira Madigan is a 1967 Swedish romantic drama film directed by Bo Widerberg and starring Pia Degermark and Thommy Berggren. It is loosely based on the tragedy of the Danish slackrope dancer Hedvig Jensen, working under the stage name of Elvira Madigan at her stepfather's travelling circus, and her relationship with Swedish nobleman lieutenant Sixten Sparre.

The film was released in Sweden on 24 April 1967. In the United States, the film premiered on 30 October 1967. The film was Widerberg's first to have commercial success overseas. At that year's Cannes Film Festival, Degermark won the award for Best Actress.

== Plot ==
In the summer of 1889, tightrope walker Hedvig Jensen and Swedish lieutenant Sixten Sparre are in the Danish countryside, having run away together. They are both fleeing their lives—Sparre from the military and his wife and children, Hedvig from the traveling circus at which she is the star attraction—to be together. The couple are keeping their whereabouts private because of the scorn their scandalous relationship incurs, as well as to evade Sparre's regiment, who are in search of the deserter. Hedvig feels she has reclaimed her identity with Sparre and asks him to call her by her real name instead of her stage name, Elvira Madigan.

Despite the couple's hiding their identities at a hotel, they are found out when authorities find the buttons on Sparre’s military uniform discarded in a field. A kindly hotel cook helps the couple to sneak away before they can be apprehended. Kristoffer, a friend from Sparre's regiment, manages to locate the couple. He tries to persuade Sparre to come back, but Sparre insists he is a changed man due to Hedvig’s influence and is now "on the women's side", embracing more idealistic views and no longer taking pride in military matters. Kristoffer makes a last-ditch effort to get Sparre to return by telling him his wife attempted suicide, but Sparre believes this to be a lie to break up his relationship with Hedvig. He renounces his friend and continues on with Hedvig.

The couple resume their idyllic summer staying at various hotels and inns, but as their financial resources dwindle, they find themselves having to procure money wherever they can. Sparre wins money by gambling, while Hedvig gets paid to entertain a party with her dancing and sells a picture of herself drawn by Toulouse-Lautrec. She suggests Sparre look for a job, but he claims as a deserter, he would not be able to find work. The couple have an argument over the realities of their precarious situation. Sparre apologizes to Hedvig and the two reconcile. However, they have gone days without eating. Having mutually agreed on a suicide pact, they set out for one last picnic together, with Sparre packing a gun in the basket. After an emotional moment together, Sparre attempts to shoot Hedvig, but he cannot bring himself to do it. Later, as Hedvig chases a butterfly in the fields, smiling as she did in the early days of their romance, Sparre musters the will to honor the pact. He shoots her dead and then kills himself. The deaths take place offscreen and only the gunshots are heard.

== Cast ==
- Pia Degermark as Hedvig Jensen, "Elvira Madigan"
  - Yvonne Ingdal as Elvira Madigan's voice (uncredited)
- Thommy Berggren as Lt. Sixten Sparre
- Lennart Malmer as Kristoffer
- Cleo Jensen as Cleo, the cook

== Production ==
A film based on the story of Elvira Madigan and Sixten Sparre was first released in Sweden in 1943. Director Bo Widerberg wanted to tell the story in modern terms, although it still strayed from the real story by adding a suicide pact between the Elvira and Sixten. "I was interested in the idea of the officer and the circus girl. I wanted to prove that their idea was insane, that you can't cut off relations with society and get along in the grass, alone," said Widerberg.

Widerberg cast Pia Degermark after seeing her in a newspaper photo dancing with Sweden's crown prince. For the role of Sixten, Widerberg cast Thommy Berggren, a frequent collaborator on his films.

The film was shot in an improvisational style, with the script consisting of only 25 pages. Widerberg directed Degermark and Berggren by going over each scene with them in detail and then shooting it without a rehearsal. Said Widerberg, "My method was to allow Pia and Thommy all the time they wanted for each scene. They could take long pauses before each line. Then I edited the pauses out of the film without losing the clear sense that each scene was played as a whole. I also wanted them to experience personally some of the things that were happening to the characters they were playing."

The production crew was minimal and consisted of only eight people—Widerberg, the two principal actors, and five technicians. Many camera shots were handheld and shot with only natural light. An admirer of Pierre-Auguste Renoir, Widerberg incorporated visual homages to his paintings.

== Music ==
The soundtrack features Géza Anda playing the Andante from Piano Concerto No. 21 in C by Mozart, which is now sometimes referred to as the "Elvira Madigan" Concerto, as well as Vivaldi's Four Seasons.

Anda's Deutsche Grammophon LP of Concerto No. 21 was re-issued with a cover showing Pia Degermark in costume in a still from the film.

== Critical response ==
Elvira Madigan received critical acclaim, with multiple critics lauding the beauty and artistry of its shots. Bosley Crowther of The New York Times declared, "EXQUISITE is only the first word that surges in my mind as an appropriate description of 'Elvira Madigan,' a Swedish film by Bo Widerberg that was put on at the late show in Philharmonic Hall last night. For exquisite it is in all the lovely and delicate sense of the word as used to define the felicities of sensuous experience." Roger Ebert gave the film 4/4 stars and wrote, "Elvira Madigan is indeed remarkably beautiful, Almost every frame would make a painting, and yet the film is alive and cinematic, not simply photographs of pretty pictures." In the United States, the film opened two months after the film Bonnie and Clyde, leading some to compare the films' similarities and differences in story.

Less positive responses "denounced the naive sentimentality of the storyline and accused Widerberg of having created an unintentionally amusing parody of high art". The Time Out Film Guide said the film is a "candidate for the prettiest pic ever award. ... you may be enchanted by it if you don't laugh yourself sick."

Many have attributed the film's resonance at the time in part to its anti-war and romanticist themes, which appealed to the 1960s counterculture during which the film was released. Describing it as breathing the "hippie mid-sixties", Edgardo Cozarinsky wrote: "Though the lovers are there as early instances of drop-outs, and several contemporary readings effortlessly emerge, Widerberg's real concern is with the sensuous presence of cream and berry juice on lips and fingertips…this affirmation in the face of death carries ... the weight of a modest but combative ideological point".

In a 2005 review, critic Lee Broughton wrote, "Nearly forty years on, Elvira Madigan still has the power to impress both as an Art House film and a keenly observed love story." David Parkinson of Empire said, "While Jorgen Persson's luminous naturally lit cinematography is invariably cited as the main reason for the enduring appeal of this fact-based melodrama, Widerberg captures the small humiliations of poverty with as much fidelity as the colours of summer, which are made all the more enchanting by the accompaniment of Vivaldi's Violin Concerto and Mozart's Piano Concerto No.21."

== Awards and nominations ==
- BAFTA Awards
  - Best Cinematography (Persson, nominated)
  - Most Promising Newcomer to Leading Film Roles (Degermark, nominated)
- Cannes Film Festival
  - Best Actress (Degermark, won)
  - Golden Palm (Widerberg, nominated)
- Golden Globe Awards
  - Best Foreign-Language Foreign Film (nominated)
  - Most Promising Newcomer - Female (Degermark, nominated)
- National Board of Review
  - Best Foreign Language Film (won)

== Home media ==
In June 2005, Arrow Films released Elvira Madigan on DVD. In August 2023, The Criterion Collection released Elvira Madigan as a Blu-ray disc in a 4-box set alongside Widerberg's films The Baby Carriage, Raven's End, and Ådalen 31.

== See also ==
- Elvira Madigan (1943 film)
