= Ådalen shootings =

1931 Swedish anti-labour massacre

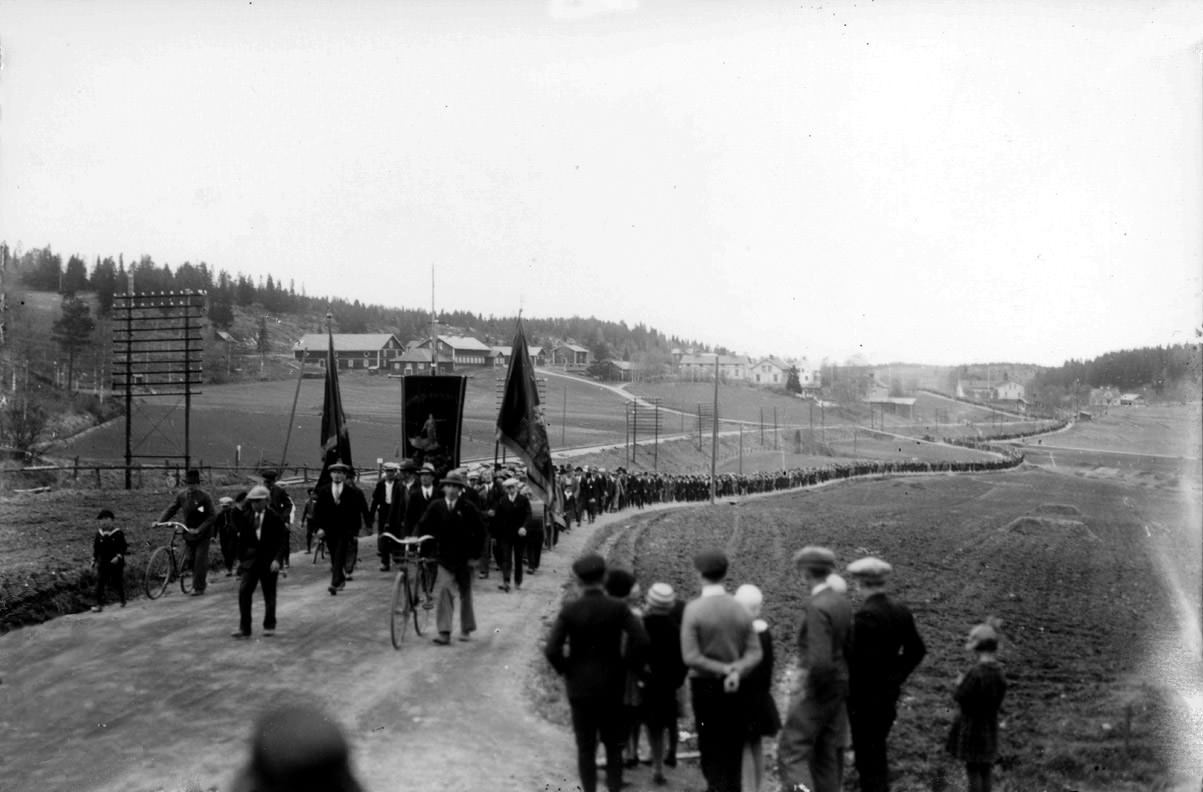
- Image of the demonstration in Ådalen prior to the shootings.
- Location: 62°52′53″N 17°52′24″E; Ådalen, Sweden
- Date: 14 May 1931
- Target: Striking civilians
- Attack type: Mass shooting, police brutality
- Weapons: Small arms, including machine guns
- Deaths: 5
- Injuries: 5
- Perpetrator: Swedish Army
- Motive: Suppression of strikers

The Ådalen shootings (Swedish: skotten i Ådalen) was a series of events in and around the sawmill district of Ådalen, Kramfors Municipality, Ångermanland, Sweden, in May 1931. During a protest on 14 May, five people were killed by Swedish Army troops called in as reinforcements by the police.

== Background ==
As a response to a drawn-out industrial conflict over pay reductions at the pulp factory at Långrör, workers at other plants went on a sympathy strike. The owner of the Graninge company, Gerhard Versteegh, hired around 60 strike-breakers, who arrived in the village of Lunde in Ådalen on 12 May. The workers held a protest rally in Kramfors and marched to the Sandviken plant north of the town, where they approached and attacked some of the strike-breakers. Since the police had not been able to stop the attack, the County Administrative Board asked for the deployment of members of the military from Sollefteå to protect the strike-breakers. When the troops arrived in the late evening of 13 May, they were met by protesters, allegedly throwing stones.

== Confrontation ==
On 14 May, the unions held another rally, during which the attending workers decided to stop all work in the timber and pulp industries in Ådalen—a general strike. After the meeting, several thousand participants marched to the strike-breakers' quarters in Lunde, where the troops had been ordered to defend the strike-breakers. When they arrived in the village, a patrol of mounted troops tried unsuccessfully to stop them. In the confusion that followed, at least one man fell off his horse and another drew his pistol and fired warning shots while the patrol withdrew. The military commander, Captain Nils Mesterton, said later that he believed the demonstrators carried weapons since he heard shots as well as saw some of the mounted patrol bleeding. At a distance of less than 100 metres, he ordered his troops to fire, in accordance with orders from the present policeman in charge. They did, aiming as planned at the ground halfway between the line and the demonstrators. However, ricochets hit the gathered demonstrators, who scattered, and the captain ordered the machine gun to fire. Five people were shot dead: Viktor Eriksson, Erik Bergström, Evert Nygren, Sture Larsson and Eira Söderberg, a 20-year-old bystander. Five people were injured. An inquiry later concluded that there was no evidence that the workers were armed.

On that same day, the County Administrative Board had decided to prohibit the strike-breakers from working. Their decision did not reach the demonstrators until after the shooting. It is widely believed that the confrontation could have been avoided if the news had reached the marchers earlier. The Swedish Employers' Association later asked the Swedish Parliamentary Ombudsmen to review the decision.

== Aftermath ==
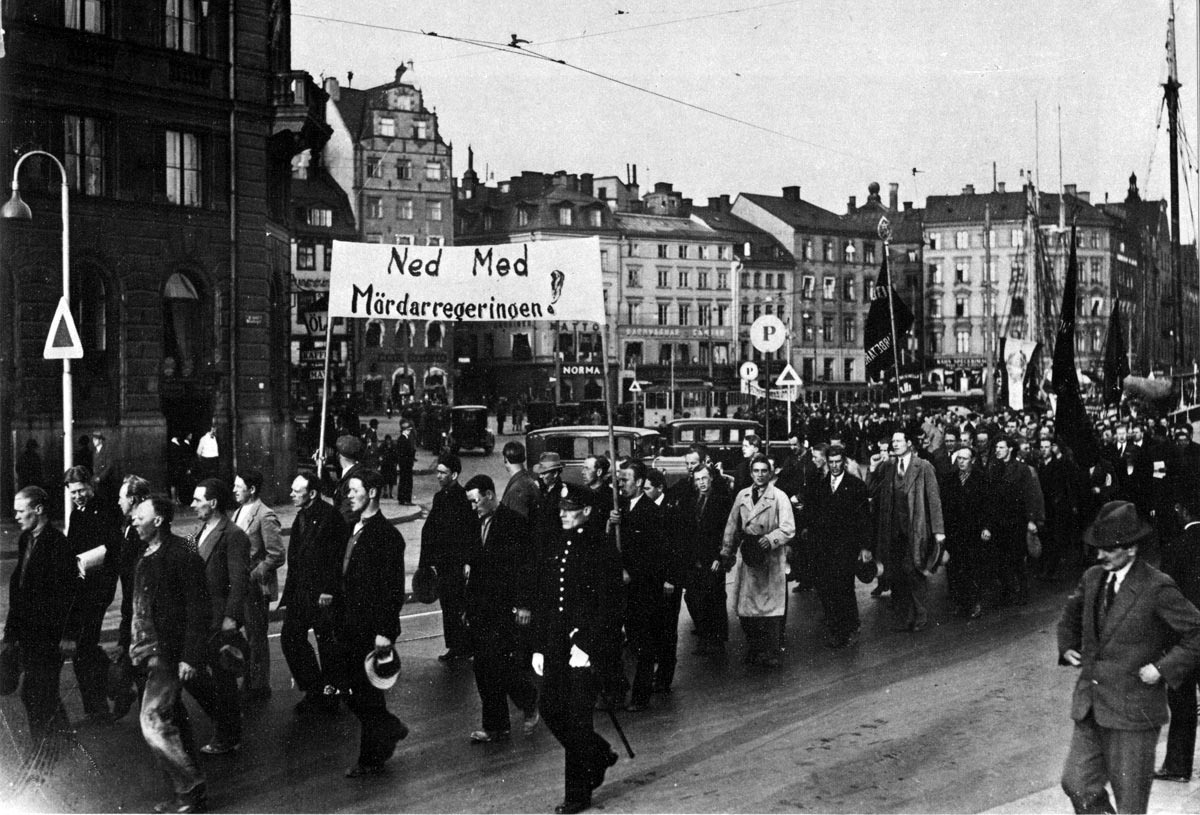
Demonstration in Stockholm in the aftermath of the Ådalen shootings, 1931. Sign reads "Down with the murderous government!"

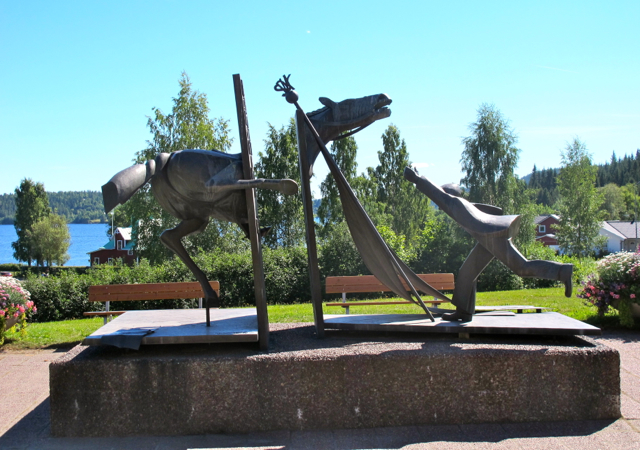
Monument to the victims by Lenny Clarhäll

The events spawned a national debate, deeply divided along political lines. The political left called the shootings "murder", while the right claimed that the military had been forced to open fire to defend themselves and the "willing workers" from the demonstrators. The publishers of several left-wing newspapers were convicted for violations of the limitations in the Freedom of the Press Act. Major demonstrations took place in Stockholm.

The county governor was tried in court but acquitted. Captains Mesterton and Beckman were initially convicted in a court martial, but were acquitted on appeal and that verdict was confirmed by the Supreme Court of Sweden. Sergeants Rask and Tapper, who were manning the machine gun, were also put on trial since repositioning had been performed with a loaded weapon, which was against army regulations. Rask was acquitted while Tapper was found guilty and sentenced to three days' confined arrest with loss of pay. On the other hand, several demonstrators had to face severe sentences: Axel Nordström, considered to be the leader, was sentenced to two and half years' imprisonment with hard labour. No damages were awarded to the wounded demonstrators or to the families of the five dead.

The government, under the liberal prime minister, Carl Gustaf Ekman, replaced the county governor and launched an investigation into the event. The investigation, with representatives from both employers and trade unions, later concluded that the military was highly unfit to uphold public order in similar situations. The use of the military against civilians was more strictly regulated, but the legislation was on the books until it was repealed by the 1969 Riksdag. However, there was broad political agreement not to use military force against civilians. The Ådalen shootings were still a concern in the discussions after the 9/11 events in the US, when military support to the police was considered. Therefore, the subsequent legislation that allowed the military to take part in anti-terrorism actions contained several safeguards. The military must be under command of the police, as they were in Ådalen in 1931, and legislation specifically says that the military cannot be used against demonstrations. There was still concern that these safeguards would not be enough.

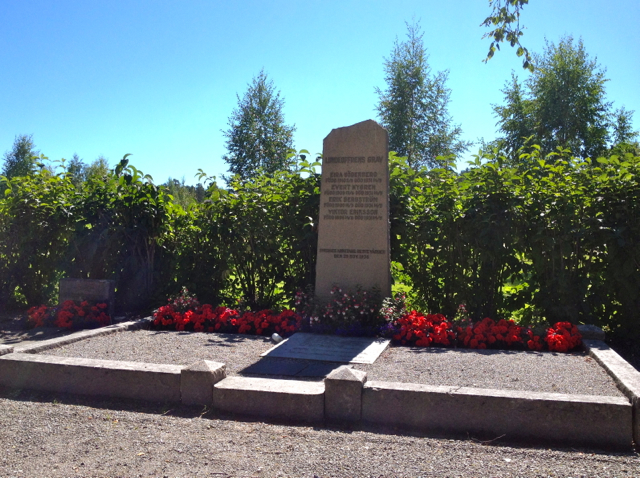
The grave of the four workers buried at the Gudmundrå church in Kramfors

At the time of the 1931 events, it was not possible to call in police reinforcements from outside the county. Thus, army assistance was the only recourse available to a county governor when the county's police force would be insufficient to deal with large-scale events. The shootings highlighted the inadequacy of this state of affairs. One effect of the Ådalen shootings was the formation of a national police force in 1933.

The workers' movement, in spite of the various factions being divided on exactly how to place the blame for what occurred, held a common funeral for the four victims at the Gudmunrå church in Kramfors, where Rickard Sandler (himself born in Ådalen) was the official representative for both government and Swedish Social Democratic Party. Erik Blomberg wrote the poem on the stone:

Here rests
a Swedish worker
fallen in a time of peace
unarmed defenceless
Fusilladed
by bullets unknown
The crime was hunger
Never forget him

Här vilar
en svensk arbetare
stupad i fredstid
vapenlös värnlös
Arkebuserad
av okända kulor
Brottet var hunger
Glöm honom aldrig

== Coverage in film ==
In 1969, the Swedish filmmaker Bo Widerberg told the story of the events in his film Ådalen 31 (released as Adalen Riots in the US). Partly thanks to the film and partly through the persistent use of the events in political debate, the Ådalen shootings are still well known in Sweden, and are sometimes referred to in connection with violent clashes between demonstrators and police such as the 2001 EU summit protests in Gothenburg.

The incident is also mentioned several times in the 1979 Swedish comedy film Repmånad.

== See also ==
- Anti-union violence
- Kent State shootings, similar incident involving soldiers shooting at unarmed civilians with fatal consequences
