= The Looking Glass War (film) =

1970 film by Frank Pierson

- Theatrical release poster
- Directed by: Frank Pierson
- Written by: Frank Pierson
- Based on: The Looking Glass War by John le Carré
- Produced by: John Box
- Starring: Christopher Jones; Pia Degermark; Ralph Richardson
- Cinematography: Austin Dempster
- Edited by: Willy Kemplen
- Music by: Angela Morley (as Wally Stott)
- Color process: Eastmancolor
- Production company: Frankovich Productions
- Distributed by: Columbia Pictures
- Release dates: 2 January 1970 (London); 8 February 1970 (United Kingdom); 4 February 1970 (New York City)
- Running time: 107 minutes
- Country: United Kingdom
- Languages: English; German

The Looking Glass War is a 1970 British spy thriller film directed by Frank Pierson based on the 1965 novel by John le Carré The Looking Glass War.

== Plot ==
After an MI6 agent carrying a roll of film containing flyover photographs of the East German town of Kalkstadt is found dead and the film goes missing, MI6 conclude he was killed by the Stasi to cover up the presence of a new rocket system based on the V-2. The rocket was previously spotted in vague, on-the-ground photos, and if real, its existence would be a violation of international agreements. A source entices MI6 with another set of photographs that conclusively confirm the rocket's existence, and only after receiving payment does he reveal that the photographs are being held in Kalkstadt itself by his father. MI6 members John Avery, Haldane, and their superior LeClerc hatch a plan to retrieve the photographs and to verify the rocket by sending a lone operative over the East German border to Kalkstadt. Polish defector Leiser, who illegally entered England to be with a woman who is bearing his child, is vetted for the role by MI6 and offered UK citizenship if he agrees to work for them. Leiser accepts, to be with his child.

Leiser is quickly trained in self-defence and survival skills at an MI6 safehouse, and taught how to use a portable radio transmitter to send coded messages. Not long before the mission, however, he briefly escapes his handlers to meet with his girlfriend. When she tells him that she had their child aborted, Leiser is deeply distraught and loses the motivation to carry out the mission, but changes his mind after bonding with Avery over a night of drinking. Leiser crosses the border into East Germany under cover of night, while the MI6 agents monitor for his radio messages from a West German cabin. On the way in, Leiser cuts his hand badly on the barbed wire fence and is forced to kill a young East German border guard who sees him. In the morning, the dead border guard is discovered and becomes a major news story.

Leiser is picked up by a lorry driver, but kills the driver after he demands sexual favours for the lift. Leiser continues driving the lorry until he passes out from exhaustion, at which point a local girl and her young friend board and drive for him. When the lorry is stopped at a military checkpoint, the girl covers for Leiser but the soldiers still check his papers. The Stasi immediately notice inconsistencies in Leiser's circumstances and identify him as the person who breached the border and killed the guard but the soldiers are ordered to let him go so that his intentions can be determined. At a lake, the girl submerges the lorry and Leiser leaves the girl and her friend behind.

In Kalkstadt, Leiser finally reaches his destination but learns that the photographs never existed and MI6's source was a con artist. Despondent and feverish from his infected hand, Leiser attempts to leave town but is stopped by the Stasi, who tell him that the roads are closed and he must stay at a hotel. He reunites with the girl and is taken to her apartment, where she explains that she knows he is from the West and wants to leave the country with him. That night, the MI6 operation is ordered to be shut down since it caused an international incident; at the same time, Leiser witnesses the East German rocket being transported through Kalkstadt's streets. As Leiser frantically relays his observation over radio, the Stasi pick up his transmission and triangulate his location, then gun him and the girl down. At the West German cabin, Avery is disillusioned by LeClerc's revelation that Leiser had always been considered expendable; he was given an obsolete radio to make it seem he was working alone, and he was denied a pistol so the West could not be accused of an act of war. In the end, it is implied that the East German rocket was only an elaborate bluff intended to provoke the West. The roll of film lost by the dead MI6 agent is found by a group of children who open it up and destroy it while playing.

== Cast ==
- Christopher Jones as Leiser
- Pia Degermark as The Girl
- Ralph Richardson as LeClerc
- Paul Rogers as Haldane
- Anthony Hopkins as John Avery
- Susan George as The Girl in London
- Ray McAnally as Under Secretary of State
- Robert Urquhart as Johnson
- Anna Massey as Avery's Wife
- Vivian Pickles as Mrs. King
- Maxine Audley as Mrs. LeClerc
- Cyril Shaps as East German Detective
- Michael Robbins as Truck Driver
- Timothy West as Taylor
- Frederick Jaeger as The Pilot
- Peter Swanwick as Finnish Policeman
- Paul Maxwell as CIA Man
- Guy Deghy as Fritsche
- Ernest Walder as Radio Engineer
- Patrick Wright as East German Policeman (VoPo)
- Sylva Langova as East German Woman
- David Scheur as Russian Officer
- Allan McClelland as Doctor
- Angela Down as Chelsea Girl
- Robert Wilde as English Policeman
- Nicholas Stewart as German Boy
- Linda Hedger as Taylor's Child
- Russell Lewis as Avery's Child

== Production ==
The film was shot in the UK and “Europe” (Spain).

== See also ==
- List of British films of 1970
