= Nils Mesterton =

Swedish Army officer

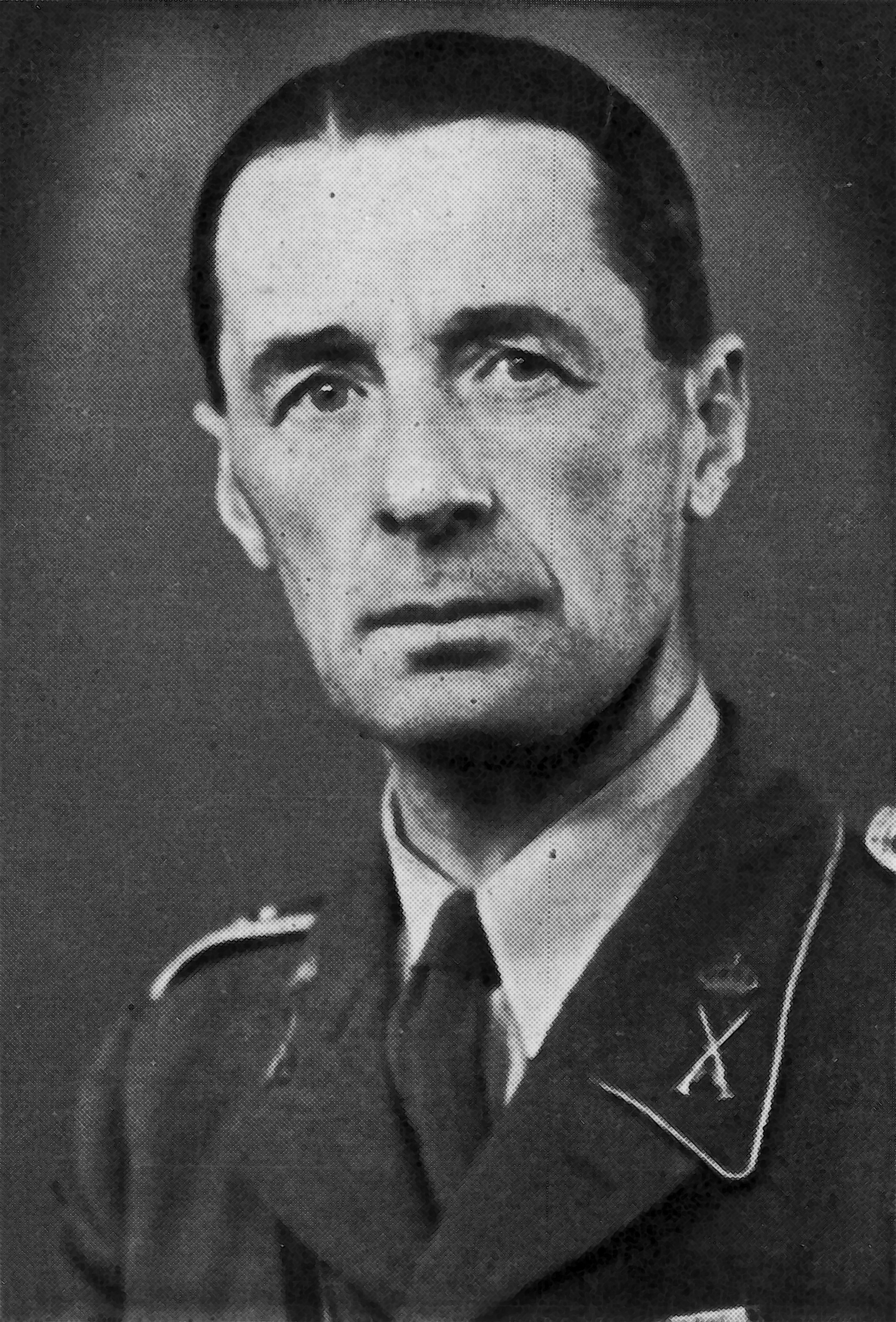
- Mesterton as captain.
- Born: Carl Fredrik Nils Mesterton; 16 September 1888; Stockholm, Sweden
- Died: 10 November 1962 (aged 74); Nora, Sweden
- Military career
- Allegiance: Sweden
- Branch: Swedish Army
- Rank: Lieutenant Colonel
- Unit: Västernorrland Regiment (I 21)
- Conflicts: Ådalen shootings (1931)

Carl Fredrik Nils Mesterton (16 September 1888 – 10 November 1962) was a Swedish Army officer who became known as the military commander on the scene at the Ådalen shootings in Sweden on 14 May 1931.

== Personal background ==
Nils Mesterton was born in Stockholm as the third son and fourth child of lieutenant Carl Daniel Mesterton and Ebba von Redlich, daughter of the German consul-general in Stockholm. His grandfather was the doctor Carl Benedict Mesterton. Mesterton's father died in 1889, and in 1899 his mother married the poet Oscar Levertin, who became Mesterton's stepfather.

Following his upper-secondary final examination, Mesterton was trained as a reserve officer in the Swedish Army. He also finished a government administration examination and studied economics at the university. Thereafter, he worked some time at a bank office. He later became an officer at the Västernorrland Regiment (I 21) in Sollefteå, Ångermanland.

== Ådalen shootings ==
On 14 May 1931 in Lunde, Västernorrland County, a demonstration was taking place between striking workers and strikebreakers when rioting broke out, and military troops from the Västernorrland Regiment were called in to maintain order. Captain Mesterton was the leader of the military unit. Protesters started to throw stones at the troops, and tried to enter the area where the strikebreakers were located. The troops opened fire, killing four protesters and a bystander.

== Aftermath ==
For his role in the shootings, Mesterton was tried by a court-martial in Sollefteå which sentenced him to eight days in custody without surveillance. Several of the protesters were tried in a civilian court and received harsh prison sentences.

After the Ådalen riots, Mesterton became the target of much of the protestors' anger. He was commonly referred to in the Swedish socialist press as the "murderer from Lunde". Mesterton himself is said to have taken the incident very hard and became a broken man.

In 1950, Mesterton became lieutenant colonel in Västernorrland Regiment's reserve.

== Personal life ==
In 1934 he married a widow. Mesterton died on 10 November 1962 in Nora, Sweden and was buried at Karlslund's Cemetery in Nora.

== Awards and decorations ==
- Knight of the Order of the Sword
