= Roland Hedlund =

Swedish actor (1933–2019)

- Born: Roland Napoleon Hedlund; 17 November 1933; Ersmark, Sweden
- Died: 8 March 2019 (aged 85); Skellefteå
- Occupation: Actor
- Years active: 1955-2012
- Spouse: Lisa Bergström (m. 1964–1978)

Roland Hedlund (17 November 1933 – 8 March 2019) was a Swedish actor. For his role in the 1969 film Ådalen 31 he won the Best Actor award at the 6th Guldbagge Awards. He appeared in more than 70 films and television shows between 1955 and 2012.

== Selected filmography ==
- Violence (1955)
- Ådalen 31 (1969)
- A Guy and a Gal (1975)
- Rasmus på luffen (1981)
- A Hill on the Dark Side of the Moon (1983)
- Codename Coq Rouge (1989)
- The Hunters (1996)
- Beck – Kartellen (2002)
