= Bo Widerberg =

Swedish film director, screenwriter, and film editor

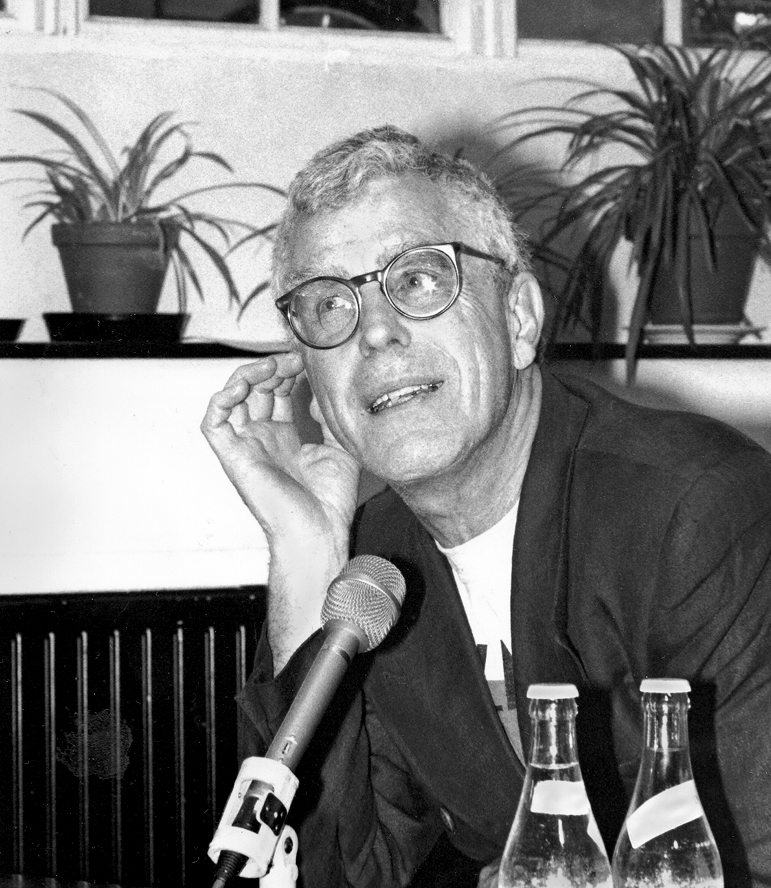
- Bo Widerberg in 1990.
- Born: Bo Gunnar Widerberg; 8 June 1930; Malmö, Sweden
- Died: 1 May 1997 (aged 66); Båstad, Sweden
- Occupations: Film director, screenwriter, editor, actor
- Years active: 1962–1995
- Spouse(s): Ann-Mari Björklund (m. 1953–1954) Vanja Nettelbladt (m. 1954–1973)
- Children: Nina, Martin, Johan, Matilda

Bo Gunnar Widerberg (Swedish: [ˈbuː ˈvîːdɛrbærj]; 8 June 1930 – 1 May 1997) was a Swedish film director, screenwriter, film editor, and actor.

== Early life and education ==
Bo Gunnar Widerberg was born on 8 June 1930 in Malmö,

== Career ==
Widerberg began his career as a writer. In 1952 he published his first novel, Hösttermin. In the same year, his short story collection Kyssas, published by Bonnier, became a bestseller. His most successful book was the novel Erotikon (1957). The novel's title comes from Mauritz Stiller's 1920 silent film classic Erotikon. Widerberg's last novel is Den gröna draken, which was published in 1959 and is a satire on the advertising industry. The book was made into a film by Widerberg himself, with the title Heja Roland! (1966).

In 1962, Widerberg's collection of essays titled The Vision in Swedish Film was published. He was critical of Swedish films, especially those by Ingmar Bergman, whom he called "Our spirit's Dala horse in the world", and likened his films to "... an export item filled with undisguised exoticism". This led Gustav Scheutz to offer him a filmmaking opportunity at Europafilm. Widerberg made his feature film debut with The Baby Carriage (1963) with colleague Jan Troell as photographer, and in the same year came Raven's End (1963), both with Thommy Berggren in the lead role. He then made several films starring Berggren, including the American film Joe Hill (1971).

Widerberg's 1967 film Elvira Madigan received great international attention, and the lead actress Pia Degermark was awarded Best Actress at the Cannes Film Festival that year. Ådalen 31 (1969), about the Ådalen shootings in 1931 when five demonstrators were shot dead by the military, also received critical acclaim. The film won the Special Grand Prize of the Jury at the 1969 Cannes Film Festival and was nominated for both the Academy Award for Best Foreign Language Film and the Golden Globe Award for Best Foreign Language Film. It won the prestigious Grand Prix of the Belgian Film Critics Association and received multiple awards in the 6th Guldbagge Awards.

The Man on the Roof (1976) is pioneering Swedish crime film, known among other things for a comically stilted police dialogue and a helicopter crash in central Stockholm. It is based on the 1971 novel The Abominable Man by Maj Sjöwall and Per Wahlöö. The film won two Guldbagge Awards in 1977, for Best Film and Best Actor (Håkan Serner). In 1984 came another crime film directed by Widerberg, The Man from Majorca (1984), this time based on the novel The Pig Party by Leif G. W. Persson.

His last feature, All Things Fair (1995), about a teacher's forbidden love affair with a student, played by his son Johan Widerberg, was awarded the Special Jury Prize Silver Bear and the Blue Angel Award at the 46th Berlin International Film Festival, the Audience Award at Gothenburg Film Festival, and three Guldbagge Awards. The film was also nominated for an Academy Award for Best Foreign Language Film.

Widerberg has also directed theatre, including at Dramaten and Malmö Stadsteater, in addition to TV theater for SVT.

In 1996, he founded the Lilla Film Festival at Bio Scala in Båstad. In memory of the founder, the festival has been awarding the Bo Widerberg scholarship since 1997 to filmmakers who work in Widerberg's spirit.

== Awards ==
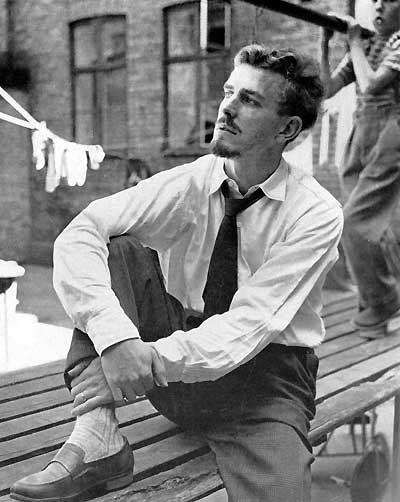
Bo Widerberg c. 1960

Widerberg won a Silver Bear at the 46th Berlin International Film Festival for All Things Fair and a Special Grand Jury Prize at the Cannes Festival for Ådalen 31. Raven's End, Ådalen 31, and All Things Fair all received a nominations for the Academy Award for Best Foreign Language Film. For Ådalen 31 Widerberg won the Guldbagge Award for Best Director at the 6th Guldbagge Awards. For The Man on the Roof he won the award for Best Film at the 13th Guldbagge Awards.

== Personal life ==
Widerberg married Ann-Mari Björklund in 1953; they divorced in 1954. His second wife was Vanja Nettelbladt (1954 to 1973).

He had four children: Nina, Martin, Johan, and Matilda. As a child, Nina acted in five of her father's films, including Barnvagnen and The Man on the Roof. Johan played Detective Kollberg's son in The Man on the Roof. Johan later became an actor and Martin became a director.

Widerberg suffered from bipolar disorder, especially in his later years, so worked at a very uneven pace. He was also known as a difficult person to work for at times, demanding adherence to his standards.

== Death and legacy ==
Widerberg died in Ängelholm, Sweden, on 1 May 1997 of stomach cancer, and was buried in the New Cemetery in Båstad.

His work has influenced not only on other Scandinavian filmmakers, such as Roy Andersson (who worked with him), Ruben Östlund, and Lars Von Trier (who regards Joe Hill as one of the top five films ever made), but also more widely, including directors Olivier Assayas, Robert Guédiguian, and Michael Haneke.

In conjunction with the City Tunnel in Malmö, a small plaza around the southern entrance to the train, named Bo Widerberg Place, was inaugurated in 2010. The site is located near Widerberg's former residence in the city.

=== Being Bo Widerberg ===
The 2025 biographical documentary film Being Bo Widerberg (I huvudet på Bo) was written and co-directed by Jon Asp, and co-directed by Mattias Nohrborg. The film highlights the rivalry between Widerberg and Ingmar Bergman. It spans Widerberg's life from his early days as an author and film critic through to his highly successful career. It includes interviews with the director from the archives, as well as insights into his sometimes chaotic personal life by interviewing family, colleagues, and friends.

The film was screened in the "Documentaries about Cinema" section at the 2025 Cannes Film Festival, and was nominated for the Guldbagge Award for Best Documentary Feature at the 61st Guldbagge Awards in 2026. It was distributed to Sweden, Denmark, Finland, the Netherlands, and France, and also screened at the Film Forum cinema in New York, and as part of the Hurtigruten Nordic Film Festival 2026 in Australia.

== Filmography ==
Widerberg directed the following films:

- The Boy and the Kite (1962) (30 min short film, photography by Jan Troell)
- The Baby Carriage (1963)
- Raven's End (1963)
- Love 65 (1965)
- Heja Roland! (1966)
- Elvira Madigan (1967)
- The White Game (1968)
- Ådalen 31 (1969)
- A Mother with Two Children Expecting Her Third (1970) (7 min short film, interview with Vanessa Redgrave)
- Joe Hill (1971)
- Stubby (1974)
- The Man on the Roof (1976)
- En handelsresandes död (1979) (TV film)
- Måsen (1979) (TV film)
- Victoria (1979)
- Missförståndet (1981) (TV film)
- Linje Lusta (1981) (TV film)
- Rött och svart (1982) (unfinished)
- The Man from Majorca (1984)
- Ormens väg på hälleberget (The Serpent's Way, 1986)
- En far (1988) (TV film)
- Vildanden (The Wild Duck, 1989) (TV film)
- Hebriana (1990) (TV film)
- Efter föreställningen (1992) (TV film)
- Tagning Alla är äldre än jag ... (1994) (unfinished)
- All Things Fair (1995)
