= Kerstin Tidelius =

Swedish actress (1934–2023)

Kerstin Martha Tidelius (14 October 1934 – 15 February 2023) was a Swedish actress.

She was born on 14 October 1934 in Stockholm, Sweden. She worked mainly on stage with a total of about 20 film and TV appearances. Her most notable performances were Ingrid Löfgren in the long running Swedish TV series Hem till byn and a supporting role as Henrietta Vergérus, the bishop's sister, in Fanny and Alexander by Ingmar Bergman.

She was a part of the Gothenburg City Theatre's permanent ensemble for almost 40 years.

Tidelius was awarded the Svenska Dagbladet Thaliapriset (the Thalia Acting Award) in 1966.

Tidelius died on 15 February 2023, at the age of 88.

== Filmography ==
Year	Title	Role	Notes
1953	Marianne	Girl at club	
1955	Kärlek på turné	Waitress in Lesjöfors	Uncredited
1966	Adamsson i Sverige	Tilde	
1967	Roseanna	Sonja Hansson	
1968	Who Saw Him Die?	Gunvor Mårtensson	
1969	Ådalen 31	Karin, hans mor	
1981	Snacka går ju...	Holgeus	
1982	Avskedet	Maria von Freyer	
1982	Fanny and Alexander	Henrietta Vergerus - Biskopsgården	
1984	Polisen som vägrade ge upp	Birgit Spjut	1 episode
1996	Juloratoriet	Head Nurse	
2000	En rikedom bortom allt förstånd	Ellika Karlberg	Short
