= Nahid Persson Sarvestani =

Swedish-Iranian documentary filmmaker

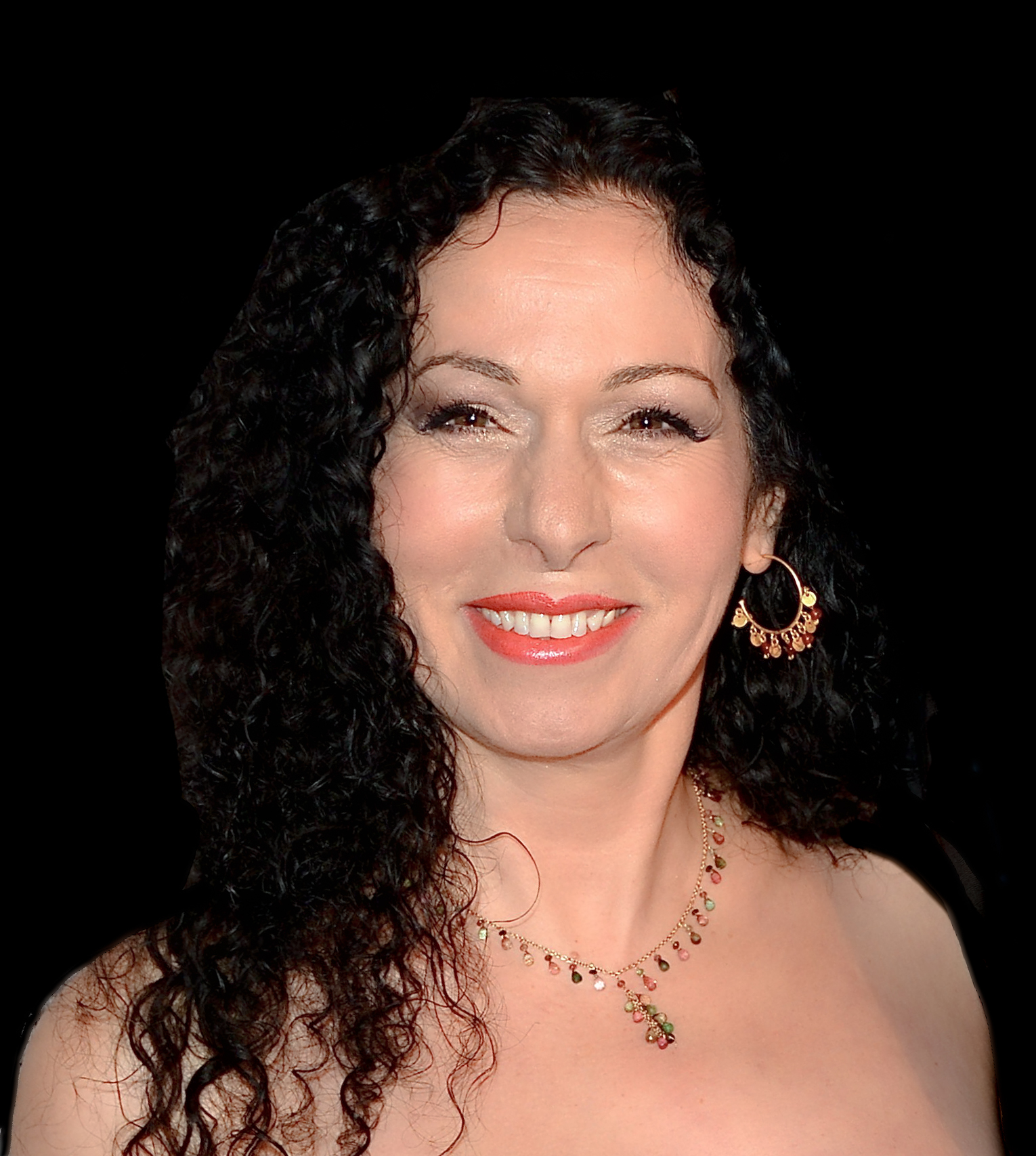
- Sarvestani in 2013
- Born: Nahid Sarvestani; 24 May 1960 (age 66); Shiraz, Imperial State of Iran
- Occupation: Documentary film director
- Years active: 1994–present

Nahid Persson Sarvestani (born 24 May 1960) is a Swedish-Iranian documentary filmmaker.

Her most famous documentary films are Prostitution Behind the Veil, My Mother – A Persian Princess, The End of Exile, and The Last Days of Life. In 2007, after being arrested and briefly imprisoned by the authorities in Iran for allegedly shaming her native country with her documentary on two prostitutes in Tehran, she completed the documentary Four Wives - One Man under dangerous conditions. The film portrays a polygamous family south of Shiraz smuggled out of Iran and finally edited in Sweden. As of November 2008, Persson Sarvestani finished the production of The Queen and I, a 90-minute documentary in which the director's year-long, complex relationship with the former Iranian Empress Farah Pahlavi is examined. The film had its North American premiere at Sundance Film Festival in 2009 and was under worldwide release in conjunction with the 30th anniversary of the Islamic Revolution in 2009.

Persson Sarvestani has received several awards for her films. The Last Days of Life received the Swedish Cancer Foundation's (Cancerfondens) Journalist Prize in 2002. The film Prostitution Behind The Veil, a controversial and painfully revealing account of the lives of two prostitutes in Tehran, received an International Emmy nomination, as well as the Golden Dragon at the Kraków Film Festival, Best International News Documentary at the TV-festival 2005 in Monte Carlo, as well as The Crystal Award (Kristallen) by SVT (Swedish public broadcasting television) and the Golden Scarab (Guldbaggen) by the Swedish Film Institute in 2005.

Persson Sarvestani also shares TCO's (Tjänstemännens Centralorganisation) 2005 Cultural Prize with the author Marjaneh Bakhtiari.
