= The White Game =

Den vita sporten
- Film poster
- Directed by: Roy Andersson; Kalle Boman; Lena Ewert; Staffan Hedqvist; Axel R.-Lohmann; Lennart Malmer; Jörgen Persson; Ingela Romare; Inge Roos; Rudi Spee; Bo Widerberg
- Distributed by: AB Svensk Filmindustri; Swedish Film Institute (after 1994)
- Release date: 9 September 1968
- Running time: 102 minutes
- Country: Sweden
- Language: Swedish

The White Game (Swedish: Den vita sporten) is a 1968 Swedish documentary film about the protests against the 1968 Davis Cup tennis match between Sweden and Rhodesia, in Båstad, Sweden.

== Synopsis ==
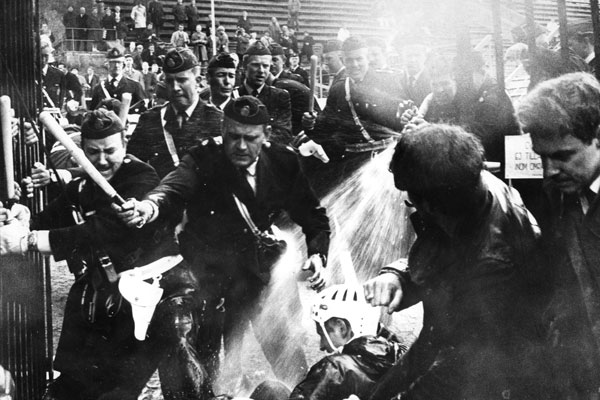

In a series of interviews, demonstrators and members of the Swedish government give their views on sport, politics and civil disobedience.

The politically aware students see the protest as an expression of a will to change society. The Minister of Education, Olof Palme, expresses the opinion that some talented tennis players seem to be as bad at politics as he is at tennis. The Minister for Justice, Herman Kling, refuses to comment on the actions of the Swedish Tennis Association, while the Minister of the Interior, Rune Johansson, says that the Association is aware of the governments position, although no official actions have been taken to prevent the match.

Between the interviews, footage of the oppression of black people in Africa is interpolated. A white Rhodesian man says that the blacks should be happy that whites rule the country and keep things in order; he then calls on his black chef who agrees with him. Black university students in Sweden express their disappointment over the Swedish government's lack of action. The captain of the Rhodesian team, Adrian Bay, is interviewed; he avoids commenting on politics.

== Background ==
The documentary was filmed during the demonstration against the Davis Cup match between Sweden and Rhodesia. The match were to take place in Båstad, May 3–5, 1968. Rhodesia was at this time boycotted by several nations, on the recommendation of the United Nations, because of the oppression by Ian Smith's white government of the country's black population. The demonstrators, who demanded that the match should be stopped, represented among others the Swedish Social Democratic Youth League, the Centre Party Youth and Liberal Youth of Sweden, as well as representatives of the Church of Sweden, students and political organisation such as Clarté and the Swedish arm of the National Front for the Liberation of Southern Vietnam. After a clash between the demonstrators and police, the match was cancelled. It was later played at a private tennis club in France.

== Production ==
A couple of days before the demonstration, the Swedish Film Institute agree to finance the documentary. Nine hours of footage was captured, using five 16 mm film cameras.

Disagreement over post-production of the extensive material led to conflicts that were debated and commented on in the media. The Minister of Justice Herman Kling, demanded to see the material, claiming that he had been promised the right to do so by Bo Widerberg. However, the filmmakers refused, referring to the demonstrators legal rights.

Further conflicts ensued, between the filmmakers and the Film Institute over producer rights, the evaluation of the collective work effort, and the lengthy post-production. In July the filmmakers formally formed the film collective and production company Grupp 13. Members of the collective were Roy Andersson, Kalle Boman, Lena Ewert, Sven Fahlén, Staffan Hedqvist, Axel Rudorf-Lohmann, Lennart Malmer, Björn Öberg, Jörgen Persson, Ingela Romare, Inge Roos, Rudi Spee and Bo Widerberg. They agreed to finance 40 per cent of the film and AB Svensk Filmindustri stepped in to finance 30 per cent.

== Critical reception ==
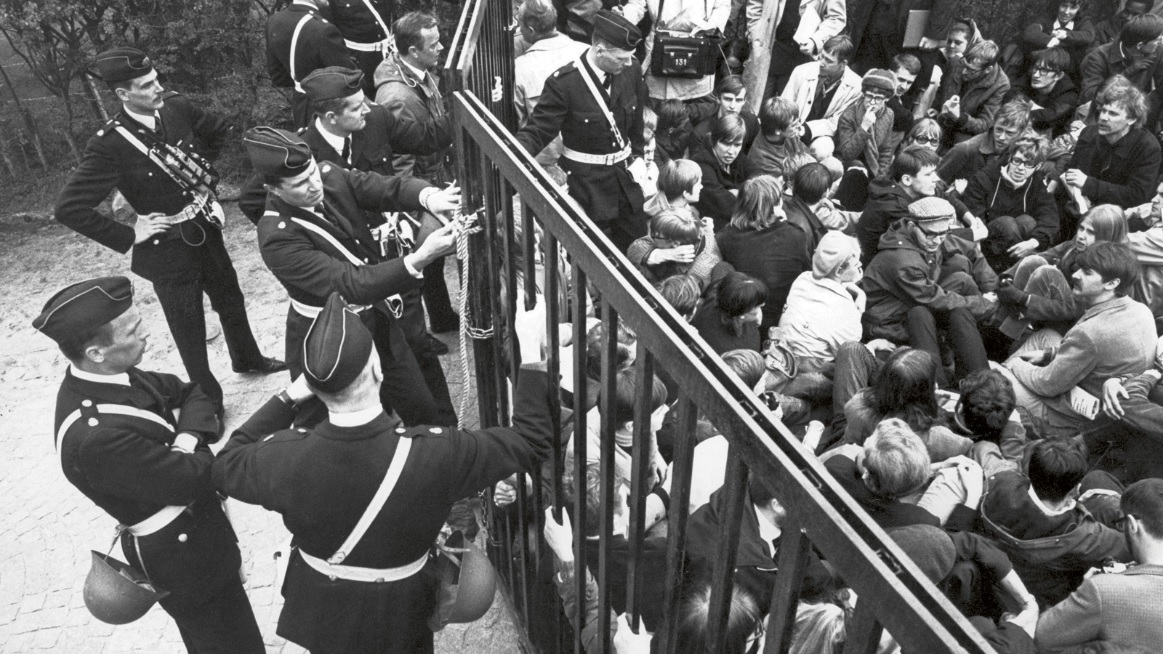

When Grupp 13's documentary premiered in Stockholm, four months after the protest and riots, it was met by the critics with almost universal acclaim. Under the headline "The Båstad Film – A Superb Reportage", Jurgen Schildt wrote in Aftonbladet "The White Game arrives post festum in the Båstad-debate, but that is about the only critical thing that can be said about it." He commented favourably on the depth of analysis, smooth editing, and the mixture of pathos and logos in the polemic.

In Expressen, Lasse Bergström, called it "one of the most important political films ever made in Sweden". He further wrote "The White Game expresses in images what Olof Palme have been saying in words: 'politics is will'." And it demonstrates clearly that the protests was a victory for the young generation [...] and a defeat for the sports-movement, which, regrettably, no longer shares their ideals. " Bergström meant that most importantly, The White Game showed a young, politically aware, generation, which saw Sweden as a force of good in the world and — if worst came to worst — were prepared to fight for their belief. Lennart Jönsson, wrote in Dagens Nyheter that The White Game gave the first complete view of the protests. Through the film, one received a clear view of the difference between the demonstrators and those that were for the game. "Grupp 13's film shows clearly, that the demonstrators are relatively knowledgeable people, aware of social and political problems, and also aware that these problems cannot be solved — entirely — by parliamentary means. Against them stands a group — with comparatively weak arguments, unclear ideas of law and order, and a weak interest for important international issues — backed by a strong police power. This is indeed a serious conflict of interests."

Film critic Hanserik Hjertén, complained in Svenska Dagbladet that the filmmakers showed some bias, posing a few overly rhetorical questions. However, Hjertén's overall impression of the film was positive, and he wrote that "a piece of modern Swedish history of significant value is brought into the limelight". After underlining the film's dramatic structure and the conflicts of not only moral importance that it illuminated, Hjertén wrote "The film shows an interesting polarity in Sweden: between intellectuals and non-intellectuals, and between sense of duty and private opinion. It is overall an impressive work, and an important contribution to future debate."

Together with another documentary about Båstad, called The Truth About Båstad (Swedish: Sannigen om Båstad) by Lars Westman, The White Game was awarded the 1968 Chaplin Magazine Award. In 1969 it the award for Best Film at the 6th Guldbagge Awards. The award money, approximately 350,000 SEK, more than covered the production costs of the film, which was a box office failure.
