= Kalle Boman =

Swedish film producer (born 1943)

- Born: 5 April 1943 (age 82)
- Occupation: Film producer
- Awards: Guldbagge Honorary Award

Karl-Axel "Kalle" Boman (born 5 April 1943) is a Swedish film producer based in Gothenburg who has been involved in many works in Swedish cinema for over 50 years.

Raised in Södermalm, he was exposed to a theatre school as a boy through a friend, and had a small role in Ingmar Bergman's 1949 film Prison. As a producer, Boman established his studio in Stockholm, but seeking more space, relocated it to Norrsundet.

In 2014, he received the Guldbagge Honorary Award. That year, with director Ruben Östlund, Boman entered an art installation into the Vandalorum Museum in Värnamo, with the artists' statement "The Square is a sanctuary of trust and caring. Within it we all share equal rights and obligations." This inspired Östlund's 2017 Palme d'Or-winning film The Square.

== Filmography ==
His films include:

- The White Game (1968)
- A Swedish Love Story (1970)
- Giliap (1975)
- You, the Living (2007)
- Eat Sleep Die (2012)
- Force Majeure (2014)
- A Pigeon Sat on a Branch Reflecting on Existence (2014)
