= 6th Guldbagge Awards =

Annual Swedish film awards ceremony

- Date: 13 October 1969
- Site: Spegeln & Operaterrassen, Stockholm, Sweden

Highlights
- Best Picture: The White Game

The 6th Guldbagge Awards ceremony, presented by the Swedish Film Institute, honored the best Swedish films of 1968 and 1969, and took place on 13 October 1969. The White Game directed by Grupp 13 was presented with the award for Best Film.

== Awards ==
- Best Film: The White Game by Grupp 13
- Best Director: Bo Widerberg for Ådalen 31
- Best Actor: Roland Hedlund for Ådalen 31
- Best Actress: Liv Ullmann for Shame
- Special Achievement: Rune Waldekranz
