= Pia Degermark =

Swedish actress (born 1949)

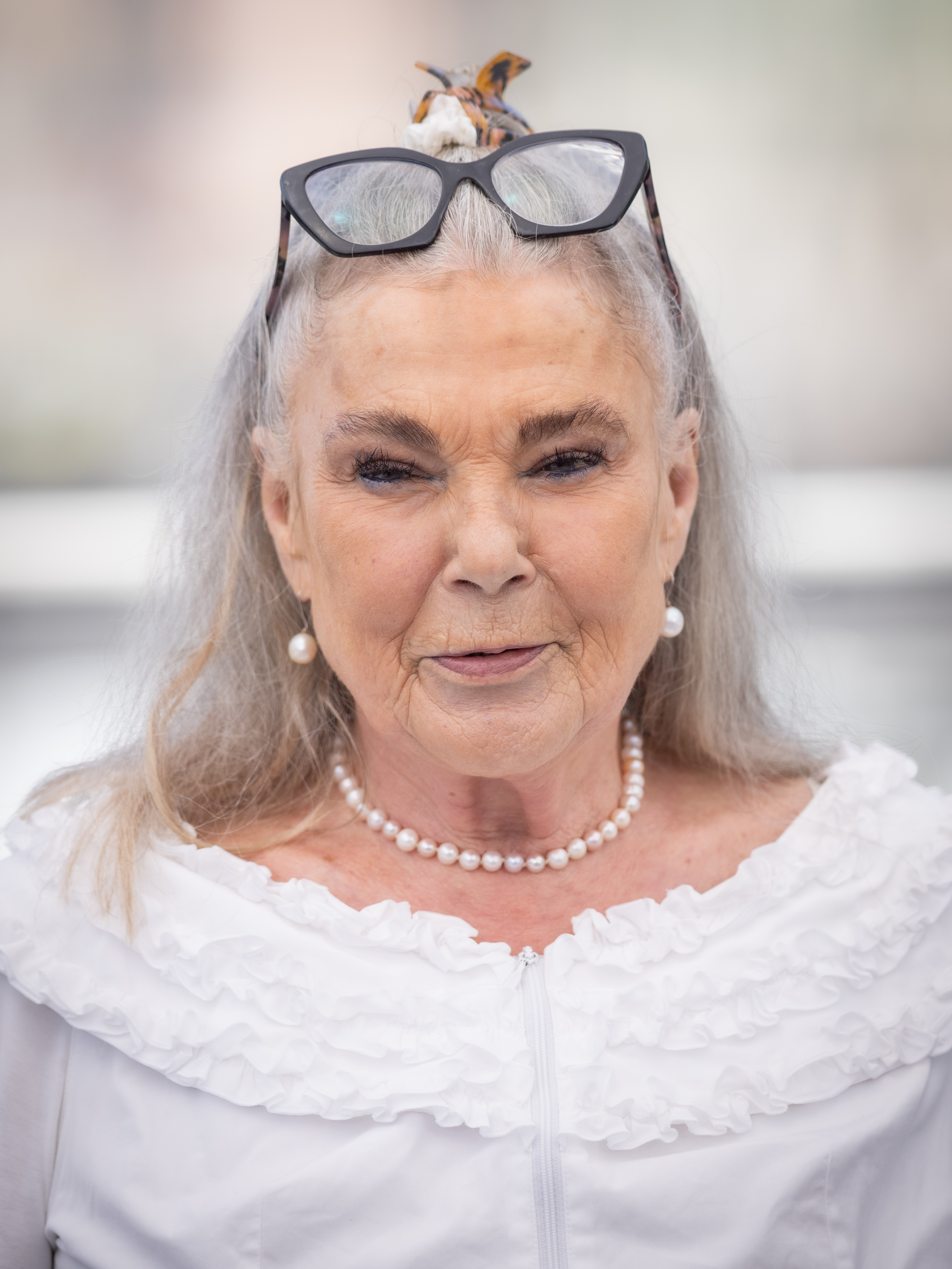
Pia Degermark in 2025.

Pia Charlotte Degermark (born 24 August 1949) is a Swedish actress. She is best known for her role as Elvira Madigan in the 1967 drama film Elvira Madigan, for which she won a Cannes Film Festival Award for Best Actress.

== Career ==
Born Pia Charlotte Degermark, she came to international notice as the lead in Elvira Madigan (1967), directed by Bo Widerberg, for which she won the Best Actress Award at the Cannes Film Festival in 1967. She was spotted by Widerberg in a newspaper photograph dancing with the Swedish Crown Prince Carl Gustav. Degermark acted in a few more films including The Looking Glass War (1970), an adaptation of John le Carré's novel of the same name, and The Vampire Happening (1971), a West German film produced by her husband.

== Personal life ==
Degermark described her father as an alcoholic but her early life as sheltered though being brought up in an affluent rural family. She suffered the symptoms of anorexia for some years before she married Siemens heir and film producer Pier Andrea Caminneci (1941–2013) in 1971; the couple had a son, divorcing in 1973. Degermark moved to the United States for a time. After returning to Sweden in 1979, still with anorexia, Degermark became involved in a relationship with a man that led to her moving in the drug subculture, and eventually being befriended by a female career criminal. She worked in women's voluntary groups for other people with anorexia. While in her 50s, she was embroiled in a series of disputes over missing money with both charity regulators and her father's second wife. After complaints were made by her stepmother to the authorities, Degermark served a prison sentence and lost the last friends remaining from her high water mark of teenage film star many years before.

== Filmography ==
Film
| Year | Title | Role | Notes |
|---|---|---|---|
| 1967 | Elvira Madigan | Elvira Madigan | |
| 1969 | A Brief Season (Una breve stagione) | Luisa | |
| 1970 | The Looking Glass War | The Girl | |
| 1971 | The Vampire Happening (Gebissen wird nur nachts) | Betty Williams / Clarimonde | |

== Awards and nominations ==
| Year | Festival/Awards | Category | Nominated work | Result |
|---|---|---|---|---|
| 1967 | 20th Cannes Film Festival | Best Actress | Elvira Madigan | Won |
| 1968 | 26th Golden Globe Awards | Most Promising Newcomer – Female | Elvira Madigan | Nominated |
| 1969 | 22nd British Academy Film Awards | Most Promising Newcomer to Leading Film Roles | Elvira Madigan | Nominated |
