= Sabaya (film) =

- Directed by: Hogir Hirori
- Produced by: Antonio Russio Merenda; Hogir Hirori
- Cinematography: Hogir Hirori
- Edited by: Hogir Hirori
- Music by: Mohammed Zaki
- Production companies: Lolav Media; Ginestra Film; Swedish Film Institute; SVT; Nordisk Film & TV Fund; YLE; VGTV; FilmStockholm/FilmBasen; Dogwoof
- Distributed by: Folkets Bio
- Release date: 30 January 2021 (Sundance)
- Running time: 91 minutes
- Country: Sweden
- Languages: Kurdish, Arabic
- Box office: $14,280

Sabaya is a 2021 Swedish documentary film, directed, shot and edited by Hogir Hirori. It follows a group who risk their lives to save sex slaves held captive by ISIS in Al-Hawl, Syria.

It had its world premiere at the Sundance Film Festival on 30 January 2021.

== Synopsis ==
The film follows a group into Syria's Al-Hawl, the most dangerous camp in the Middle East, as they risk their lives to save women being held by ISIS as abducted sex slaves.

== Release ==
The film had its world premiere at the Sundance Film Festival on 30 January 2021. Shortly after, MTV Documentary Films acquired U.S. distribution rights to the film. It also screened at CPH:DOX on 22 April 2021. The film has been awarded the Best Documentary Feature Film for the 14th edition of the Asian Pacific Screen Awards in 2021. It is scheduled to be released in the United States on 30 July 2021.

== Reception ==
Sabaya received positive reviews from film critics. It holds a 100% approval rating on review aggregator website Rotten Tomatoes, based on 41 reviews, with a weighted average of 8.70/10. The website's critical consensus reads, "Sabaya presents a scary and sobering look at human suffering -- and the efforts of those dedicated to ending it." On Metacritic, the film holds a rating of 86 out of 100, based on 15 critics, indicating "universal acclaim".

On May 24, 2022 Swedish online magazine Kvartal published an investigation accusing the documentary of having faked scenes and manipulated characters.
