= Hogir Hirori =

Kurdish-Swedish film director

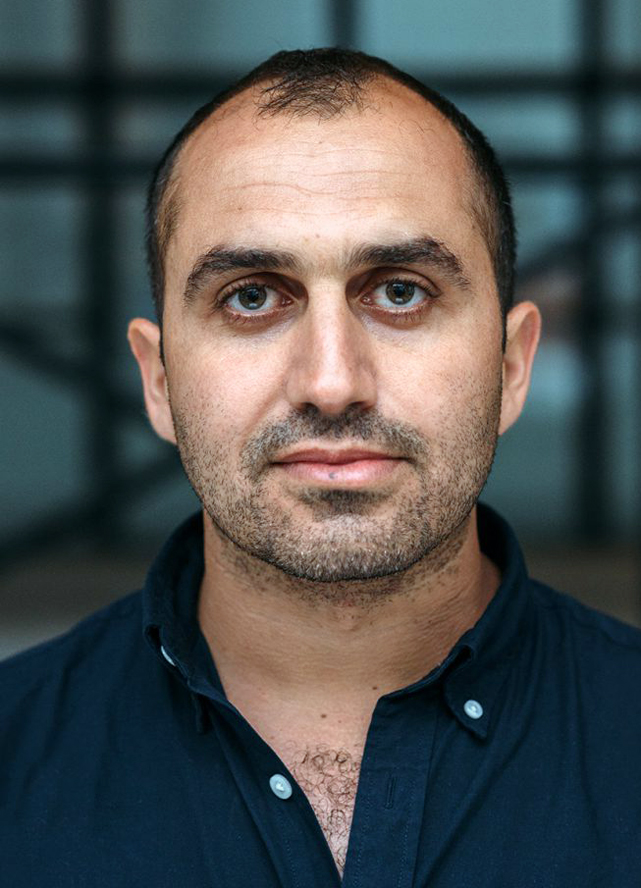
- Hogir Hirori 2020.
- Born: May 7, 1980 (age 45); Duhok, Kurdistan Region, Iraq
- Notable work: The Deminer, Sabaya
- Awards: Guldbagge Awards 2021, Sundance Film Festival 2021.

Hogir Hirori (born May 7, 1980, in Duhok, Kurdistan Region, Iraq) is a Kurdish-Swedish film director, known for his award-winning documentaries, The Deminer 2017, about a Kurdish disarmer, and Sabaya 2021, about the liberation of enslaved Yazidi women from the terrorist sect IS.

The film Sabaya won the Guldbagge Awards 2021, and the director's award 2021 at Sundance Film Festival. It has been criticized for not being strictly documentary, scenes are arranged with women who did not want to be in the film.

== Filmography ==
- Sabaya (2021)
- The Deminer (2017)
- The girl who saved my life (2016)
- Victims of IS (2014)
- Hewa strongest in Sweden (2007)
