= The Queen and I (2008 film) =

2008 Swedish-made documentary about Farah Pahlavi

- Cinema poster
- Directed by: Nahid Persson Sarvestani
- Written by: Nahid Persson Sarvestani; Zinat S. Lloyd
- Produced by: Nahid Persson Sarvestani
- Cinematography: Niklas Karpaty
- Edited by: Zinat S. Lloyd; Nahid Persson Sarvestani
- Production company: RealReel Doc
- Release dates: 20 November 2008 (Amsterdam International Documentary Film Festival); 13 February 2009 (Sweden)
- Running time: 89 minutes
- Countries: Sweden; Iran
- Languages: Swedish; Persian; English; French

The Queen and I (Swedish: Drottningen och jag) is a 2008 Swedish-made documentary feature film about Farah Pahlavi, the former Queen and Empress of Iran. The film was produced and directed by Iranian-Swedish filmmaker Nahid Persson Sarvestani. The film follows the former queen and empress and the director, a former communist, as they share ideas and concerns about the country they were both forced to leave after the revolution.

== Storyline ==
The film opens by showing the coronation of Farah Pahlavi and Mohammad Reza Pahlavi in 1967 and explaining the story of Nahid's childhood, growing up in a poor family where lunch was not a mundane privilege. She explains the downfall of the shah, the rising popularity of Khomeini, and the death of her brother, Rostam, along with how she escaped to Dubai from Iran, remaining as a fugitive there for two years before flying to Sweden on a fake passport.

After several emails to the former empress, Nahid is invited to her home in Paris. Two weeks into the filming, however, Farah's secretary Kambiz Atabay discovers Nahid's previous involvement in anti-Shah organizations, and Farah refuses to continue. Six months later, Nahid sends Farah a trailer she's made from the footage so far, and when Farah realises that Nahid isn't out to slander her, she invites Nahid back to continue with the documentary. Together, they visit different places and talk about various subjects. They go to a café in Paris, where Farah is stopped by Iranian people who recognise her; they travel to Cairo, Egypt where Farah first came during her exile and where the shah is buried; and to Washington D.C. area in royalist parties, still recognising the former empress as their queen and her son, Reza Pahlavi, as the present Shah. They also attend a gala for the Iranian Children's Foundation. By the end of the film an unlikely friendship has formed between the exiled queen and her former adversary.

== Production and release ==
The film, produced in association with SVT and NHK, and with financial backing from the Swedish Film Institute and the EU MEDIA programme, was shot during several meetings between Nahid and Farah over a period of two years. It was first shown at the International Documentary Film Festival Amsterdam in November 2008, and then at the Sundance Film Festival in January 2009, where it was nominated for the Grand Jury Prize. It was released on cinema in Sweden on 13 February 2009, and after touring more film festivals, it also saw a theatrical release in France on 23 December 2009.

In the United States, the film never saw a theatrical release, but went directly to TV. HBO showed it for the US audience on 17 June 2012.

In various interviews after the film was released, Farah Pahlavi has expressed that she likes the film herself, and she was invited to Sweden by Nahid Persson Sarvestani to see the first rough-cut version that was two hours long.
