= Ådalen =

Valley in Sweden

Coordinates: 63°0′N 17°45′E

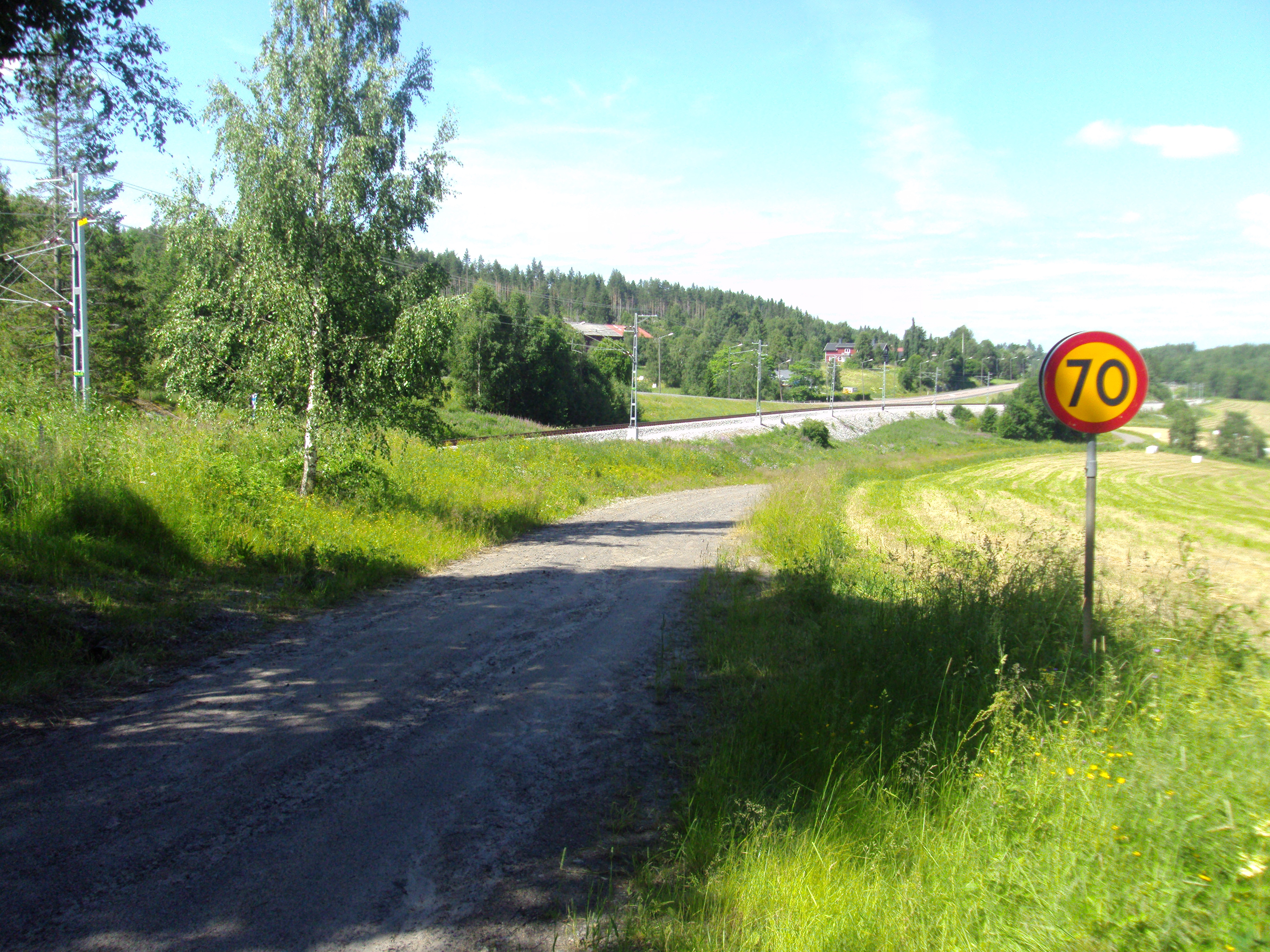
Strömnäs, circa one Scandinavian mile southeast of Kramfors.

Ådalen (Swedish: [ˈoːˌdɑlən]) is the river valley of the Ångerman River, downstream Junsele, in Sweden. It often refers to the broad, densely populated, fjord-like mouth of the river, in Kramfors Municipality, and is known for the May 1931 Ådalen shootings.

== See also ==
- Sandö Bridge
