= Ski Fever =

- Directed by: Curt Siodmak
- Written by: Curt Siodmak; Robert L. Joseph
- Produced by: Wolfgang Schmidt; Mark Cooper
- Starring: Martin Milner
- Cinematography: Jan Stallich
- Music by: Jerry Styner; Guy Hemric
- Production companies: Gaumont International; Hollywood; Parnass
- Distributed by: Allied Artists (USA)
- Release dates: 1966 (Europe); 1968 (U.S.)
- Running time: 97 mins
- Countries: United States; West Germany; Austria; Czechoslovakia
- Language: English

Ski Fever (Liebesspiele im Schnee) is a 1966 German-American musical film directed by Curt Siodmak. It is sometimes considered as the last of the beach party cycle. The film was shot in Europe. The movie was the last theatrical feature Siodmak directed.

Siodmak later discussed the film:

[It] was about girls in ski resorts who have lost all morals and about some ski instructors who fool around with them. Anyhow, when I came back from working on it, the sex wave had started in America. You could see all those naked dames and couples in bed, of which I could only talk, but never show. The picture was outdated the day it was released. The permissiveness of the audience had turned 180 degrees.

== Plot ==
At an Austrian ski resort, various instructors have a competition who can seduce the most women. Matters are complicated by the arrival of an American ski instructor, Brian, and an American girl, Susan.

== Cast ==
- Claudia Martin as Susan Halsey
- Martin Milner as Brian Davis
- Toni Sailer as Franz Gruber
- Vivi Bach as Karen Sloan
- Dietmar Schönherr as Toni Brandt
- Kurt Großkurth as Max

== Reception ==
Variety wrote "On the assumption that the people who go to see Ski Fever will pay the kind of intermittent attention to the film that is usually associated only with tv, pic may play off by boring only a minimal number of people. Expecting stronger response seems beyond the ability of this carelessly made attempt to reach the teen market."

Filmink wrote "There’s some flirting, songs (sung in a German accent), a lot of skiing."

The Jerry Styner/Guy Hemric composition, "Please Don't Gamble with Love" was nominated for the Golden Globe Award for Best Original Song.
