= Jörgen Persson (cinematographer) =

Swedish cinematographer (born 1936)

- Born: 10 September 1936 (age 89); Helsingborg, Sweden
- Occupation: Cinematographer
- Years active: 1965-present

Jörgen Persson (born 10 September 1936) is a Swedish cinematographer. He has worked on 60 films since 1965. At the 22nd Guldbagge Awards he won the Special Achievement award. At the 28th Guldbagge Awards he was nominated for the Best Cinematography award for the film The Best Intentions.

== Selected filmography ==
- Elvira Madigan (1967)
- The White Game (1968)
- A Swedish Love Story (1970)
- The Simple-Minded Murderer (1982)
- The Inside Man (1984)
- False as Water (1985)
- Pelle the Conqueror (1987)
- Peter och Petra (1989)
- The Best Intentions (1992)
