= Edward Lachman =

American cinematographer and director (born 1948)

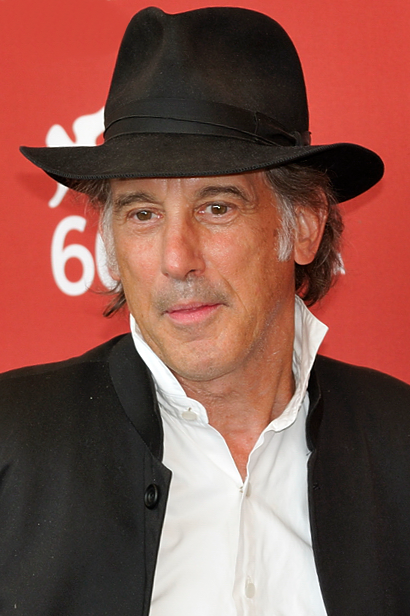
- Lachman in 2009
- Born: March 31, 1948 (age 78); Morristown, New Jersey, U.S.
- Other name: Ed Lachman
- Education: Harvard University; University of Tours; Ohio University
- Occupations: Cinematographer; director
- Years active: 1972–present
- Children: 1

Edward Lachman (born March 31, 1948) is an American cinematographer and director, known primarily for his work in independent films.

Lachman has received four Academy Award for Best Cinematography nominations for his work on Far from Heaven (2002), Carol (2015), El Conde (2023), and Maria (2024). His other work includes La Soufrière (1977), Desperately Seeking Susan (1985), Mississippi Masala (1991), The Virgin Suicides (1999), Erin Brockovich (2000), A Prairie Home Companion (2006), and Life During Wartime (2009).

For his work on television, he was nominated for the Primetime Emmy Award for Outstanding Cinematography for a Limited Series or Movie for the HBO miniseries Mildred Pierce (2011). He is a member of the American Society of Cinematographers.

== Early life ==
Lachman was born to a Jewish family in Morristown, New Jersey, the son of Rosabel (Roth) and Edward Lachman, a movie theater distributor and owner. He attended Harvard University and studied in France at the University of Tours before pursuing a BFA in painting at Ohio University. He has a daughter, Bella Lachman (b. 2005) who is born and raised in Amsterdam and currently lives in Paris.

== Career ==
In 1989, Lachman co-directed a segment of the anthology film Imagining America. In 2002, he co-directed the controversial Ken Park with Larry Clark. In 2013, Lachman produced a series of videos in collaboration with French electronic duo Daft Punk, for their album Random Access Memories.

== Filmography ==
=== Cinematographer ===
==== Film ====
Year	Title	Director	Notes
1974	The Lords of Flatbush	Martin Davidson; Stephen Verona	With Joseph Mangine
1977	False Face	John Grissmer	
1980	Union City	Marcus Reichert	
1982	Little Wars	Maroun Bagdadi	With Heinz Hölscher
1985	Desperately Seeking Susan	Susan Seidelman	
1985	The Little Sister	Jan Egleson	
1985	Heart of the Garden	Lavinia Currier	
1986	Portfolio	Robert Guralnick	
1986	True Stories	David Byrne	
1986	El día que me quieras	Sergio Dow	
1987	Making Mr. Right	Susan Seidelman	
1987	Less than Zero	Marek Kanievska	
1990	The Local Stigmatic	David Wheeler	
1990	Catchfire	Dennis Hopper	
1991	Mississippi Masala	Mira Nair	
1991	London Kills Me	Hanif Kureishi	
1992	Light Sleeper	Paul Schrader	
1992	My New Gun	Stacy Cochran	
1995	My Family	Gregory Nava	
1997	Touch	Paul Schrader	
1997	Selena	Gregory Nava	
1998	Why Do Fools Fall in Love	Gregory Nava	
1999	The Limey	Steven Soderbergh	
1999	The Virgin Suicides	Sofia Coppola	
2000	Erin Brockovich	Steven Soderbergh	
2001	Sweet November	Pat O'Connor	
2002	Simone	Andrew Niccol	
2002	Ken Park	Himself; Larry Clark	With Larry Clark
2002	Far from Heaven	Todd Haynes	
2004	Stryker	Noam Gonick	
2006	A Prairie Home Companion	Robert Altman	
2007	Hounddog	Deborah Kampmeier	With Jim Denault
2007	Import/Export	Ulrich Seidl	With Wolfgang Thaler
2007	I'm Not There	Todd Haynes	
2009	Life During Wartime	Todd Solondz	
2010	Howl	Rob Epstein; Jeffrey Friedman	
2012	Paradise: Love	Ulrich Seidl	With Wolfgang Thaler
2012	Paradise: Faith	Ulrich Seidl	With Wolfgang Thaler
2012	Dark Blood	George Sluizer	Shot in 1993
2013	Paradise: Hope	Ulrich Seidl	With Wolfgang Thaler
2015	Carol	Todd Haynes	
2016	Wiener-Dog	Todd Solondz	
2017	Wonderstruck	Todd Haynes	
2019	Dark Waters	Todd Haynes	
2023	El Conde	Pablo Larraín	
2024	Maria	Pablo Larraín	
TBA	The Exiles	Midi Z	Filming

==== Documentary film ====
Year	Title	Director	Notes
1977	La Soufrière	Werner Herzog	With Jörg Schmidt-Reitwein
1980	Lightning Over Water	Wim Wenders; Nicholas Ray	With Martin Schäfer
1982	Say Amen, Somebody	George T. Nierenberg	With Don Lenzer
1982	Report from Hollywood	Himself	With Mitch Dubin
1983	Spaces: The Architecture of Paul Rudolph	Bob Eisenhardt	With John Corso, Don Lenzer and Mark Obenhaus
1985	Tokyo-Ga	Wim Wenders	
1985	Ornette: Made in America	Shirley Clarke	
1985	I Played It for You	Ronee Blakley	
1985	Stripper	Jerome Gary	
1985	The Look	Robert Guralnick	
1986	Mother Teresa	Ann Petrie; Jeanette Petrie	With Sandi Sissel
1991	Soldiers of Music	Bob Eisenhardt; Susan Froemke; Albert Maysles	With Wolfgang Becker, Don Lenzer, Albert Maysles and Martin Schaer
1993	Theremin: An Electronic Odyssey	Steven M. Martin	With Frank G. DeMarco, Chris Lombardi and Robert Stone
2004	Cell Stories	Himself	Documentary short
2009	Collapse	Chris Smith	With Max Malkin and Chris Smith
2014	Cathedrals of Culture	Robert Redford	Segment "The Salk Institute"
2015	Don't Blink – Robert Frank	Laura Israel	With Lisa Rinzler
2021	The Velvet Underground	Todd Haynes	
2022	Louis Armstrong's Black & Blues	Sacha Jenkins	

==== Television ====
Year	Title	Director	Notes
1987	A Gathering of Old Men	Volker Schlöndorff	TV movie
1988	Karajan in Salzburg	Deborah Dickson; Susan Froemke	TV special
1993	TriBeCa	Michael Dinner	Episode "The Box"
1993	TV Operas	Bob Baldwin	Episode "Horse Opera"
2007	The Metropolitan Opera HD Live	Brian Large	Episode "The First Emperor"
2013	Daft Punk Random Access Memories: The Collaborators	Himself	Documentary series
2011	Mildred Pierce	Todd Haynes	Miniseries
2013	Six by Sondheim	Todd Haynes	Segment "I'm Still Here"

=== Director ===
Feature film

- Ken Park (2002)

TV movies

Year	Title	Notes
1989	Imagining America	Segment "Get Your Kicks on Route 66"
1990	Red Hot + Blue	Segment "Ev'ry Time We Say Goodbye"

== Awards and nominations ==
Organizations	Year	Category	Work	Result	Ref.
Academy Awards	2002	Best Cinematography	Far from Heaven	Nominated	
Academy Awards	2015	Best Cinematography	Carol	Nominated	
Academy Awards	2023	Best Cinematography	El Conde	Nominated	
Academy Awards	2024	Best Cinematography	Maria	Nominated	
BAFTA Awards	2015	Best Cinematography	Carol	Nominated	
Primetime Emmy Awards	2011	Outstanding Cinematography for a Limited Series	Mildred Pierce	Nominated	
Independent Spirit Awards	1986	Best Cinematography	True Stories	Nominated	
Independent Spirit Awards	1992	Best Cinematography	Light Sleeper	Nominated	
Independent Spirit Awards	2002	Best Cinematography	Far from Heaven	Won	
Independent Spirit Awards	2015	Best Cinematography	Carol	Won	
National Society of Film Critics	2002	Best Cinematography	Far from Heaven	Won	
National Society of Film Critics	2015	Best Cinematography	Carol	Won	
American Society of Cinematographers	2011	Outstanding Achievement in Cinematography in Television	Mildred Pierce	Nominated	
American Society of Cinematographers	2002	Outstanding Achievement in Cinematography in Theatrical Releases	Far from Heaven	Nominated	
American Society of Cinematographers	2015	Outstanding Achievement in Cinematography in Theatrical Releases	Carol	Nominated	
American Society of Cinematographers	2023	Outstanding Achievement in Cinematography in Theatrical Releases	El conde	Nominated	
American Society of Cinematographers	2024	Outstanding Achievement in Cinematography in Theatrical Releases	Maria	Won	
Bogotá Film Festival	1986	Best Cinematography	El día que me quieras	Won	
Jeonju International Film Festival	2002	Jeonju Daring Digital Award	Ken Park	Nominated	
Valladolid International Film Festival	2002	Golden Spike	Ken Park	Nominated	
Venice Film Festival	2002	Golden Osella	Far from Heaven	Won	
Satellite Awards	2002	Best Cinematography	Far from Heaven	Nominated	
British Society of Cinematographers	2015	Best Cinematography	Carol	Won	
Critics' Choice Movie Awards	2015	Best Cinematography	Carol	Nominated	
Florida Film Critics Circle	2017	Best Cinematography	Wonderstruck	Nominated	
