= Maria Hofstätter =

Austrian actress (born 1964)

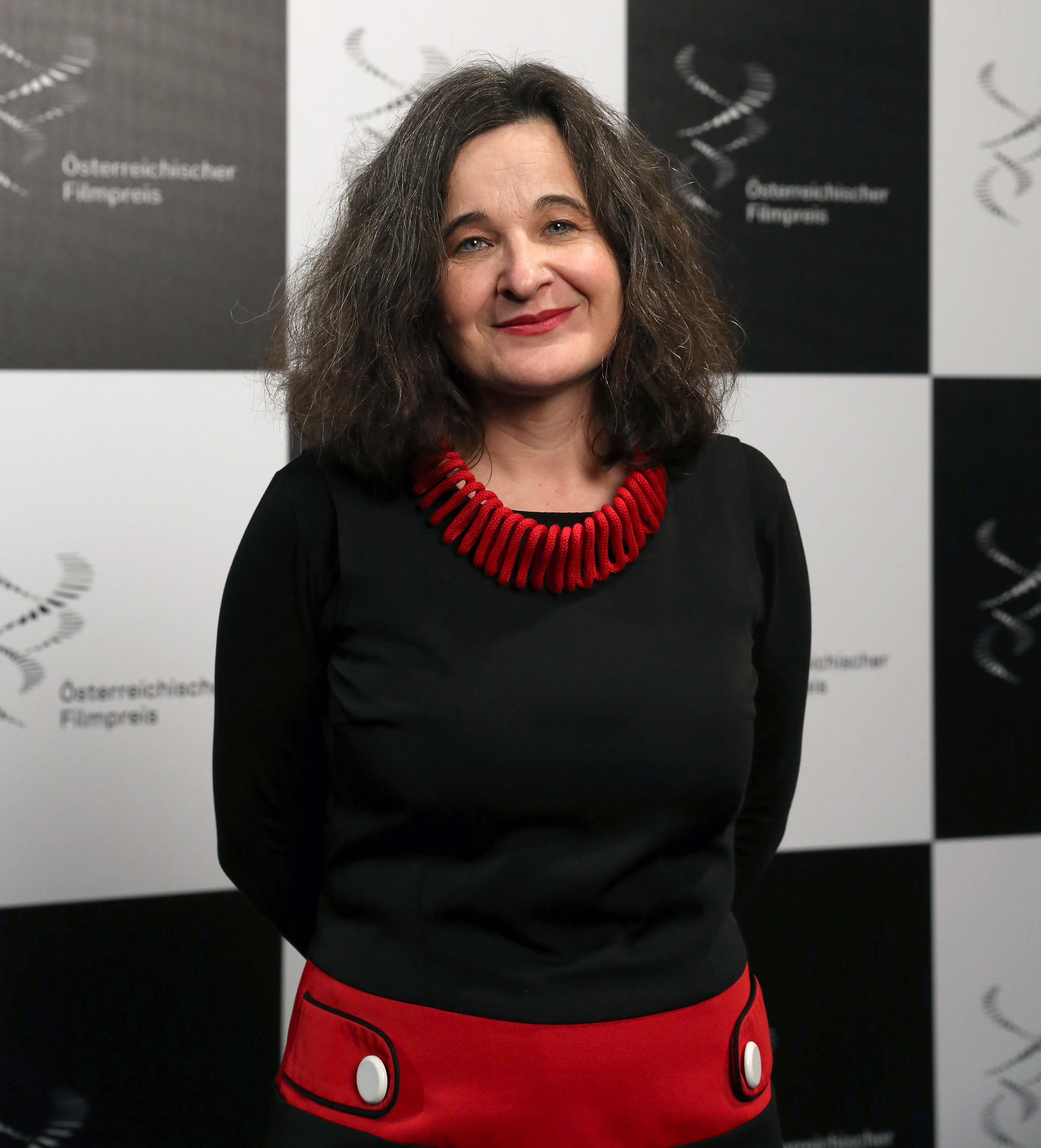
- Hofstätter at the Austrian Film Awards 2014
- Born: 30 March 1964 (age 62); Linz, Austria
- Occupation: Actress
- Years active: 1993–present

Maria Hofstätter (born 30 March 1964) is an Austrian actress. She has appeared in more than thirty films since 1993.

== Career ==
Hofstätter was born in Upper Austria, on 30 March 1964. She did not attend acting school and first appeared on stage for a bet. She has worked on films with directors such as Michael Glawogger, Paul Harather, Marc Rothemund, Harald Sicheritz (Poppitz) and Ulrich Seidl. Hofstätter played the hitchhiker in Seidl's first arthouse film, Dog Days in 2001. In 2012, she played the main role of Anna-Maria in the controversial second part of Seidl's Paradise trilogy, entitled Paradise: Faith. The Screen Daily review said that she "completely melts into the role, providing the backbone for the entire piece".

She has also performed roles on television series such as Braunschlag by David Schalko and acted in the theatre.

== Awards ==
Hofstätter won the Diagonale acting prize in 2013 and the Deutscher Schauspielpreis in 2021. She was awarded the Österreichischer Filmpreis in 2014 for her role in Paradise: Faith. For her performance in Fuchs im Bau, she won a Romy and another Österreichischer Filmpreis.

== Selected filmography ==
Year	Title	Role	Director(s)	Notes
1993	Indien		Paul Harather	
1995	Die Ameisenstraße		Michael Glawogger	
2001	Dog Days	The hitchhiker	Ulrich Seidl	
2002	Poppitz		Harald Sicheritz	
2007	Import/Export	Sister Maria	Ulrich Seidl	
2012	Paradise: Faith	Anna-Maria	Ulrich Seidl	
2014	Superegos	Mutter	Benjamin Heisenberg	
2024	The Devil's Bath	Mother Gänglin	Veronika Franz and Severin Fiala	
2024	Peacock	Vera	Bernhard Wenger	
2025	Welcome Home Baby	Mrs. Ramsauer	Andreas Prochaska	Premiere at the BIFF Panorama 2025
2026	The Stories	Elizabeth's mother	Abu Bakr Shawky	
