= Borderland State Park =

State park in Massachusetts, United States

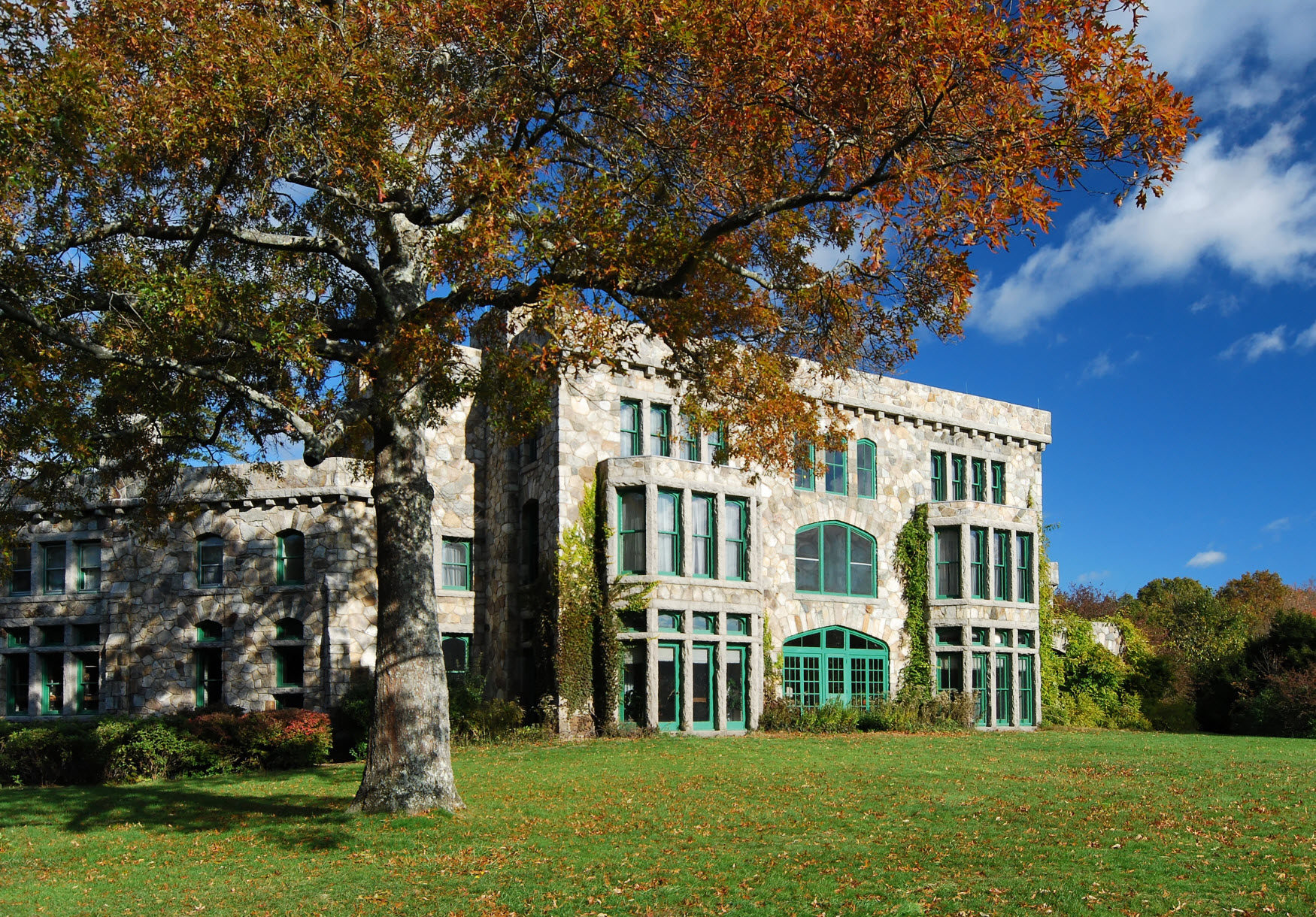
- Ames Mansion

- Location within Massachusetts Location within the United States
- Location: Easton and Sharon, Massachusetts, United States
- Coordinates: 42°03′54″N 71°09′16″W
- Area: 1,843 acres (746 ha)
- Elevation: 203 ft (62 m)
- Established: 1971
- Administrator: Massachusetts Department of Conservation and Recreation
- Website: Official website
- Borderland Historic District
- U.S. National Register of Historic Places
- U.S. Historic district
- Built: 1910
- Architect: Ames, Blanche Ames; Ames, Oakes
- Architectural style: Late Gothic Revival, Georgian, Colonial Revival
- NRHP reference No.: 97000497
- Added to NRHP: June 16, 1997

Borderland State Park is an American history and nature preserve with public recreational features located in the towns of Easton and Sharon, Massachusetts, United States. The state park encompasses 1,843 acres (746 ha) surrounding the Ames Mansion, which was built in 1910. The area was listed on the National Register of Historic Places as Borderland Historic District in 1997. It is operated by the Massachusetts Department of Conservation and Recreation, with an appointed advisory council that participates in policy decision-making.

== History ==
In 1906, Oakes Ames, a Harvard botanist (son of Massachusetts governor Oliver Ames and grandson of U.S. Representative Oakes Ames), and his wife Blanche Ames Ames (daughter of Mississippi governor Adelbert Ames, but not related to Oakes Ames), an artist and feminist, purchased land on the border of Sharon and Easton. There they built a mansion that includes Blanche Ames' studio, which still stands and created a nature preserve with woodland paths and roadways and man-made ponds. The family's home, a three-story, 20-room stone mansion constructed in 1910, was built largely at the direction of Blanche Ames. Her paintings still hang on the walls and much of the original furnishings are still intact. Ames mansion underwent restoration that began in 2009 and was completed in 2012. Two years after the death of Blanche Ames, Borderland became a state park after the Ames family sold the estate to the Commonwealth of Massachusetts for conservation purposes in 1971.

== Activities and amenities ==
The park has more than 20 miles (32 km) of wooded trails for hiking, mountain biking, and horseback riding. Trails include a portion of the Bay Circuit Trail and the Quarry Loop to Moyles Quarry which supplied the facing stone for the Canton Viaduct in 1835. The park features mansion tours, a visitors center, pond fishing and canoeing, ice skating, sledding, and disc golf. Mansion tours are typically held on Sundays during the months of April through May. The mansion is typically not open to the public other than during these tours, and for special events.

Borderland is the home course for Oliver Ames High School cross country team. Until 2014, it was the site of the Hockomock League Cross Country championship race. It is also utilized by the Old Colony League for its annual cross country meet and various invitational meets on the 3.1-mile-loop (5.0 km) course, and was the site of the World Masters Flying Disc Championships in 1996.

== In popular culture ==
The park has been used in a commercial, a documentary, and the film Mermaids. Scenes from the Martin Scorsese movie Shutter Island were shot at the stone lodge next to Leach Pond in 2008. Ames Mansion interiors were used as a filming location for Ghostbusters in 2015. A fictionalized version of the park is featured in the novels Disappearance at Devil's Rock and Survivor Song by Paul Tremblay. Interiors, particularly the library, were featured in the 2019 Rian Johnson film Knives Out as the home of mystery writer and murder victim Harlan Thrombey. Production designer David Crank stated, “The general rule was that both the inside and outside of the house needed to look like the sort of house that Harlan would describe in one of his mysteries. The moment we walked into the mansion we knew right away that it had the personality we needed.”

== Gallery ==
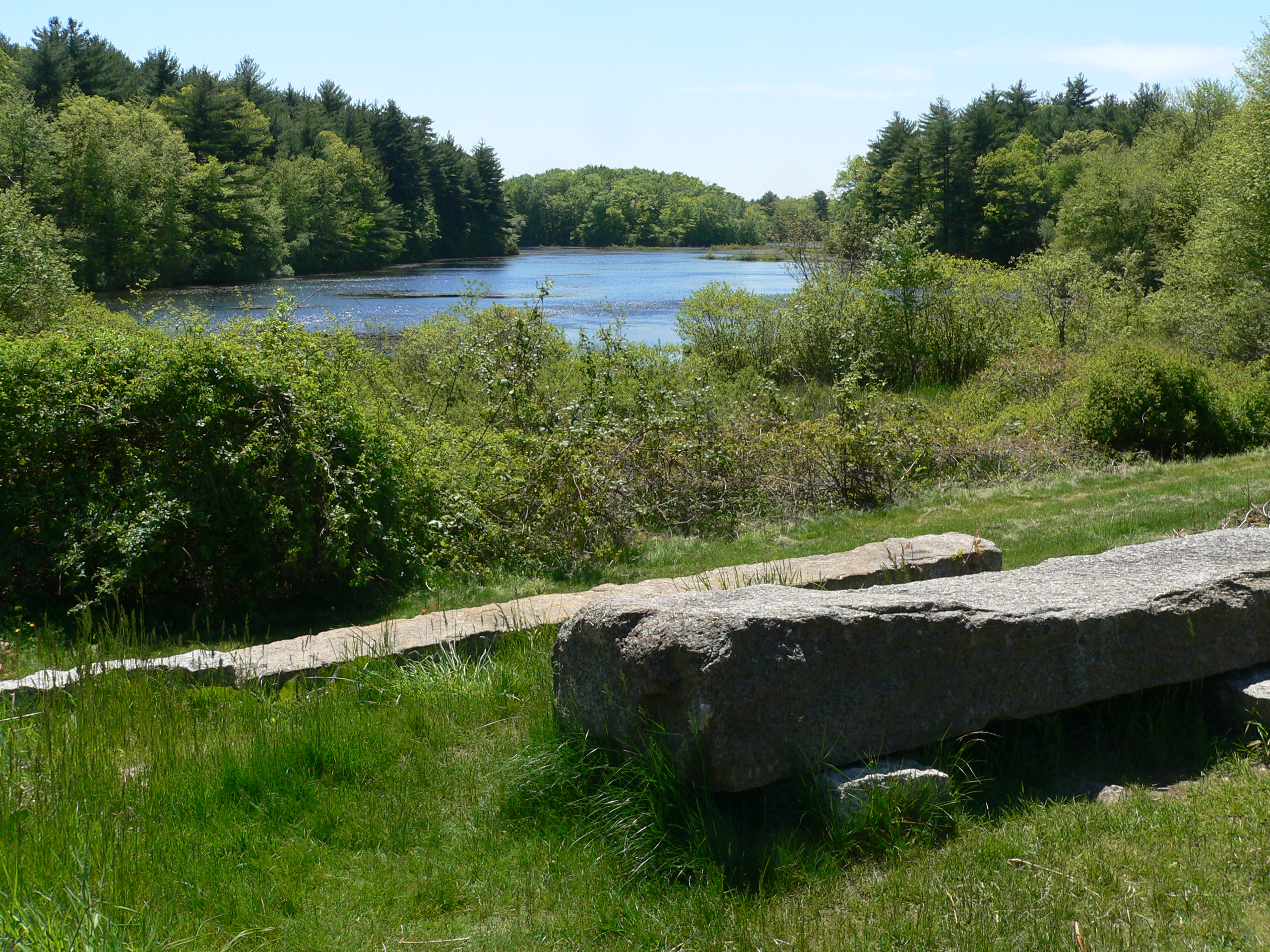

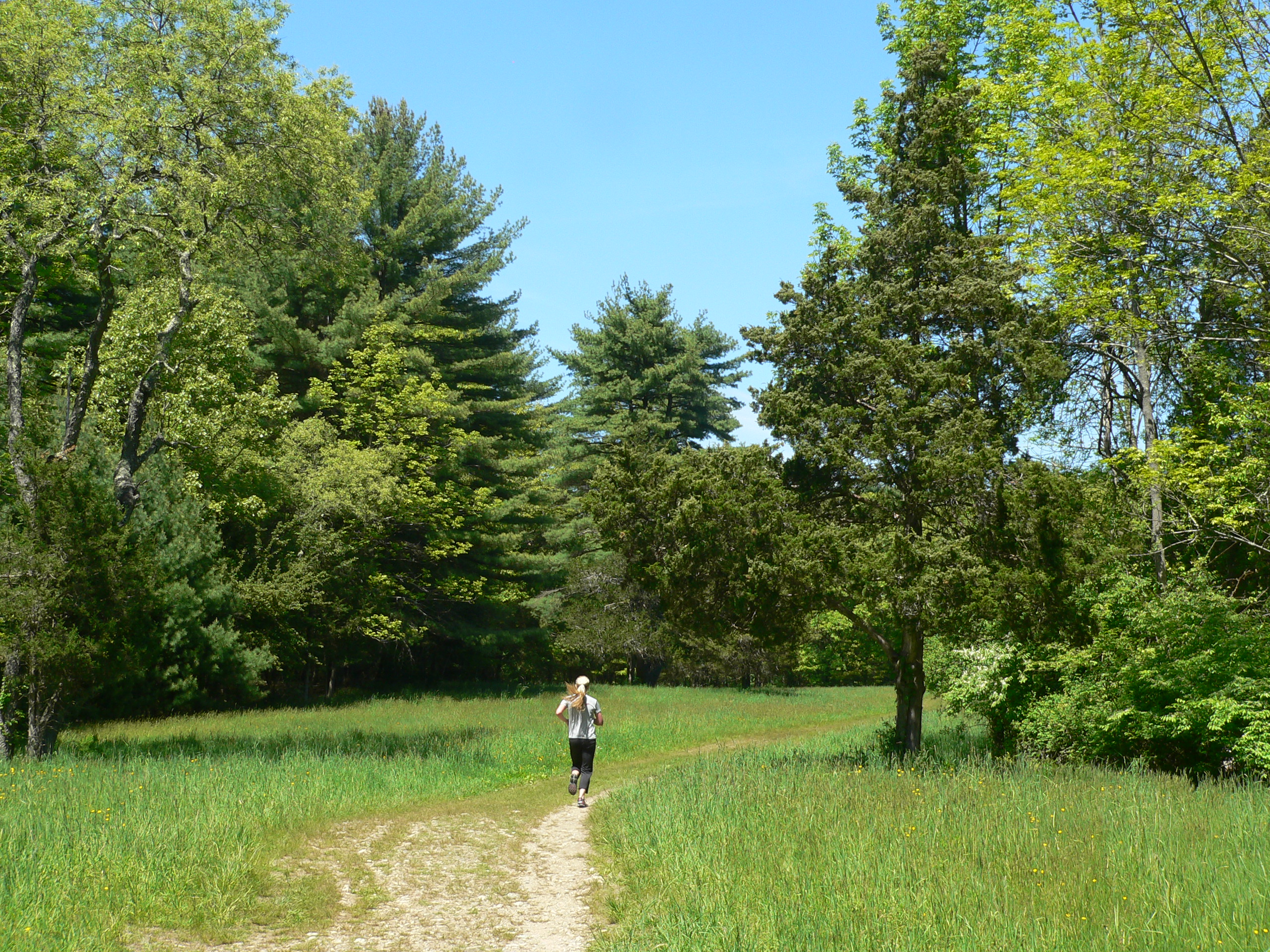

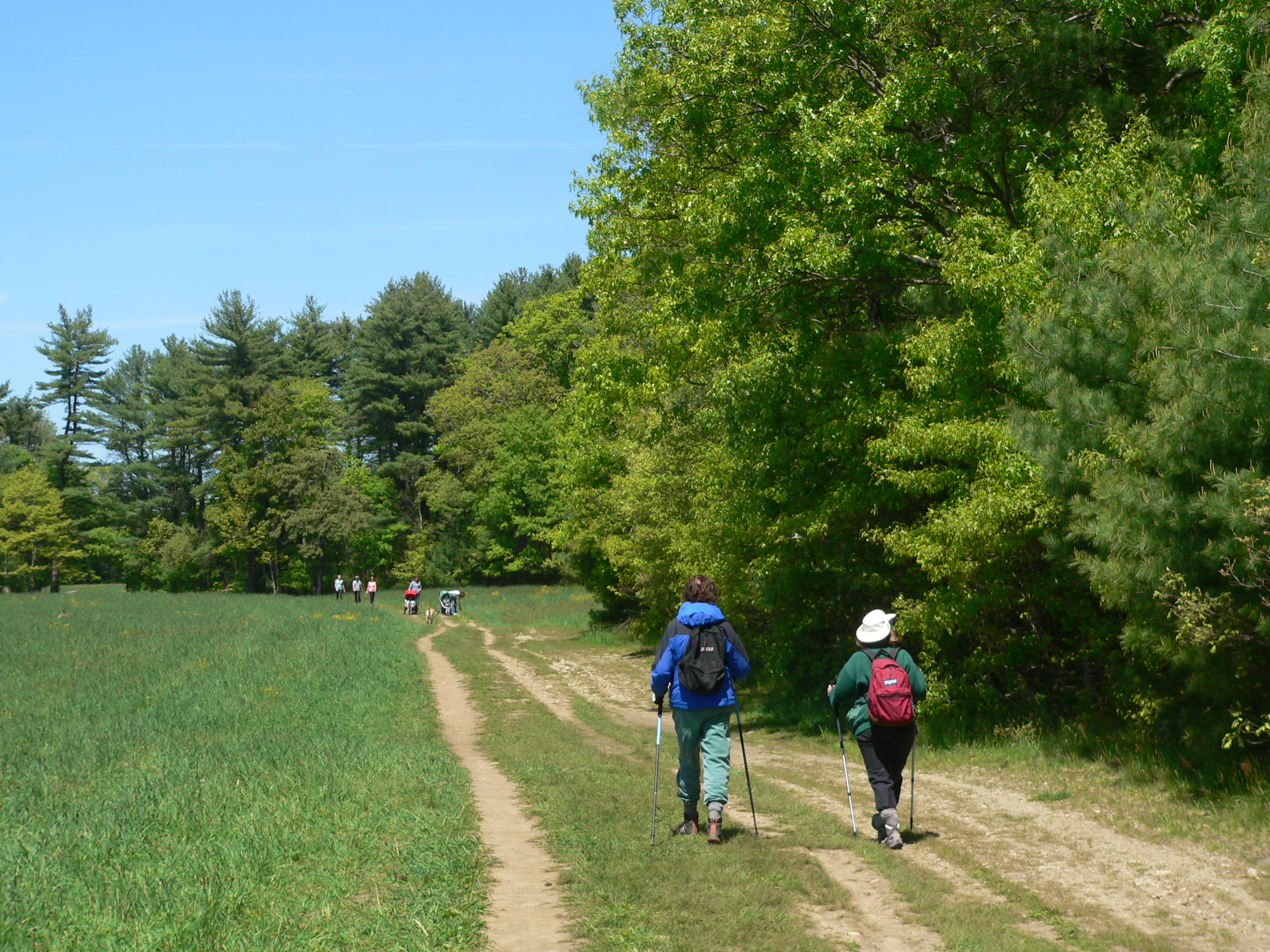

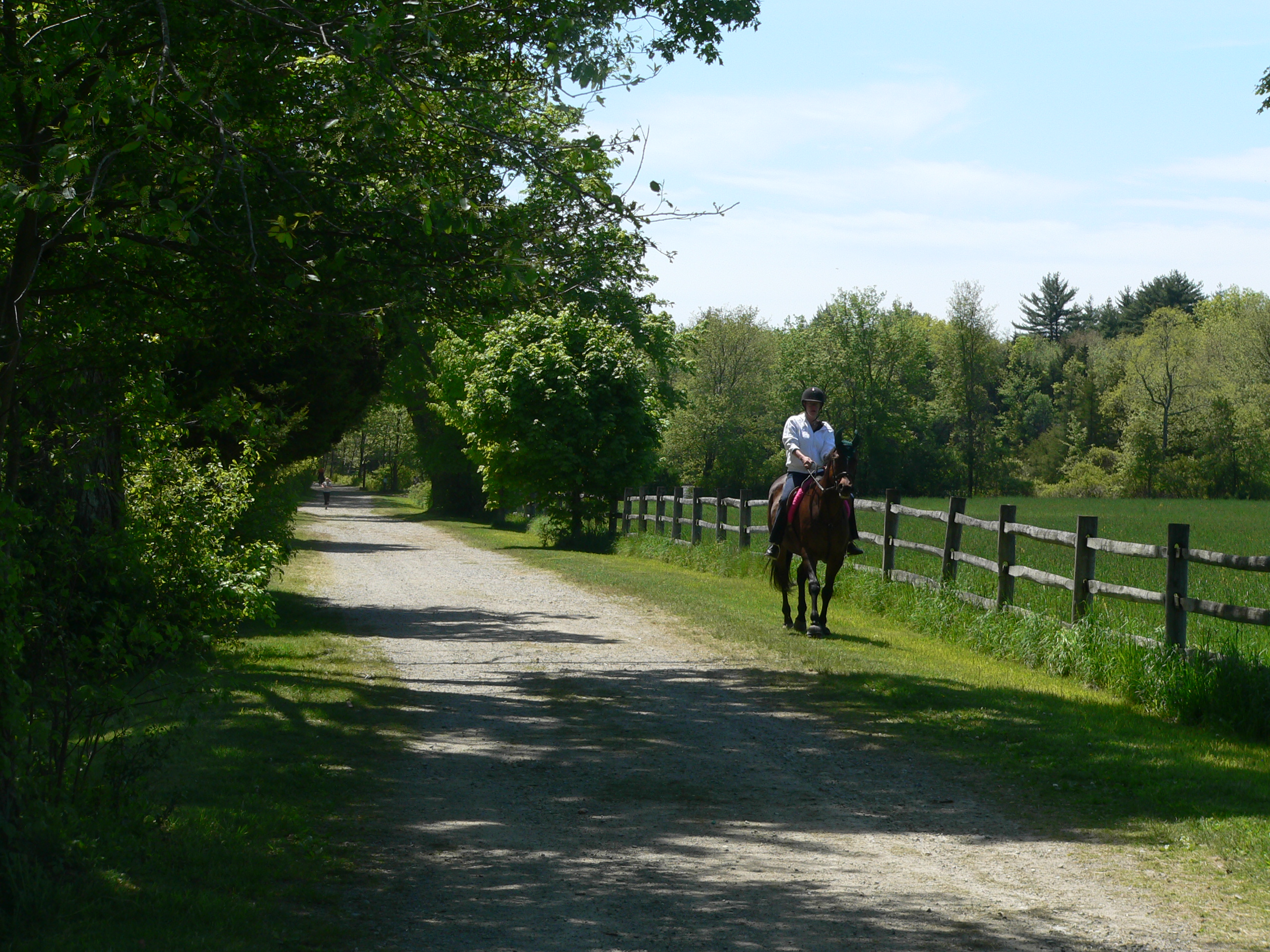

== See also ==
- National Register of Historic Places listings in Norfolk County, Massachusetts
- National Register of Historic Places listings in Bristol County, Massachusetts
