= A Head Full of Ghosts (film) =

Upcoming American psychological horror film

- Directed by: Veronika Franz; Severin Fiala
- Screenplay by: Veronika Franz; Severin Fiala
- Based on: A Head Full of Ghosts by Paul G. Tremblay
- Produced by: David Gambino; Susan Downey; Robert Downey Jr.; Daniel Dubiecki; Lara Alameddine
- Starring: David Harbour; Rebecca Hall; Esmé Creed-Miles; Bodhi Rae Breathnach; Fiona Dourif
- Cinematography: Jonathan Ricquebourg
- Production companies: Fifth Season; Team Downey; The Allegiance Theatre
- Distributed by: Lionsgate
- Country: United States
- Language: English

A Head Full of Ghosts is an upcoming American psychological horror film written and directed by Veronika Franz and Severin Fiala based on the 2015 novel by Paul G. Tremblay.

== Cast ==
- David Harbour as John Barrett
- Rebecca Hall
- Esmé Creed-Miles
- Bodhi Rae Breathnach as Marjorie Barrett
- Fiona Dourif
- Hollie Hill-Pearson as Meredith "Merry" Barrett

== Production ==
In May 2015, the film entered development at Focus Features with Ben Collins and Luke Piotrowski writing the screenplay and Robert Downey Jr.'s Team Downey and Dan Dubiecki's Allegiance Theater producing. The film is adapted from the 2015 horror novel by Paul G. Tremblay and produced by Fifth Season, Team Downey and The Allegiance Theatre. Producers are Daniel Dubiecki and Lara Alameddine from The Allegiance Theater, Susan Downey and Robert Downey Jr. for Team Downey, and David Gambino. In February 2024, Veronika Franz and Severin Fiala were announced to be directing the film.

Previously, Cross Creek Pictures, Team Downey, and The Allegiance Theater were in pre-production on the film in 2020, with Scott Cooper directing, Margaret Qualley attached to star, and STX Entertainment paying high seven figures for distribution rights for North and Latin America, the UK, and the Benelux.

In February 2026, Lionsgate acquired worldwide distribution rights to the film, with David Harbour, Rebecca Hall, and Esmé Creed-Miles in final negotiations to star and production beginning in March 2026, in Vancouver. Jonathan Ricquebourg serves as the cinematographer. Bodhi Rae Breathnach, Fiona Dourif, and Hollie Hill-Pearson joined the cast in April 2026.
