= The Cabin at the End of the World =

2018 novel by Paul Tremblay

- Author: Paul Tremblay
- Language: English
- Genre: Horror
- Published: 2018
- Preceded by: Disappearance at Devil's Rock
- Followed by: Survivor Song

The Cabin at the End of the World is a 2018 horror novel by American writer Paul Tremblay. The novel won the Horror Writers Association's Bram Stoker Award for Best Novel in 2019. It was adapted into the 2023 film Knock at the Cabin by director M. Night Shyamalan.

== Plot ==
Forty-year-old couple Andrew and Eric and their adopted seven-year-old daughter Wen leave their home in Cambridge, Massachusetts behind to spend a vacation in a secluded cabin in New Hampshire. Wen is approached by a large, mysterious man named Leonard, who says he is sad about what he has to do and that he needs Wen and her parents' help to save the world. The two spend time together catching grasshoppers, but Wen becomes suspicious when three other people show up with odd, makeshift weapons. Wen flees to warn Andrew and Eric.

The visitors break into the cabin and tie Andrew and Eric up. Leonard and his companions—Adriane, Redmond, and Sabrina—claim to have never met before this day and have no intention to harm the family, but in the last week, they have been compelled by visions and an unknown power to find the family. They foresee an upcoming apocalypse in which Leonard claims the oceans will rise, there will be plague, the sky will fall, and finally an unending darkness will descend. This can only be averted if the family kills one of their number as a sacrifice. Andrew and Eric believe they are lying and the attack is rooted in hate and delusions.

When the family refuses to choose, the visitors conduct a strange ritual in which they cover Redmond's head with a cloth mask and beat him to death with their weapons. Eric, who is concussed, believes he sees a figure of light as Redmond dies. On the TV, media reports devastating tsunamis, which Leonard says is the start of the apocalypse.

Andrew comes to believe that Redmond is actually Jeff O'Bannon, a man who assaulted Andrew in a bar thirteen years ago, for which he went to prison. Andrew believes O'Bannon tracked him down as revenge, though Eric is not sure that Redmond is O'Bannon. Leonard, Sabrina, and Adriane question if Andrew is right and struggle with their guilt, but maintain that they believe their visions. They reveal that Redmond's death has temporarily delayed the apocalypse.

The next day, as the intruders prepare to sacrifice Adriane, Andrew escapes the cabin and retrieves his gun from the car. He kills Adriane, but during a struggle with Leonard over the gun, Wen is accidentally shot and killed. Devastated, Leonard allows himself to be tied up by Eric and Andrew, but he says that Wen's death has not stopped the apocalypse because she was not a willing sacrifice, and Eric or Andrew still must die. Eric has begun to wonder if the story is true and has visions of flies that lead him to turn on the TV, which shows an outbreak of bird flu. Andrew insists the disasters are coincidental and the visitors were anticipating pre-scheduled news broadcasting. Sabrina describes how she and the other visitors were led by their visions and compulsions to find each other online, execute details of their plan such as creating their weapons, and to continue forward when they wanted to resist. She decides that, after Wen's death, she wants to abandon her task. Sabrina kills Leonard and offers to lead Eric and Andrew to Redmond's car. The TV shows seven spontaneous plane crashes taking place around the world, seemingly fulfilling the prediction of the sky falling.

The couple follow Sabrina into the forest, taking Wen's body; Sabrina recovers the car keys and a gun that Redmond hid. She tells Eric there is still time to prevent the apocalypse, then commits suicide before she can be further compelled. Eric considers taking his own life, but Andrew argues that even if the apocalypse is real, he refuses to obey a god that does not accept Wen's death as enough. They decide that neither wants to leave the other alone by dying. Grief-stricken, Eric and Andrew head for Redmond's car with Wen's body, deciding to stay together through whatever comes.

== Reception ==
Author Stephen King wrote that the novel was "thought-provoking and terrifying". Andrew Liptak of The Verge wrote, "Good horror stories look at the world around us to draw inspiration as to what could go wrong, and with this book, Tremblay has penned a story that's not only a nightmare as it plays out on the page, but one that's grimly reflective of the times that we live in."

== Film adaptation ==
Knock at the Cabin is an adaptation of The Cabin at the End of the World. It was written, directed, and produced by M. Night Shyamalan, and stars Dave Bautista, Jonathan Groff, Ben Aldridge, Nikki Amuka-Bird, and Rupert Grint. FilmNation Entertainment signed an option with Tremblay in late 2017, prior to the book's publication. Steve Desmond and Michael Sherman wrote the initial draft, and their script was rewritten by Shyamalan. The film was released by Universal Pictures on February 3, 2023.

The film deviates from the book, most notably in that Wen does not die and Eric is sacrificed, unambiguously averting the apocalypse. Additionally, the death order of Sabrina and Leonard is swapped.
