= List of Austrian films of 2014 =

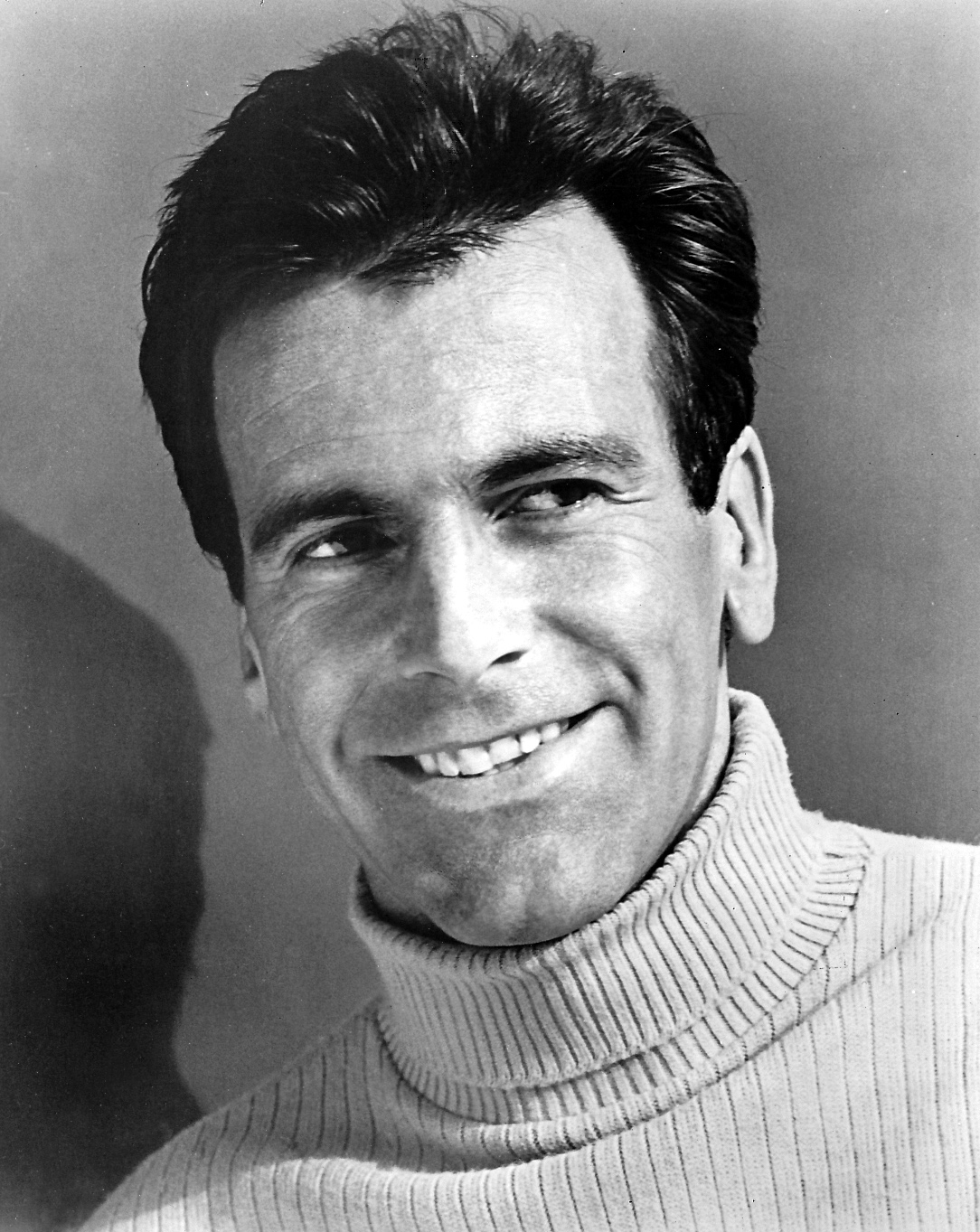
2014 saw the death of Maximilian Schell.

The Austrian film industry produced over fifty feature films in 2014. This article fully lists all non-pornographic films, including short films, that had a release date in that year and which were at least partly made by Austria. It does not include films first released in previous years that had release dates in 2014.

== Major releases ==
Opening		Title	Cast and crew	Studio	Genre(s)	Ref.
F E B R U A R Y	8	Beloved Sisters	Director: Dominik Graf; Cast: Hannah Herzsprung, Florian Stetter, Henriette Confurius		Biography	
F E B R U A R Y	9	Superegos	Director: Benjamin Heisenberg; Cast: André Wilms		Drama	
F E B R U A R Y	10	The Dark Valley	Director: Andreas Prochaska; Cast: Sam Riley		Western	
F E B R U A R Y	11	Fever	Director: Elfi Mikesch; Cast: Eva Mattes, Martin Wuttke		Drama	
F E B R U A R Y	14	Macondo	Director: Sudabeh Mortezai; Cast: Aslan Elbiev		Drama	
M A R C H	14	The Silent Mountain	Director: Ernst Gossner; Cast: William Moseley, Eugenia Costantini, Claudia Cardinale, Fritz Karl, Werner Daehn, Emily Cox, Brigitte Jaufenthaler, Harald Windisch		War; Drama	
M A Y	16	Amour Fou	Director: Jessica Hausner; Cast: Birte Schnöink, Christian Friedel, Stephan Grossmann	Coproduction Office	Comedy; Drama	
A U G U S T	22	Cam2Cam	Director: Joel Soisson; Cast: Tammin Sursok, Ben Wiggins, Sarah Bonrepaux	IFC Midnight	Horror; Thriller	
A U G U S T	30	Goodnight Mommy	Directors: Veronika Franz, Severin Fiala; Cast: Susanne Wuest	Ulrich Seidl Film Produktion GmbH	Horror	

== Minor releases ==
Title	Director	Release date	Genre
About 12	Martín Shanly	11 December 2015 (Spain)	
Abschied	Ludwig Wüst	15 February 2014 (Austria)	Drama
Adam	David Lapuch	11 October 2014 (Austria)	Drama
Amour fou	Jessica Hausner	5 December 2014 (UK)	Comedy
...and the Rest is History	Niko Kühnel	September 2014 (Germany)	Comedy
Arabella	Brian Large	22 September 2014 (Germany)	Musical
Biest	Stefan Müller	12 April 2014 (Austria)	Horror
Boys Like Us	Patric Chiha	3 September 2014 (France)	Comedy
Casanova Variations	Michael Sturminger	19 November 2014 (France)	Biography
Cracks in Concrete	Umut Dag	19 September 2014 (Austria)	Drama
DMD KIU LIDT: Die Manifestation des Kapitalismus in unserem Leben ist die Traurigkeit	Georg Tiller	February 2014 (Germany)	Musical
A European Citizen Called Bob...	Leonard Thimo	18 October 2014 (Austria)	Biography
Forgotten	Stefan Stis	15 February 2014 (Austria)	Drama
Grüningers Fall	Alain Gsponer	31 January 2014 (Austria)	Drama
Hedda Gabler	Mikael Kreuzriegler		Drama
High Performance	Johanna Moder	28 March 2014 (Austria)	Comedy
Kafka, Kiffer und Chaoten	Kurt Palm	9 May 2014 (Austria)	Comedy
Kommissar Taler	Victoria Halper		Comedy
Leonhards Geschichte	Josef Lichtenberger	12 April 2014 (Austria)	Mystery
Der letzte Tanz	Houchang Allahyari	12 June 2014 (Austria)	Drama
Lichttonfilm	Elke Groen	12 February 2014 (Germany)	
Die Mamba	Ali Samadi Ahadi	10 April 2014 (Austria)	Action
La Petite Mort II	Marcel Walz	14 September 2014 (Germany)	Horror
PURE: A Shades of Winter Movie	Mario Feil		Action
Reflections of Maya Rose	Alexandra Wedenig	5 April 2014 (Austria)	Drama
Rise Up! And Dance	Barbara Gräftner	12 March 2014 (Austria)	Comedy
Rough Road Ahead	Christian Frosch	12 March 2015 (Germany)	Drama
Sarah & Sarah	Peter Kern	20 March 2014 (Austria)	Drama
Schwarze Kobra	Hamid Mafitabar		Drama
Schwarze Welt	Martin Fischer	25 April 2014 (Germany)	Drama
Servus Ishq	Sandeep Kumar	13 June 2014 (Austria)	Drama
Sin & Illy Still Alive	Maria Hengge		Crime
Spleen	Marc Rodríguez	23 January 2014 (USA)	Drama
Stimmen	Mara Mattuschka	2 November 2014 (Austria)	Comedy
Therapy for a Vampire	David Rühm	19 December 2014 (Austria)	Comedy
Übernacht	Jolanta Warpechowski	4 April 2014 (Austria)	Drama
Und Äktschn!	Frederick Baker	6 February 2014 (Germany)	Comedy
Urania Descending	Tav Falco		Drama
Vals	Anita Lackenberger	13 November 2014 (Austria)	Drama
Where I Belong	Fritz Urschitz	15 October 2014 (USA)	Drama
Wir Vier	Alexander Mayer		Drama
The Woods Are Still Green	Marko Nabersnik	12 September 2014 (Austria)	Drama
Der Zwergengarten von Mirabell - Skurrile Meisterwerke aus Stein	Christian Hager	17 June 2014 (Austria)	Historical

== Notable deaths ==
Month	Date	Name	Age	Nationality	Profession	Notable films
February	1	Maximilian Schell	83	Austrian-Swiss	Actor	Judgment at Nuremberg; Deep Impact
May	29	Karlheinz Böhm	86	German-Austrian	Actor	The Wonderful World of the Brothers Grimm; Peeping Tom
July	18	Dietmar Schönherr	88	Austrian-Spanish	Actor	The Longest Day; Coast of Skeletons
September	19	Peggy Drake	91	Austrian-American	Actress	The Tuttles of Tahiti; King of the Mounties

== See also ==
- 2014 in film
- 2014 in Austria
- Cinema of Austria
- List of Austrian submissions for the Academy Award for Best Foreign Language Film
