= Paradise: Love =

2012 drama film directed by Ulrich Seidl

- Directed by: Ulrich Seidl
- Written by: Ulrich Seidl; Veronika Franz
- Produced by: Ulrich Seidl
- Starring: Margarethe Tiesel; Peter Kazungu; Inge Maux
- Cinematography: Wolfgang Thaler; Ed Lachman
- Edited by: Christof Schertenleib
- Production companies: Ulrich Seidl Film; Coproduction Office
- Distributed by: Stadtkino Filmverleih
- Release dates: 18 May 2012 (Cannes); 3 January 2013 (Germany)
- Running time: 120 minutes
- Country: Austria
- Languages: German; English
- Budget: €3.6 million
- Box office: $1.7 million

Paradise: Love (German: Paradies: Liebe) is a 2012 drama film directed by Ulrich Seidl and co-written with Veronika Franz. It tells the story of a 50-year-old Austrian woman who travels to Kenya as a sex tourist.

An Austrian production with co-producers in Germany and France, it is the first installment in Seidl's Paradise trilogy, a project first conceived as one film with three parallel stories; succeeded by Faith and Hope. Paradise: Love competed at the 2012 Cannes Film Festival. It subsequently screened within such festivals as Toronto International Film Festival, Maryland Film Festival and New Zealand International Film Festival.

== Plot ==
50-year-old Austrian woman Teresa is on holiday in a beach resort in Kenya. With the encouragement of other middle-aged women at the resort, she encounters younger men and has sex with them. At the same time, she worries whether they really find her attractive, and she often expresses concerns about her age, weight and appearance. Although the men profess love for her, some from the first moment they see her, she is wary at first. The men persist, calling her "Schatz" (treasure) and "love," but ultimately they are soliciting her money. The importance of these "sugar mama" tourists is evident when the women leave the resort and are constantly solicited and approached by groups of men who profess their love in German and English.

She builds a brief relationship with a man named Munga, who has sex with her and introduces her to a woman he claims is his sister. Together, they convince Teresa to give them several thousand shillings (hundreds of Euros) for their relatives in the hospital and for her baby by claiming that his father abandoned her. Over the course of a few scenes, Munga and his relatives manage to pressure her into giving more and more money until her wallet is literally empty. It becomes clear that he is interested entirely in her money, but at the same time, she objectifies him by taking nude photos of him while he sleeps. She eventually loses touch with him and returns to her hotel, later finding him in the sea with the woman he claimed was his sister. She realizes that the woman is actually his wife and confronts him, pulling his hair and slapping him.

She meets another man on the beach and begins another sexual relationship, which ends abruptly when he also asks her for money.

Teresa tries several times to call her daughter back in Austria, but is consistently unable to reach her. She leaves messages to remind her that she would like to receive a call on her birthday, but never manages to make contact. Teresa's friends hire a male stripper for her birthday, who dances nude for them. They are disappointed that they do not succeed much in sexually arousing him, despite dancing, taking their clothes off, and touching him all over.

Later Teresa invites the bartender of her resort into her room and instructs him to kiss her on various body parts, which he does. When she tells him to kiss her genital area, however, he refuses. Angrily, she tells him to get out and cries alone on the bed.

== Cast ==
- Margarethe Tiesel as Teresa
- Peter Kazungu as Munga
- Inge Maux as Teresa's friend
- Dunja Sowinetz
- Helen Brugat
- Gabriel Mwarua
- Josphat Hamisi
- Carlos Mkutano

== Production ==
=== Development ===
The origin of the film was a screenplay Ulrich Seidl wrote with his wife Veronika Franz, consisting of six stories about Westerners who travel to developing countries as tourists. Sex tourism became a recurring motif in the script. The project was then reworked to focus more on a single family, and was in that incarnation supposed to be a 130-minute feature film with the title Paradise, consisting of three parallel stories, each focusing on one family member—two adult sisters and a daughter—searching for paradisiac experiences.

The story that became Paradise: Love was the most elaborated of the three. Seidl considered setting it in other parts of the world where female sex tourism is common, but chose Kenya, and Africa, partially because the colonial history would add another layer to the film. The team traveled in Kenya for two years looking for the right locations. Casting of the lead actress took one year before Margarethe Tiesel won the part. The cast is a mix of professionals and first-time actors; the "Beach Boys" were locals found on the Kenyan beaches.

The film was produced through the director's Austrian company Ulrich Seidl Film, with Germany's Tat Film and France's Société Parisienne as co-producers. Further co-production support came from the broadcasters ORF, Arte and Degeto. The project received funding from Österreichisches Filminstitut, Filmfonds Wien, Land Niederösterreich, Eurimages, the French National Center of Cinematography and Medien- und Filmgesellschaft Baden-Württemberg.

=== Filming ===
Principal photography of the whole three-part project took place between 22 October 2009 and 14 September 2010 in Kenya and Vienna. Everything was shot on location, so that real events could be captured along with the fictitious content. The hotel in the film is the Flamingo Beach Resort & Spa Mombasa. Several street scenes are shot in front of the hotel. The screenplay contained instructions for what information each scene would contain, but no scripted lines, and was constantly reworked during filming. Scenes were shot chronologically to make unexpected turns possible and leave the ending open. As Seidl had difficulties choosing one of the two final candidates for the male lead, he decided to start filming with both and changed the story according to how it played out. In the script, the main character had been an experienced sex tourist, but when Seidl saw the actors interact, he decided to rewrite it as her first time in Kenya, as it would look more credible that way.

=== Post-production ===
Editing of the whole project took one year and a half. Seidl went through many rough cuts of which he thought several were good films, but realised that no matter what, it was going to end up five and a half hours long. He also thought the three different stories weakened each other, instead of making each other more interesting. The decision was then taken to split the project into three separate films, and release them as a trilogy.

== Release ==
Paradise: Love premiered on 18 May 2012 in competition at the 65th Cannes Film Festival. The trilogy's other installments, Paradise: Faith and Paradise: Hope, are planned to appear at forthcoming film festivals.

=== Critical response ===
Allan Hunter of Screen International wrote: "Love adheres to [Seidl's] methods of working without a traditional script and developing individual scenes from detailed planning and the interaction of professional and non-professional actors. In Love, that results in memorable, highly convincing naturalistic moments as Teresa discusses her desires and vulnerability with a giggly fellow sex tourist or bitterly confronts the reality of a country where love is a transaction rather than a genuine response of the heart. It also creates a rambling, overlong film that just doesn’t grip sufficiently to overcome the predictability of the story." Leslie Felperin wrote in Variety: "Ulrich Seidl's Paradise: Love is hardly the first film to explore the world of wealthy women and the young studs who service them; it's not even the first to do it in a sex-tourism context, having been beaten to the punch by 2006's Heading South. But it sure as hell is the dirtiest. ... Repulsive and sublimely beautiful, arguably celebratory and damning of its characters, it's hideous and masterful all at once, Salo with sunburn." Also Screen International and The Hollywood Reporter compared the film to Heading South in their reviews.
