= Basement (disambiguation) =

A basement is one or more floors of a building that are either completely or partially below the ground floor.

Basement or The Basement may also refer to:

== Film and TV ==
- Basement (2010 film), a British horror film
- Basement (2014 film), a Filipino horror film
- The Basement (film), a 2017 American horror film
- "The Basement" (Luke Cage), an episode of Luke Cage
- "The Basement", a fictional intelligence agency in the Indian film Dhruva Natchathiram

== Music ==
- Basement (band), a British emo band from Ipswich
- "Basement", a song by Fitz and the Tantrums from All the Feels
- "Basement", a song by Puddle Of Mudd from Come Clean
- "Basement", a 2018 track by Toby Fox from Deltarune Chapter 1 OST from the video game Deltarune
- "The Basement", a song by Pete Rock & CL Smooth from their 1992 album Mecca and the Soul Brother
- Old Church Basement, a 2021 album by Elevation Worship

== Other uses ==
- Basement (geology), rock that lies below sedimentary rocks
- The Basement, former name of a theatre venue within the Metro Arts Theatre
- The Basement (play), a 1967 television play by Harold Pinter
- The Basement: Meditations on a Human Sacrifice, a 1979 book by Kate Millett

== See also ==
- Basement 5, a British reggae punk fusion band from London
- In the Basement (film), a 2014 Austrian documentary film
