= Dog Days (2001 film) =

2001 film by Ulrich Seidl

- Poster
- Directed by: Ulrich Seidl
- Written by: Ulrich Seidl; Veronika Franz
- Produced by: Philippe Bober; Helmut Grasser
- Cinematography: Wolfgang Thaler; Helmut Grasser
- Edited by: Christof Schertenleib; Andrea Wagner
- Release date: 3 September 2001 (Venice Film Festival)
- Running time: 121 minutes
- Country: Austria
- Language: German

Dog Days (German: Hundstage) is a 2001 Austrian feature film directed by Ulrich Seidl. The film stars a mix of professional and amateur actors and follows six interwoven stories set in suburban Vienna over the course of some unseasonably hot summer days. The film premiered at the 2001 Venice Film Festival where it went on to win the Grand Special Jury Prize and also won awards at the International Film Festival Bratislava and the Gijón International Film Festival.

== Plot ==
The film is set in Vienna during a week of unseasonably hot summer weather and has six interconnected narrative streams. An alarm systems engineer attempts to capture someone damaging cars, an old man interacts with various people including his housekeeper, a young man treats his girlfriend badly, a teacher has a date with her lover which goes wrong, a divorced couple are dealing with the death of their child and a mentally disturbed hitchhiker asks her drivers rude questions.

== Cast ==
- The hitchhiker – Maria Hofstätter
- The old man – Erich Finsches
- The old man's housekeeper – Gerti Lehner
- The young woman – Franziska Weisz
- The young woman's boyfriend – Rene Wanko
- The ex-husband – Victor Rathbone
- The ex-wife – Claudia Martini
- The teacher – Christine Jirku
- The lover – Viktor Hennemann
- The lover's friend — Georg Friedrich
- The masseur — Christian Bakonyi
- The alarm systems engineer – Alfred Mrva

== Production ==
Ulrich Seidl made the film over three years, recruiting most of the cast as non-professional actors. Alfred Mrva plays the role of an alarm systems engineer whilst being an alarm systems engineer in real life and Viktor Hennemann who plays a lover in the film runs a swingers club.

== Critical response ==
The Guardian review gave the film three stars out of five and called it a "disturbing vision of Viennese suburbanites suffocating in sweltering heat". The BBC reviewer discussed the torture scene and declared "Seidl himself relishes portraying this unpleasantness", whilst Screen Daily stated "Dog Days announces the arrival of a visionary, uncompromising director".

== Accolades ==
The film premiered at and won the Grand Special Jury Prize at the Venice Film Festival in 2001. It also received the FIPRESCI prize at the 2001 International Film Festival Bratislava. Maria Hofstätter was awarded best actress at the 2001 Gijón International Film Festival.
