= The Devil's Bath =

2024 film by Veronika Franz and Severin Fiala

- Theatrical release poster
- German: Des Teufels Bad
- Directed by: Veronika Franz; Severin Fiala
- Screenplay by: Veronika Franz; Severin Fiala
- Based on: Suicide by Proxy in Early Modern Germany: Crime, Sin and Salvation by Kathy Stuart
- Produced by: Ulrich Seidl; Bettina Brokemper
- Starring: Anja Plaschg
- Cinematography: Martin Gschlacht
- Edited by: Michael Palm
- Music by: Soap&Skin
- Production companies: Ulrich Seidl Filmproduktion GmbH; Heimatfilm
- Distributed by: Filmladen
- Release dates: 20 February 2024 (Berlinale); 8 March 2024 (Austria)
- Running time: 121 minutes
- Countries: Austria; Germany
- Language: Austrian German
- Box office: $55,640

The Devil's Bath (German: Des Teufels Bad) is a 2024 historical horror drama film written and directed by Veronika Franz and Severin Fiala, and starring Anja Plaschg. The film is based on the book Suicide by Proxy in Early Modern Germany: Crime, Sin and Salvation by Kathy Stuart, as well as the criminal trial records for Agnes Catherina Schickin (Württemberg, Germany, 1704) and Eva Lizlfellnerin (Puchheim, Austria, 1761-62). An international co-production between Austria and Germany, the film tells the story of Agnes, a young married woman, who does not feel at home in her husband's world.

The film had its world premiere at the Main Competition of the 74th Berlin International Film Festival, on 20 February 2024, where it competed for the Golden Bear. It was released in Austria on 8 March 2024, and received positive reviews from critics. The film was selected as the Austrian entry for Best International Feature Film at the 97th Academy Awards, but was not nominated.

== Plot ==
A woman drops a baby off a waterfall before walking to a church to confess her crime. The film cuts to night, slowly tilting up the body of the now decapitated woman sitting in a chair, her head in a cage behind her. The body is missing some toes and fingers and, as we watch, an unseen person cuts off one of the dead woman's remaining fingers with a knife, wrapping it in a cloth.

The next day, Agnes and Wolf are wed and they move into a house Wolf has purchased for them. That night, Agnes sees a drunk Wolf tell his best friend Lenz that he is handsome, with Lenz replying that he likes him, too. Agnes's brother gives her a gift: the severed finger of the dead woman from the beginning of the film. Back at her house, Agnes kisses the finger and places it under her mattress hoping it will help her conceive a child. However, when a drunk Wolf returns later, he tells her to turn around, masturbates, and goes to sleep.

Agnes wakes alone in bed. After searching the house and stables, she quickly dresses and sets off to find Wolf. She meets a woman and two children and asks them to lead her to the pond where Wolf works as a fisherman. They agree, and start leading her through the woods, but run off and hide, leaving Agnes lost. She stumbles across a drawing posted on a tree, detailing the woman throwing her child down the waterfall and her subsequent execution. A few feet away, she discovers the corpse of the woman, sitting upright in a chair on a small altar.

That night, Agnes once again tries to initiate sex with a now sober Wolf, but she is rebuffed and Wolf goes to sleep. The next day at church, a somewhat despondent Agnes prays to a wax doll of baby Jesus for a child. Agnes wakes early and makes it to a pond where Wolf works as a fisherman before everyone else, hoping to prove her worth by catching some fish, but gets stuck in the mud. When Wolf and the other workers arrive, he admonishes her for being so reckless and tells her she could have drowned. That night, someone pounds on their door and tells Wolf that Lenz has hanged himself. After rushing to the scene he and his friends take the body away while Lenz's mother begs them to let her bury him.

The next day, the priest gives a sermon to the town and explains that Lenz cannot be buried because suicide is a sin and what he did is worse than murder. He goes on to say that the woman who threw her baby down the waterfall was at least saved because she received confession before her execution, so she was forgiven. While walking home, Agnes harms herself by cutting her tongue, then lies down near the headless corpse of the waterfall woman. She returns home late again and overhears Wolf's mother complaining to him about Agnes, calling her a burden for not getting pregnant. Agnes grows more depressed and instead of going inside, returns to the altar and sings to the head of the dead woman all night.

The next morning, Agnes's brother finds her asleep in his barn. She begs her brother to let her stay, but he tells Wolf, who tries to get her to come home. When she tries to run away, he overpowers her and carries her back. A despondent Agnes refuses to get up or do her chores. Food rots and the goats become sick and infected, having to be put down. Agnes is sent to a barber, where he sews a piece of horse hair through the back of her neck and tells her she needs to repeatedly shift it from side to side so that the wound festers and the "poison" in her head leaches out. On her way home, she finds an unattended baby in the woods and brings it home with her. She tells Wolf and his mother that it's a miracle, but they are horrified and force her to return it.

As her depression worsens, Agnes decides to kill herself by eating rat poison. Wracked with pain and vomiting, she begs Wolf to get her a priest. He leaves, but returns alone, telling her the priest was not home, but that they can go together and see him the next day. Distraught that she might die without confessing, she admits that she's eaten rat poison and he forces her to vomit it up. In the morning, he and his mother dress Agnes and Wolf carries her back to her mother and brother's farm, telling them that she's in the Devil's bath and tried to kill herself.

The next morning, Agnes awakens early, dresses, and walks back toward the town. Along the way, she finds a group of children collecting wood by a pond and asks a young boy to lead her to a small shrine in the woods. She promises him payment if he'll say a small prayer with her, but when he finishes, she stabs him in the neck. He survives the initial cut and begins screaming for help. She tells him that now he'll never sin and will be an angel before God as she slits his throat and he dies in her arms. She then goes to the church and tells them she's committed a crime.

Agnes is locked in a cell and gives confession to the priest, admitting that she no longer wishes to live in this world, but wanted absolution before she died. She murdered the boy knowing she'd be able to give her final confession before being executed because she couldn't see another way out. The priest absolves her of her sins and she begins to laugh and weep uncontrollably.

A now catatonic Agnes is wrapped, sewn into an animal skin, and dragged through town to the altar where she will be executed. As a hood is placed over her head by the executioner, she begins to sing quietly. A young girl in the crowd recognizes the song and sings along with her. The song ends abruptly as the executioner beheads Agnes with a sword. While Wolf weeps, the crowd surges forward and musicians begin playing a jaunty tune. The blood spurting from Agnes's neck is collected in a bucket and the townspeople pay to dip in their cups and bowls, believing that drinking the blood of executed prisoners wards against melancholy.

== Cast ==
- Anja Plaschg as Agnes
- Maria Hofstätter as Mother Gänglin
- David Scheid as Wolf
- Natalija Baranova as Ewa Schikin
- Lukas Walcher as Luke
- Claudia Martini
- Agnes Lampl
- Camilla Schielin

== Production ==
=== Background ===
The film is based on the historical research of Kathy Stuart who reconstructed the practice of "suicide by proxy," a novel crime that was common in the seventeenth and eighteenth centuries in German-speaking Central Europe and Scandinavia. Suicidal people feared eternal damnation that direct suicide entailed, so they found a detour. They committed a capital crime and then immediately turned themselves in to authorities and demanded their execution. The perpetrators hoped that after repentance, confession, eucharist, and religiously framed public execution, they would achieve salvation. This crime was committed predominantly by women. The character of Agnes is based largely on the historical perpetrator Eva Lizlfellnerin (c. 1736–1762), an Upper Austrian peasant.

The film was produced by Ulrich Seidl Filmproduktion GmbH (Austria) in co-production with Heimatfilm (Germany). The production was funded by the Austrian Film Institute, Vienna Film Fund, Film Location Austria (FISA) and the state of Lower Austria, German Film Fund, Film and Media Foundation NRW and Eurimages; with additional support from Austrian Broadcasting Corporation, Bayerischer Rundfunk and Arte.

=== Filming ===
The film was shot for over 40 days from 1 November 2020 to 29 January 2022 in Litschau, Lower Austria and North Rhine-Westphalia. In January 2022 last schedule of filming was done among other places, at the Neuenberg castle ruins near the town of Scheel in the municipality of Lindlar in the Oberbergisches Land. Over 400 extras and small actors were employed for an execution scene in December 2021 to suit the historical setting of the period.

== Release ==
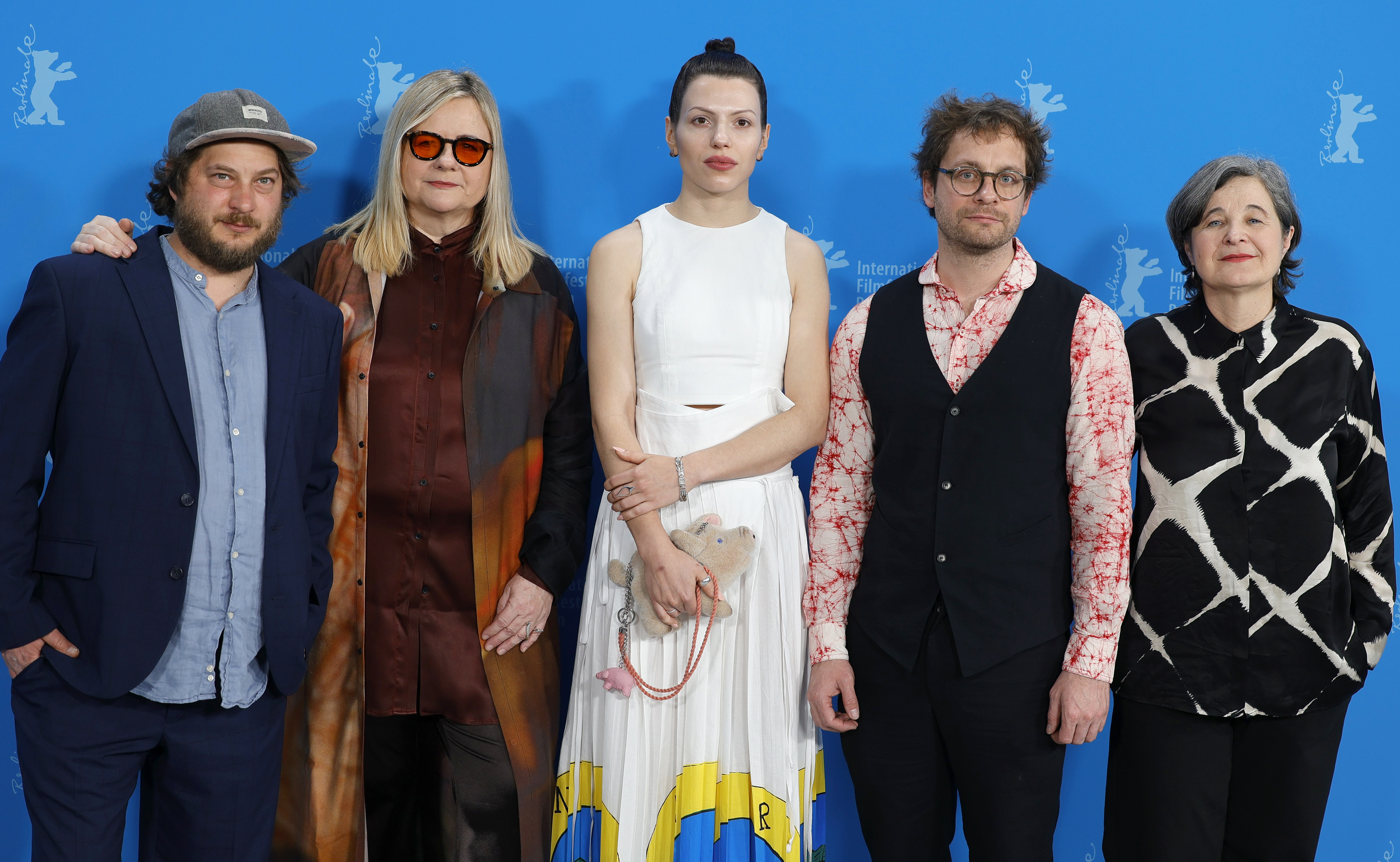
David Scheid, Veronika Franz, Anja Plaschg, Severin Fiala, and Maria Hofstätter at the film's Berlinale world premiere

The Devil's Bath had its world premiere on 20 February 2024, as part of the 74th Berlin International Film Festival, in Competition.

Filmladen is the film's distributor in Austria. The film was released theatrically on 8 March 2024 in Austria.

It was screened at the Festival of Austrian Films on 6 April 2024.

The film was submitted for the Best International Feature Film Award at the 2025 Academy Awards.

It competed in 2024 Stockholm International Film Festival and was screened on 7 November 2024. It will be featured at The 25th European Film Festival held in conjunction with 8th Malaysia International Film Festival and screened on 23 July 2025.

== Reception ==
On the review aggregator Rotten Tomatoes website, the film has an approval rating of 90% based on 58 reviews, with an average rating of 7.8/10. The critic consensus reads "A squirm-inducing period piece that locates true horror in both mind and spirit, The Devil's Bath might be Severin Fiala and Veronika Franz's most chilling directorial effort yet".

Jessica Kiang reviewing in Variety said, "If the story is so pitilessly bleak you may want to look away, the filmmaking craft is so compelling that you can't."

Susanne Gottlieb reviewing the film at Berlinale for Cineuropa wrote, "The Devil's Bath is a movie that will stick with the viewer for a while, as it's a drama drawing on the rich horror background of Franz and Fiala, while also emancipating itself from the genre they became famous for."

David Rooney reviewing the film for The Hollywood Reporter dubbed it as "Not horror but still plenty horrific," and opined, "While it's punishingly grim and has some pacing issues, this is a gripping psychological study by directors operating with formidable command."

Wendy Ide wrote in ScreenDaily while reviewing the film at Berlinale, "While the story is drawn from historical facts and is specific to its period, there are few films, contemporary or otherwise, that capture so unflinchingly the distorting, debilitating symptoms of depression as a disease."

Nicholas Bell in Ion Cinema rated the film with four stars and said, "Franz and Fiala have mounted a tragic condemnation, a film where the horrors are humans and their pernicious systems of control."

Jarod Neece, having viewed the film at the Tribeca Film Festival, stated, "The Devil's Bath is a haunting and visually stunning exploration of the human psyche." He also had praise for Anja Plaschg's performance, calling it "powerful and nuanced."

== Accolades ==
The film was selected in Competition at the 74th Berlin International Film Festival, thus it was nominated to compete for Golden Bear award.

In August 2024, it was selected for nomination to 37th European Film Awards to be held at Kultur- und Kongresszentrum Luzern in Lucerne on 7 December 2024.

The film was ranked 22nd among the top 25 European works of 2024 by the journalists at Cineuropa.

Award or film festival	Date	Category	Recipient	Result	Ref.
Berlin International Film Festival	25 February 2024	Golden Bear	Veronika Franz and Severin Fiala	Nominated	
Berlin International Film Festival	25 February 2024	Teddy Award for Best Feature Film	Veronika Franz and Severin Fiala	Nominated	
Berlin International Film Festival	25 February 2024	Silver Bear for Outstanding Artistic Contribution	Martin Gschlacht	Won	
Festival of Austrian Films	8 April 2024	Best Sound Design in a Fiction Film	Matz Müller, Tobias Fleig	Won	
Festival of Austrian Films	8 April 2024	Grand Diagonale Prize of the province of Styria – Feature Film	Veronika Franz and Severin Fiala	Nominated	
Austrian Film Awards	5 June 2024	Best Feature Film	The Devil's Bath	Won	
Austrian Film Awards	5 June 2024	Best Director	Veronika Franz and Severin Fiala	Nominated	
Austrian Film Awards	5 June 2024	Best Screenplay	Veronika Franz and Severin Fiala	Nominated	
Austrian Film Awards	5 June 2024	Best Actress	Anja Plaschg	Won	
Austrian Film Awards	5 June 2024	Best Supporting Actress	Maria Hofstätter	Won	
Austrian Film Awards	5 June 2024	Best Casting	Henri Steinmetz	Nominated	
Austrian Film Awards	5 June 2024	Best Cinematography	Martin Gschlacht	Nominated	
Austrian Film Awards	5 June 2024	Best Film Editing	Michael Palm	Won	
Austrian Film Awards	5 June 2024	Best Makeup	Judith Kröher and Tünde Kiss-Benke	Won	
Austrian Film Awards	5 June 2024	Best Production Design	Andreas Donhauser and Renate Martin	Won	
Austrian Film Awards	5 June 2024	Best Score	Anja Plaschg	Won	
Sitges Film Festival	13 October 2024	Best Feature Film	The Devil's Bath	Won	
Sitges Film Festival	13 October 2024	José Luis Guarner Critics' Award	The Devil's Bath	Won	
Sitges Film Festival	13 October 2024	Carnet Jove Jury Award	The Devil's Bath	Won	
Film Festival Cologne	24 October 2024	NRW Film Award	The Devil's Bath	Won	
European Film Awards	13 November 2024	European Costume Design	Tanja Hausner	Won	
Stockholm International Film Festival	17 November 2024	Best Cinematography	Martin Gschlacht	Won	
Camerimage	23 November 2024	Golden Frog for Best Cinematography	Martin Gschlacht	Nominated	
Camerimage	23 November 2024	FIPRESCI (International Federations of Film Critics) Award for Best Film	Martin Gschlacht	Won	

== See also ==
- List of submissions to the 97th Academy Awards for Best International Feature Film
- List of Austrian submissions for the Academy Award for Best International Feature Film
