= Stripper (film) =

- Theatrical release poster
- Directed by: Jerome Gary
- Written by: Charles Gaines
- Produced by: Geoff Bartz; Melvyn J. Estrin; Jerome Gary
- Cinematography: Edward Lachman
- Music by: Jack Nitzsche
- Production company: Embassy International Pictures
- Distributed by: 20th Century Fox
- Release date: January 31, 1986
- Running time: 90 minutes
- Country: United States
- Language: English
- Box office: US$90,000 (US and Canada)

Stripper is a 1986 American documentary film directed by Jerome Gary. After a deep dive into the hearts and minds of several dancers, it depicts a strippers convention and contest.

== Plot ==
The movie starts with a series of snapshots of what strippers looked like throughout history. Then, the movie shows how strippers view their job as an art performance, as the upcoming stripper convention held in the Sahara Hotel in Las Vegas called the Golden G-string Awards approaches.

The movie first focuses on the life of the competitor called Danyel from Vancouver who works as a veterinarian. The Vancouver exotic dancer association wants Danyel to represent Vancouver but conflict arises with the stripper shop owner who wants the strippers working for him to be in his shop rather than being at the convention. As she prepares her BDSM-themed performance for her upcoming competition, the film shows that she has a BDSM fetish. Second, the film focuses on the life of Sara, who is a dance instructor who views the profession of exotic dancers as dancers and a gateway to a successful dancing career.

Another pair of dancers, Mouse and Gio, goes on a long trip from Vancouver B.C to join the convention by riding a train. Mouse shares how she had an abusive father who abused her mom and how she was in different foster homes and an attention seeker. Gio shares her past life as a groupie and how her life has made her tough and how she is an exhibitionist. While discussing the other competitors, Mouse and Gio talk about the stripping scene in Vegas, which involves fancy costumes and animal tricks.

The film now changes its focus to a Vegas performer, Janette, who has a child out of wedlock because she was formerly scammed by a lover of hers and now worries about her future and that of her child, now that her profit diminishes in her profession post-pregnancy, and decides to be in the competition to get some money.

The movie now changes its focus to the people organizing the convention who want the convention to be an opportunity to unite strippers from all around thr world and improve standards for the exotic performers. As the competitors gather and the competition is proceeding it is revealed that the girls that were focused on in the previous sections were the finalists of the convention. However, it is revealed that Tarren wins the competition and the camera focuses on distraught competitors who failed to win the prize money. Despite being disappointed at the result, the competitors go back to their normal lives.
