= Goodnight Mommy =

2014 film directed by Veronika Franz and Severin Fiala

- Austrian film poster
- Directed by: Veronika Franz; Severin Fiala
- Written by: Veronika Franz; Severin Fiala
- Produced by: Ulrich Seidl
- Starring: Susanne Wuest; Elias Schwarz; Lukas Schwarz; Hans Escher; Elfriede Schatz; Karl Purker; Georg Deliovsky; Christian Steindl; Christian Schatz
- Cinematography: Martin Gschlacht
- Edited by: Michael Palm
- Music by: Olga Neuwirth
- Production company: Ulrich Seidl Film Produktion GmbH
- Distributed by: Stadtkino Verleih
- Release dates: 30 August 2014 (Venice); 8 January 2015 (Austria)
- Running time: 100 minutes
- Country: Austria
- Language: German
- Box office: $2.2 million

Goodnight Mommy (German: Ich seh, Ich seh, lit. 'I see, I see' (Note: In German, this is part of the phrase used for the game "I spy": Ich seh, Ich seh, was du nicht siehst, "I see, I see, what you do not see."); UK: Goodnight Mummy) is a 2014 Austrian psychological horror film, written and directed by Veronika Franz and Severin Fiala. The film stars Susanne Wuest and twin actors Elias and Lukas Schwarz, and follows the complex relationship between twin boys and their newly returned-from-the-hospital mother in a large isolated house. The boys begin to question the woman's identity, believing that she is not the same person as the one who went to surgery, and therefore wondering if she is their real mother.

Goodnight Mommy had its world premiere at the 71st Venice International Film Festival on 30 August 2014 and was theatrically released on 5 January 2015, by Stadtkino Verleih. The film grossed $2 million worldwide and received widespread acclaim from critics, with praise for its performances, direction and screenplay. It was selected as the Austrian entry for the Best Foreign Language Film at the 88th Academy Awards, but it was not nominated.

An American remake of the film starring Naomi Watts was released on Amazon Prime Video on 16 September 2022.

== Plot ==
After undergoing cosmetic facial surgery, a mother returns home to her modern, isolated lakeside house with her ten-year-old twin sons, Elias and Lukas. Her head is covered in bandages, with only her eyes and mouth visible. The twins are unnerved by their mother's appearance and are further taken aback when she begins to exhibit strange behavior. She pointedly ignores Lukas and appears to only acknowledge Elias in conversation. Though it is the middle of summer, the mother orders the twins to keep the blinds closed during the day, imposes a strict rule of silence inside the house, and only permits them to play outdoors. The mother also acts cruel and lashes out at Elias physically when he displays mischievous or disobedient acts, something the boys comment that their mother would never do.

The twins begin to suspect that the woman beneath the bandages is not their real mother. These doubts are confirmed when they find an old photograph of the mother with another unknown woman wearing identical clothes and bearing similar physical traits. Suspicious that the woman residing in their house is an impostor, the twins tie the woman to the bed and torture her to make her confess, sealing her mouth with tape to prevent her from screaming for help.

In the meantime, two employees of the Red Cross appear to collect donations. Although they initially await the return of the mother, they finally leave after Elias discreetly steals a large amount of cash from his mother's purse and offers it to them. Meanwhile, the woman removes the tape and calls for help, but is too late to attract the employees' attention. The twins seal her lips with super glue, but cut them back open with scissors when they realize she is unable to eat.

After she urinates in the bed, the twins briefly free the woman to let her use the restroom, allowing her to subdue them and escape. The twins, however, have set up a booby trap that knocks her unconscious. The woman awakens glued to the living room floor. Elias starts to set fire to the house to pressure her into telling them the truth, but she firmly insists that she is their real mother.

The mother then reveals that Lukas is dead, having died in an accident prior to the events of the movie; Elias has been hallucinating his presence. She tearfully insists to Elias that Lukas's death was not his fault and begs him to free her so they can both move on from the tragedy. Elias asks her what Lukas is doing, but she, unable to see the apparition of Lukas threatening to set fire to a curtain, cannot answer. Elias, believing his real mother would be able to see Lukas, grabs his arm and lights up the curtain. The mother burns to death before the firefighters arrive. The film ends with a ghostly shot of the mother reunited with her sons at a cornfield near their home.

== Cast ==
- Susanne Wuest as Mother
- Elias Schwarz as Elias
- Lukas Schwarz as Lukas
- Hans Escher as Priester
- Elfriede Schatz as Rotkreuz Sammlerin
- Karl Purker as Rotkreuz Sammler
- Georg Deliovsky as Pizzalieferant
- Christian Steindl as Mesner
- Christian Schatz as Bauer
- Erwin Schmalzbauer as Akkordeongott

== Reception ==
On the review aggregator website Rotten Tomatoes, 85% of 148 critics' reviews are positive, with an average rating of 7.70/10. The website's consensus reads: "Dark, violent, and drenched in dread, Goodnight Mommy is perfect for extreme horror enthusiasts—or filmgoers who prefer to watch between splayed fingers." On Metacritic, the film has a score of 81 out of 100, based on 19 critics, indicating "universal acclaim".

David Rooney of The Hollywood Reporter wrote, "this insidious tale of a mother-son bond gone haywire is squirm-inducing stuff. It has cult potential stamped all over it." Mark Kermode of The Observer gave the film 4/5 stars, calling it an "increasingly alarming chiller" and writing, "by the third act, you'll be hiding your face in wincing terror." The A.V. Club's A.A. Dowd gave it a B+ grade, saying it "plays on the nerves with expert cruelty—so much so, actually, that by the time the film belatedly comes clean about the plot secret everyone has already guessed, you're too pummeled into submission to care." Lenkia Cruz of The Atlantic said, "It’s a great watch for those who think modern horror films are all rubbish."

Peter Keough of The Boston Globe was more critical, writing, "There's enough here for several films, yet somehow it doesn't quite add up to one. Franz and Fiala are visionaries; all they need is a vision."

The National Board of Review named Goodnight Mommy one of the Top 5 Foreign Language Films of 2015.

== See also ==
- The Other, a psychological thriller with similar themes
- The Good Son, a psychological thriller with related themes
- A Tale of Two Sisters, a South Korean psychological horror-drama
- The Uninvited, American remake of A Tale of Two Sisters.
- List of submissions to the 88th Academy Awards for Best Foreign Language Film
- List of Austrian submissions for the Academy Award for Best Foreign Language Film
