= Survivor Song =

2020 horror novel by Paul Tremblay

- First edition
- Author: Paul G. Tremblay
- Audio read by: Erin Bennett
- Language: English
- Genre: Horror
- Set in: 21st-century Massachusetts
- Publisher: William Morrow (US); Titan Books (UK)
- Publication date: July 7, 2020 (US, UK)
- Publication place: United States
- Media type: Print (hardcover), ebook, audiobook
- Pages: 320 pp
- ISBN: 9780062679161 (hardcover 1st ed.)
- Preceded by: The Cabin at the End of the World

Survivor Song is a horror novel by American author Paul G. Tremblay, published by William Morrow on July 7, 2020. The narrative centers on characters striving to survive amidst a devastatingly infectious viral outbreak in Massachusetts.

The novel features characters Josh and Luis, who were first introduced in Tremblay's 2017 book Disappearance at Devil's Rock.

== Synopsis ==
The state of Massachusetts is under quarantine and curfew by the government due to proliferation of a new, highly infectious virus that resembles rabies in transmission and neurological effects. The virus causes aggressive behavior in infected individuals and spreads primarily through saliva and bite wounds. These government measures only serve as a stopgap, as hospitals are ill-equipped to handle the influx of virus victims alongside their regular patient load, overwhelming the clinics' capacity. Fear permeates society, and it is only a matter of time before the emergency protocols prove inadequate.

The novel follows Natalie, a pregnant woman, and her friend Ramola "Rams" Sherman, a pediatrician, as they navigate the chaos to reach a hospital and obtain the rabies vaccine; the stakes deepen because an infected neighbor bites Natalie while she's trying to defend her husband.

== Development ==
Tremblay began writing Survivor Song in 2018 and completed his final edits by fall 2019, prior to the COVID-19 pandemic. His inspiration for the book was to "take on a trope of horror, tweak it and ground it in reality." He has noted that he believes that "humanity's struggles with rabies through the centuries have led to most of the human monsters we've created in folklore and myth." While writing, Tremblay was initially concerned that some portions of the book would not seem realistic, specifically the conspiracy theories held by a group of right-wing militiamen. After the spread of COVID-19 and conspiracy theories surrounding the virus, he stated, "if anything, I probably should have given them more outlandish beliefs, based on some of the reactions to the coronavirus."

== Publication ==
Survivor Song was first released in the United States in hardcover and ebook format on July 7, 2020, through William Morrow. An audiobook adaptation, narrated by Erin Bennett, was released through HarperAudio. It was simultaneously published in the United Kingdom through Titan Books.

== Reception ==
Multiple reviewers have drawn comparisons between the rabies-esque virus in Survivor Song and the COVID-19 pandemic, with The New York Times and Tor.com stating that it was a timely read. Writing for The New York Times, Justin Cronin stated that, "City shutdowns, overrun hospitals, a bungled government response, public disorder, roving wing-nut militias, conspiracy theories — it's all here, right down to long lines at Star Market. Before this winter, the whole thing might've looked like escapist fancy. Now it looks like your Twitter feed." Jason Sheehan of NPR praised the book, stating that "Survivor Song is a small horror story. A personal one. A fast and terrible one that is committed beautifully to the page."
