= Knock at the Cabin =

2023 film by M. Night Shyamalan

- Theatrical release poster
- Directed by: M. Night Shyamalan
- Screenplay by: M. Night Shyamalan; Steve Desmond; Michael Sherman
- Based on: The Cabin at the End of the World by Paul G. Tremblay
- Produced by: M. Night Shyamalan; Marc Bienstock; Ashwin Rajan
- Starring: Dave Bautista; Jonathan Groff; Ben Aldridge; Nikki Amuka-Bird; Kristen Cui; Abby Quinn; Rupert Grint
- Cinematography: Jarin Blaschke; Lowell A. Meyer
- Edited by: Noemi Katharina Preiswerk
- Music by: Herdís Stefánsdóttir
- Production companies: Universal Pictures; Blinding Edge Pictures; FilmNation Entertainment; Wishmore Entertainment
- Distributed by: Universal Pictures
- Release dates: January 30, 2023 (Rose Hall); February 3, 2023 (United States)
- Running time: 100 minutes
- Country: United States
- Language: English
- Budget: $20 million
- Box office: $54.8 million

Knock at the Cabin is a 2023 American apocalyptic psychological horror film co-written, directed and produced by M. Night Shyamalan, who wrote the screenplay from an initial draft by Steve Desmond and Michael Sherman. It is based on the 2018 novel The Cabin at the End of the World by Paul G. Tremblay, the first adaptation of one of his works. The film stars Dave Bautista, Jonathan Groff, Ben Aldridge, Nikki Amuka-Bird, Kristen Cui, Abby Quinn, and Rupert Grint. In the film, a family is vacationing at a remote cabin when they are suddenly held hostage by four strangers who ask them to do something unimaginable.

Knock at the Cabin premiered in New York City at the Rose Hall on January 30, 2023, and was theatrically released in the United States on February 3, 2023, by Universal Pictures. The film received generally positive reviews from critics and grossed over $54 million worldwide.

== Plot ==
Seven-year-old Wen is vacationing with her parents, Eric and Andrew, in a remote cabin in rural Pennsylvania. She is approached by a stranger named Leonard who explains that he needs Wen and her parents' help to save the world. Leonard and three other individuals break into the cabin with makeshift weapons and tie Eric and Andrew up. Struggling to fight them off, Eric sustains a concussion.

Leonard and his companions, Sabrina, Adriane, and Redmond, claim that they have no intention of harming the family. However, in the past week they have been driven by visions to find the family. They foresee an impending apocalypse in which oceans will rise, a pandemic will spread, and the sky will fall. The only way to prevent this is for the family to sacrifice one of their own. If they fail to do so, they will be the last living humans. When the family refuses, the intruders sacrifice Redmond by fatally striking him with their weapons. Andrew sees a figure of light as Redmond dies. Television news reports show devastating megatsunamis. Andrew believes Redmond is really Rory O'Bannon, a man who had assaulted Andrew in a bar years prior, and thinks Rory tracked him down for revenge. Leonard, Sabrina, and Adriane grapple with guilt but reveal that Redmond's death has unleashed the first judgment of humanity.

The next day the intruders sacrifice Adriane. After this TV news reports a deadly variant of a flu virus tearing across the globe. Andrew uses a knife provided by Wen to escape his ropes, retrieves his handgun from the car, and shoots at Sabrina until she flees. As Leonard is being held at gunpoint, Sabrina charges in and is shot by Andrew. Leonard decapitates her. Andrew finds Redmond's wallet and shows Leonard that he was Rory. Andrew then confronts Leonard in the bathroom, but Leonard overpowers him and takes his gun. A TV broadcast reveals that hundreds of spontaneous plane crashes have occurred around the world.

Leonard informs the family that their time is nearly over, and after his own death they will only have a few minutes to make a decision. He then slashes his own throat. Upon his death, lightning causes fires and more planes crash out of the sky. Eric is convinced the intruders were correct and likens them to the Four Horsemen of the Apocalypse. Not wanting Wen to grow up in a destroyed world, he offers himself up as the sacrifice. He proceeds to envision an older Andrew and an adult Wen, both thriving in the future, and concludes that their family must have been chosen for the sacrifice for a reason. Andrew reluctantly shoots and kills Eric.

Andrew and Wen locate the intruders' truck in the woods near their cabin, where they find materials fully corroborating their stories. They drive off, making a stop at a crowded diner where they watch news reports confirming that the disasters have abruptly ended.

== Cast ==
- Dave Bautista as Leonard
- Jonathan Groff as Eric
- Ben Aldridge as Andrew
- Nikki Amuka-Bird as Sabrina
- Rupert Grint as Redmond
- Abby Quinn as Adriane
- Kristen Cui as Wen
- M. Night Shyamalan as an infomercial host

== Production ==
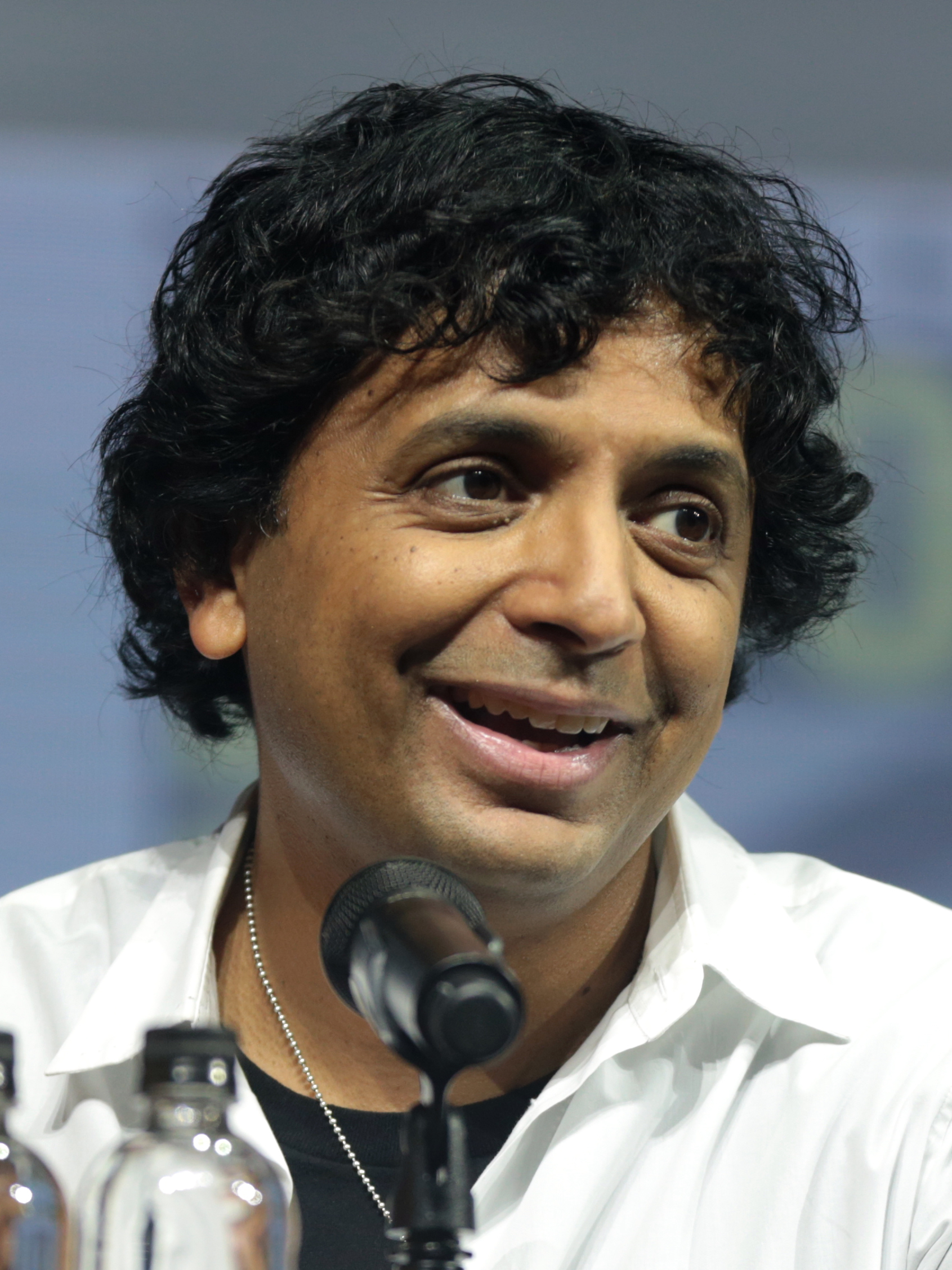
Writer, director, and producer M. Night Shyamalan

=== Development ===
Knock at the Cabin is an adaptation of the 2018 horror novel The Cabin at the End of the World by Paul Tremblay, who had signed an option with FilmNation Entertainment in late 2017, prior to the book's publication, and had to keep secret that the film was based on one of his novels until July 2022. The Black List and GLAAD List listed the initial draft by Steve Desmond and Michael Sherman as one of the most popular unproduced screenplays of 2019. While another director was briefly attached, M. Night Shyamalan read the original screenplay and grew interested in producing. Shyamalan later rewrote the script and came on board to direct the project as part of the two-film partnership between Universal Pictures and his production banner Blinding Edge Pictures. Old (2021) was the first film in that deal, with Knock at the Cabin being the second. The first draft was halfway completed by July 2021, and the title was revealed in October. Shyamalan said the script was the fastest he had ever written in his career.

=== Casting ===
Castings were announced from December 2021 to July 2022. They included Dave Bautista, Rupert Grint, Nikki Amuka-Bird, Ben Aldridge, Jonathan Groff, and Abby Quinn. Shyamalan cited Bautista's performance in Blade Runner 2049 (2017) as the reason he wanted him to star in Knock at the Cabin. Bautista increased his weight "in a short period of time" to 315 pounds for the role; in hindsight, he said he "over did it" and felt "uncomfortably big", which pushed him to lower his weight to 240 pounds, adding, "It took me forever to shed it off. And then I noticed the more I trimmed down, the better I felt."

=== Filming ===
Principal photography took place in Burlington County, New Jersey, from April 19 to June 10, 2022, with cinematographers Jarin Blaschke and Lowell A. Meyer. Shyamalan shot the film with lenses from the 1990s, to give it an "old-school thriller" look. During post-production, Herdís Stefánsdóttir composed the score. Shyamalan chose to change the ending of the film and make it different from the book so that it was not as dark and open-ended.

The film received an R-rating from the Motion Picture Association for "violence and language", making it Shyamalan's second film to receive that rating after The Happening (2008).

=== Music ===
In September 2022, it was announced that Herdís Stefánsdóttir would compose the musical score. The soundtrack was released through Back Lot Music on February 3, 2023.

== Release ==
Knock at the Cabin premiered in New York City at Rose Hall on January 30, 2023. The film was theatrically released on February 3, 2023, by Universal Pictures. The release was originally set for February 17 before being brought forward by two weeks as to avoid competition with Ant-Man and the Wasp: Quantumania.

This was the last film from Shyamalan to be released by Universal. After its release he signed a multi-year deal with Warner Bros. Pictures.

=== Home media ===
Knock at the Cabin was released for VOD on February 21, 2023, followed with a Blu-ray, DVD, and 4K UHD release by Universal Pictures Home Entertainment on May 9, 2023.

== Reception ==
=== Box office ===
Knock at the Cabin grossed $35.4 million in the United States and Canada, and $19.4 million in other territories, for a worldwide total of $54.8 million.

In the United States and Canada, the film was released alongside 80 for Brady, and was projected to gross $15–17 million from 3,643 theaters in its opening weekend. The film made $5.4 million on its first day, including $1.5 million from Thursday night previews. It went on to debut to $14.2 million, displacing Avatar: The Way of Water from atop the box office. The film made $5.5 million in its second weekend (a drop of 61%), finishing in sixth, and $3.9 million in its third weekend.

=== Critical response ===
On review aggregator Rotten Tomatoes, the film has an approval rating of 67% based on 344 reviews with an average rating of 6.3/10. The site's critical consensus reads, "Although it's often less than scary and parts of the story don't bear scrutiny, Knock at the Cabin is a thought-provoking chiller and upper-tier Shyamalan." Metacritic, which uses a weighted average, assigned the film a score of 63 out of 100, based on 60 critics, indicating "generally favorable" reviews. Audiences polled by CinemaScore gave the film an average grade of "C" on an A+ to F scale, while those polled by PostTrak gave it a 56% positive score, with 35% saying they would definitely recommend it.

Ready Steady Cut film critic M.N. Miller embraced the movie's faults by saying, "This is an exceptionally made thriller with satisfying flaws to pick at and debate." Reviewing for RogerEbert.com, Nick Allen gave the film two out of four stars, commending the "rich and earthy" cinematography and Bautista's "disarming" performance but ultimately finding the film "frustrating and self-serious", adding "M. Night Shyamalan should probably just stay away from the apocalypse." Charlotte O'Sullivan of the Evening Standard found "many plot holes" in the film, adding, "The deeper issue, though, is that the supposedly complex home-invaders aren't given enough space to become interesting." Wendy Ide for The Observer wrote, "As the film's bleak momentum builds, so does a tsunami swell of existential dread. It's Shyamalan's most contained and efficient picture in a while." Stef Rubino for Autostraddle felt that "Like all of Shyamalan's greatest features, what unfolds throughout the course of the film is a family drama but on the grandest of scales." Writing for Slate, Sam Adams criticized Shyamalan's changes to the ending and filmmaking choices that gloss over the horrific violence of the story.

=== Accolades ===
Knock at the Cabin was nominated for Best Horror at the 6th Hollywood Critics Association Midseason Film Awards.
