= Paul Tremblay =

American author and editor (born 1971)

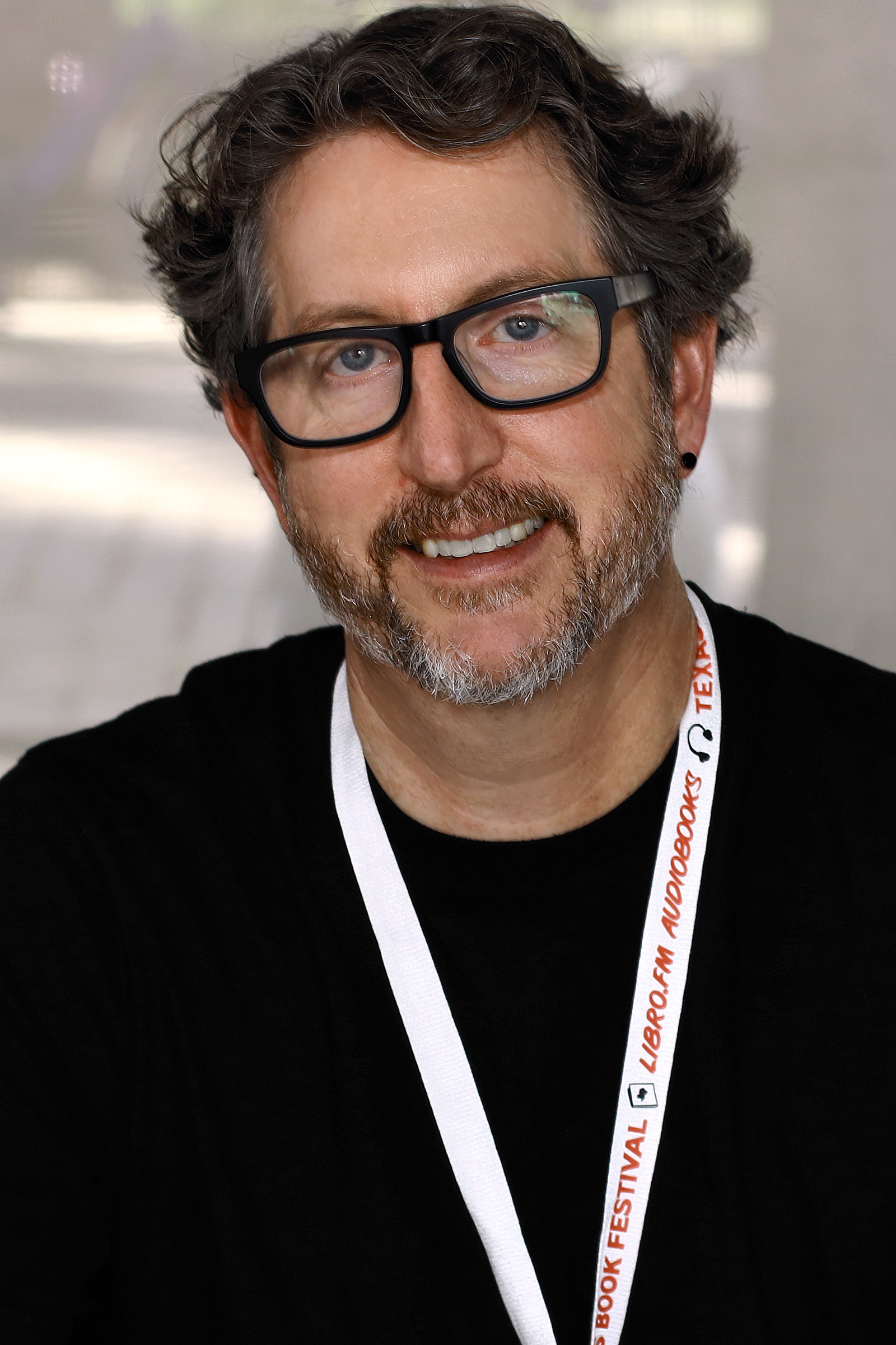
- Tremblay at the 2024 Texas Book Festival.
- Born: June 30, 1971 (age 55); Aurora, Colorado, U.S.
- Occupations: Author; editor
- Children: 2
- Writing career
- Period: 2000–present
- Genres: Horror fiction, science fiction, dark fantasy, New Weird, weird fiction
- Notable works: A Head Full of Ghosts; The Cabin at the End of the World
- Literary movement: Postmodernism
- Website: paultremblay.net

Paul Gaetan Tremblay (born June 30, 1971) is an American author and editor of horror, dark fantasy, and science fiction. His most widely known novels include A Head Full of Ghosts, The Cabin at the End of the World, and Survivor Song. He has won multiple Bram Stoker Awards and been a juror for the Shirley Jackson Awards.

== Early life and education ==
Tremblay was born in Aurora, Colorado, and raised in Massachusetts. He had spinal fusion surgery to treat scoliosis before he went to college. He attended Providence College in Rhode Island, receiving his bachelor's degree in 1993. He obtained his master's degree in mathematics from the University of Vermont in 1995.

In summers between college, Tremblay worked at the Parker Brothers factory in Salem, Massachusetts, primarily in the warehouse and assembly lines. After graduation, he began teaching high school mathematics and coaching junior varsity basketball at Saint Sebastian's School.

== Career ==
Tremblay's novel The Little Sleep was published by Henry Holt and Company in 2009, and its follow-up No Sleep Till Wonderland in 2010. Swallowing a Donkey's Eye was published by ChiZine Publications in 2012.

Tremblay collaborated with Stephen Graham Jones to write the young adult novel Floating Boy and the Girl Who Couldn't Fly. The novel was published in 2014 under the pseudonym P.T. Jones.

Tremblay's novel A Head Full of Ghosts was published on June 2, 2015, by William Morrow and Company and won the Horror Writers Association's 2015 Bram Stoker Award for Best Novel. In 2015, Focus Features optioned the novel. In 2024, Veronika Franz and Severin Fiala were announced to direct the film adapation. In 2026, Lionsgate Films acquired the distribution rights with production set to begin in March of that year.

Disappearance at Devil's Rock was published in 2016 and received the 2017 British Fantasy Award for Best Horror Novel.

The Cabin at the End of the World was published on June 26, 2018. It won the Locus Award for Best Horror Novel. FilmNation acquired the rights to The Cabin at the End of the World in April 2018, before its publication. The novel was adapted into the 2023 film Knock at the Cabin, directed by M. Night Shyamalan.

His collection Growing Things and Other Stories was published in 2019 by William Morrow and Company and won the 2019 Bram Stoker Award for Best Fiction Collection.

Survivor Song was published on July 7, 2020, and The Pallbearers Club was published in 2022. The Beast You Are, a collection of fifteen short stories, was published in July 2023. His dystopian horror novel Dead but Dreaming of Electric Sheep was released in June 2026.

== Bibliography ==
=== Novels ===
- The Little Sleep (2009) (Henry Holt and Company)
- No Sleep Till Wonderland (2010) (Henry Holt and Company)
- Swallowing a Donkey's Eye (2012) (ChiZine Publications)
- Floating Boy and the Girl Who Couldn't Fly (2014) (with Stephen Graham Jones under the pseudonym P.T. Jones) (ChiTeen)
- A Head Full of Ghosts (2015) (William Morrow and Company)
- Disappearance at Devil's Rock (2016) (William Morrow and Company)
- The Cabin at the End of the World (2018) (William Morrow and Company)
- Survivor Song (2020) (William Morrow and Company)
- The Pallbearers Club (2022) (William Morrow and Company)
- Horror Movie (2024) (William Morrow and Company)
- Another (2025) (Quill Tree Books)
- Dead but Dreaming of Electric Sheep (2026) (HarperCollins)

=== Collections ===
- Compositions for the Young and Old (2004) (Wildside Press)
- City Pier: Above and Below (2007) (Prime Books)
- In the Mean Time (2010) (ChiZine Publications)
- Growing Things and Other Stories (2019) (William Morrow and Company)
- The Beast You Are: Stories (2023) (William Morrow and Company)

=== Anthologies ===
- Bandersnatch (2007) (with Sean Wallace) (Wildside Press)
- Phantom (2009) (co-edited with Sean Wallace) (Prime Books)
- Creatures: Thirty Years of Monsters (2011) (co-edited with John Langan) (Prime Books)

=== Short fiction ===
- "Hurt" (2001)
- "Them Bones" (2001)
- "The Wizard's Imp" (2001)
- "A Monster on Yur Parasol" (2003)
- "The Dilky Never Landed" (2004)
- "All Sliding to One Side" (2004)
- "Holes" (2006)
- "The Fate of Poor Jack Haringa" (2008)
- "The Harlequin & the Train?" (2009) (novella-length expansion of the 2003 short story)
- "Our Stories Will Live Forever" (2012)
- "The Dead Boy" (2014)
- "Scenes from the City of Garbage and the City of Clay" (2015)
- "Shattered" (2016)
- "Excerpt from A Head Full of Ghosts" (2017)
- "These Are Our Town's Monsters" (2018)
- "If Willow Believed in Any Kind of Ghosts" (2023)
- "In Bloom" (2023)

== Awards ==
Work	Year & Award	Category	Result	Ref.
The Teacher	2007 Bram Stoker Award	Short Fiction	Nominated	
There's No Light Between Floor	2007 Bram Stoker Award	Short Fiction	Nominated	
"The Blog at the End of the World"	2008 Black Quill Awards	Best Dark Scribble (Editors' Choice)	Won	
The Little Sleep	2009 Bram Stoker Award	First Novel	Nominated	
"The Harlequin and the Train"	2009 Black Quill Awards	Small Press Chill	Nominated	
In the Mean Time	2010 Black Quill Awards	Dark Genre Fiction Collection	Nominated	
A Head Full of Ghosts	2015 Goodreads Choice Awards	Horror	Nominated	
A Head Full of Ghosts	2015 Bram Stoker Award	Novel	Won	
A Head Full of Ghosts	2016 RUSA CODES Reading List	Horror	Shortlisted	
A Head Full of Ghosts	2016 World Fantasy Award	Novel	Nominated	
Disappearance at Devil's Rock	2016 Dragon Awards	Horror	Nominated	
Disappearance at Devil's Rock	2016 Goodreads Choice Awards	Horror	Nominated	
Disappearance at Devil's Rock	2016 Bram Stoker Award	Novel	Nominated	
Disappearance at Devil's Rock	2017 British Fantasy Award	August Derleth Award	Won	
Disappearance at Devil's Rock	2017 Locus Award	Horror Novel	Nominated	
The Cabin at the End of the World	2018 Dragon Awards	Horror	Nominated	
The Cabin at the End of the World	2018 Goodreads Choice Awards	Horror	Nominated	
The Cabin at the End of the World	2018 Bram Stoker Award	Novel	Won	
The Cabin at the End of the World	2019 RUSA CODES Reading List	Horror	Shortlisted	
The Cabin at the End of the World	2019 British Fantasy Award	August Derleth Award	Nominated	
The Cabin at the End of the World	2019 Locus Award	Horror Novel	Won	
Growing Things and Other Stories	2019 Goodreads Choice Awards	Horror	Nominated	
Growing Things and Other Stories	2019 Bram Stoker Award	Fiction Collection	Won	
Growing Things and Other Stories	2020 British Fantasy Award	Collection	Nominated	
Growing Things and Other Stories	2020 Locus Award	Collection	Nominated	
Survivor Song	2020 Goodreads Choice Awards	Horror	Nominated	
Survivor Song	2021 Dragon Awards	Horror Novel	Nominated	
Survivor Song	2021 Locus Award	Horror Novel	Nominated	
Survivor Song	2021 British Fantasy Award	August Derleth Award	Nominated	
Ice Cold Lemonade 25ȼ Haunted House Tour: 1 Per Person	2020 Locus Award	Novelette	Nominated	
The Pallbearers Club	2023 Dragon Awards	Horror Novel	Nominated	
The Pallbearers Club	2023 Locus Award	Horror Novel	Nominated	
Horror Movie	2025 Locus Award	Horror Novel	Nominated	
Horror Movie	2024 Bram Stoker Award	Novel	Nominated	
