= Veronika Franz and Severin Fiala =

Austrian filmmaking duo

Veronika Franz
- Born: 1965 (age 60–61); Vienna, Austria
- Occupations: Director; screenwriter; journalist
- Years active: 1997–present
- Known for: Goodnight Mommy

Severin Fiala
- Born: 1985 (age 40–41); Horn, Austria
- Occupations: Director; screenwriter
- Years active: 2009–present
- Known for: Goodnight Mommy

Veronika Franz (born 1965) and Severin Fiala (born 1985) are an Austrian filmmaking duo. Franz is a long time partner and Fiala the nephew of filmmaker Ulrich Seidl. Franz, a former film journalist, began her film career co-writing with Seidl. Franz and Fiala began their creative partnership writing and directing Kern (2012), a documentary about the actor Peter Kern. They went on to gain international notice for their feature debut, the German-language psychological horror film Goodnight Mommy (2014), which was selected as the Austrian entry for the Best Foreign Language Film at the 88th Academy Awards.

== Early lives ==
Veronika Franz was born in 1965 in Vienna, Austria. Prior to establishing a career as a filmmaker, she worked as a film journalist for the German-language newspaper Kurier, beginning in 1997. She subsequently co-wrote several screenplays and since 2003 also co-produced with long time partner filmmaker Ulrich Seidl, including all three features in his Paradise trilogy; she also worked as an assistant director on some projects.

Severin Fiala was born in 1985 in Horn, Austria, and formally studied at a film school. Fiala is Seidl's biological nephew, and Franz became more closely acquainted with Fiala when she and Seidl hired him to regularly babysit their two sons. Franz and Fiala found they had a mutual love of horror films.

== Career ==
While attending a film festival, Franz met Austrian actor Peter Kern, a controversial actor and filmmaker. Recalling their meeting, Franz said: "[I talked to him] for several days actually. I only talked to him because I felt so sorry for him, but I got to know him. I really thought that he was a very fascinating character and someone should do a movie about him. He used to work with Rainer Werner Fassbinder in the German cinema of the ‘70s. He was kind of erschwerte in that group. I mean, he was crazy. I thought he was really crazy." Franz decided to follow Kern for the next two years, directing and writing a documentary film on him with Fiala. The documentary, titled Kern, was released in 2012.

In 2013, Franz and Fiala began working on their feature debut, Goodnight Mommy, a horror film about twin boys who suspect their mother, having recently undergone cosmetic surgery, is somebody else. Goodnight Mommy, co-written and co-directed by Franz and Fiala, was selected as the Austrian entry for the Best Foreign Language Film at the 88th Academy Awards, but it was not nominated.

Franz and Fiala subsequently co-wrote and co-directed a segment in the anthology horror film The Field Guide to Evil (2018), titled Die Trud. In 2019, the duo directed (and co-wrote, with Sergio Casci) their English-language film debut, the psychological horror film The Lodge, which premiered at the 2019 Sundance Film Festival before being released in the United States on 7 February 2020. Their latest collaboration is the drama The Devil's Bath which premiered in Competition at the 74th Berlin International Film Festival in February 2024, where it received the Silver Bear for Outstanding Artistic Contribution for Martin Gschlacht's cinematography.

In February 2024, Franz and Fiala were announced as writers and directors of a film adaptation of A Head Full of Ghosts.

== Filmography ==
Year	Title	Directors	Writers	Notes	Ref.
2012	Kern	Yes	Yes	Documentary film	
2014	Goodnight Mommy	Yes	Yes		
2018	The Field Guide to Evil	Yes	Yes	Segment: "Die Trud"	
2019	The Lodge	Yes	Yes	Co-written with Sergio Casci	
2024	The Devil's Bath	Yes	Yes		
TBA	A Head Full of Ghosts	Yes	Yes	Filming	
