= A Head Full of Ghosts =

2015 horror novel by Paul G. Tremblay

- Author: Paul G. Tremblay
- Cover artist: Amanda Kain
- Language: English
- Genre: Horror
- Set in: Beverly, Massachusetts
- Published: 2015 (HarperCollins)
- Pages: 304
- Awards: Bram Stoker Award for Novel
- ISBN: 978-0-06-236323-7

A Head Full of Ghosts is a 2015 horror novel by American writer Paul Tremblay. The plot involves a Massachusetts family under financial and emotional strain while their fourteen-year-old daughter, Marjorie Barrett, exhibits signs of severe mental illness. The Barretts come to believe she is possessed by a demon, and her behavior is publicized when the family stars in a reality TV show. Marjorie's younger sister, Merry Barrett, relays the experiences of her childhood fifteen years later. Themes include elements of Catholic exorcism and reality television exploitation.

Tremblay dedicated the novel to Shirley Jackson. A Head Full of Ghosts has been noted to have plot and thematic similarities to Jackson's We Have Always Lived In The Castle. Merry Barrett's name is also similar to that of Merricat Blackwood.

The novel was published on June 2, 2015 by William Morrow and won the Horror Writers Association's Bram Stoker Award for Novel in 2015. Focus Features has acquired the rights to develop a movie adaptation.

== Synopsis ==
23-year-old Meredith "Merry" Barrett recalls the horrific events surrounding her sister Marjorie, which were publicized by her family being featured on The Possession, a sensational reality TV show, fifteen years ago. Merry is interviewed by author Rachel Neville for a tell-all book separating the truth from the edited show and urban legends, though Merry admits her memories may be warped by time and others' stories. In blog posts, Karen Brissette reviews and deconstructs The Possession and its reception.

As a precocious 8-year-old, Merry adores her 14-year-old sister Marjorie and is largely unaware of the strain on her family. Her unemployed father, John, has become a born-again Catholic, causing tension with his wife Sarah. Marjorie has been acting bizarrely, blurring the lines between schizophrenia and demonic possession, with psychiatric treatment seeming ineffective. Marjorie begins telling Merry strange, macabre stories and sneaking into her room at night. She behaves erratically, says she hears voices, has violent outbursts and night terrors and privately threatens to hurt her younger sister. John pushes to abandon medical treatment and enlist the help of his church's priest, Father Wanderly, and comes to believe Marjorie is possessed by a demon.

Due to the family's precarious finances, Sarah agrees to have Marjorie be the focus of The Possession, which will follow Marjorie's "possession" and eventual exorcism. After filming reenactments of Marjorie's behavior, a TV crew moves into the Barrett home to document their lives. Marjorie tells Merry she has been faking her possession in order to help the family financially with the show. While Merry is uncertain of the truth, she lies and exaggerates for the show. The family are ostracized by their community, and Sarah comes to disagree with John and Father Wanderly's increasingly cruel behavior toward Marjorie. John grows more volatile, violent and religiously extreme; Marjorie tells Merry he may be the one who is possessed.

For the final episode of The Possession, Marjorie is tied to her bed while Father Wanderly performs an exorcism and her family witnesses. After Marjorie begs to be let go, she bites a priest, escapes her bonds and threatens that everyone will die. Merry, overwhelmed, yells at Marjorie to stop faking, then flees. In the show's final scene, Marjorie jumps off the stair railing to follow Merry and appears to float. It is revealed that Karen is a pseudonym Merry writes under, and that John poisoned the family and himself a month after the show ended, with only Merry surviving.

Merry recalls that Marjorie was injured after her jump, a possible suicide attempt, and John felt abandoned by the church after the failed exorcism. Rachel has uncovered emails between John and an extremist Baptist pastor who seemingly encouraged John to kill his family. Finally, Merry recalls the day her family died. Marjorie shows Merry dozens of news stories about familicide committed by fathers who, like John, felt disempowered and abandoned by society. She claims her behavior has been an attempt to draw attention to John's mental issues, but now he is ready to kill the family with Sarah's help. Marjorie produces a jar of potassium cyanide which she says she stole from John. She instructs Merry to put the poison in a pot of spaghetti sauce, which will knock their parents out and allow the sisters to flee. Merry does so, but at dinner Marjorie eats the sauce instead of refusing, like Merry. Merry is angry that Marjorie has lied again, before her family dies.

Merry tells Rachel she remembers being found by her aunt after three days, though the police report says she was found among her family's corpses at the dinner table. While Rachel is moved by the confession, she points out that the only fingerprint found on the poison jar was John's, and questions what the truth is. Merry insists she was manipulated into killing her family by her mentally ill sister, the whole family was hurt by the show, and she is ready for her truth to be known.

== Major characters ==
Meredith "Merry" Barrett is the narrator and protagonist of the novel. As a child, she has an overactive imagination, and enjoys playing in her room rather than with other kids. She admires her older sister, Marjorie, and would do anything to please her. As an adult, Merry struggles with her infamy she gained in childhood and the mockery she faced following the conclusion of The Possession. In both adulthood and childhood Merry is an unreliable narrator, openly admitting that she doesn't clearly remember her past and that she lied as a child.

Marjorie Barrett is Merry's fourteen year old sister. Prior to the start of the novel she begins seeing a therapist regarding her frequent violent outbursts and lack of motivation at school. Prior to these outbursts she is described as a very conscientious and kind sister who often tells her made-up stories based on characters from Richard Scarry's Cars and Trucks and Things That Go. Over time she acts manipulative towards Merry. Despite her age she is incredibly intelligent. After she begins seeing her therapist, her family becomes convinced that she is possessed, and she becomes the focus of a documentary series called The Possession.

John Barrett is the father of Merry and Marjorie. Prior to the start of the novel he loses his job and struggles with no longer being the main breadwinner of the family. After turning to the Catholic Church for guidance, he becomes increasingly paranoid and is convinced that Marjorie is not mentally ill, but instead has been possessed. He is prone to yelling when angry and wishes his family, particularly his children, would share his Catholic faith.

Sarah Barrett is the mother of Merry and Marjorie. She is the sole breadwinner of the family and does not share her husband's faith. After The Possession begins airing, she disagrees with how cruelly Marjorie is treated by those who believe she is possessed, and is concerned by how Merry is being affected. She increasingly regrets letting Marjorie be put on display and is ashamed of her role in the show.

Karen Brissette is the writer of an online blog called "The Last Final Girl" that focuses on horror media. Posts dedicated to analyzing The Possession appear at the start of every section of the novel. Karen professes to have watched The Possession hundreds of times. Karen draws parallels to what happens in the documentary show and other pieces of horror fiction, such as The Blair Witch Project, and notes when the show has been edited to fit certain narratives and perspectives. Karen criticizes how Marjorie was sexualized in the reenactments and dehumanized while she suffered, and how the show's narrative centered on John's plight. (It is revealed late in the novel that Karen is actually Meredith Barrett writing under a pseudonym.)

== Background ==
While conducting research for another novel, Tremblay read a series of essays exploring the themes behind William Peter Blatty's novel The Exorcist, one of the most famous fiction novels regarding demonic possession. Noting that while other horror cliches that were popular in the late twentieth century had remerged in popular literature, he wrote A Head Full Of Ghosts in response to the lack of recent novels regarding possession.

== Reception ==
A Head Full of Ghosts won the Horror Writers Association's Bram Stoker Award for Novel in 2015.

The novel was also praised for being self-referential and comedic without parodying the horror genre.

The novel was praised by Stephen King, who claimed that it "scared the living hell out of [him]".

== Film adaptation ==
In May 2015, a bidding war for the film rights began just before the book was published, with Focus Features emerging as the victor to develop a movie adaptation. Robert Downey Jr. and Daniel Dubiecki signed on as producers with Ben Collins and Luke Piotrowski writing the script. In February 2018, it was announced that Oz Perkins, the director of the horror 2016 film I Am the Pretty Thing That Lives in the House, would be rewriting and directing the film adaptation of A Head Full Of Ghosts. In February 2020, Scott Cooper was brought on as the new director in addition to providing his own revisions, and Margaret Qualley signed on to star. Cross Creek Pictures also joined as a financier. The following month, it was reported that STXfilms was to acquire the film to distribute in the US and UK. In February 2024, Veronika Franz and Severin Fiala were announced to write and direct the film, with Fifth Season financing instead of STX. In February 2026, Lionsgate purchased worldwide distribution rights with a new cast of David Harbour, Rebecca Hall and Esmé Creed-Miles. Filming is set to begin in March.
