= In the Basement (film) =

- Directed by: Ulrich Seidl
- Release date: August 29, 2014 (Venice)
- Running time: 82 minutes
- Country: Austria
- Language: German

In the Basement (Im Keller) is a 2014 Austrian documentary film directed by Ulrich Seidl about people and their obsessions, and what they do in their basements in their free time. It was part of the Out of Competition section at the 71st Venice International Film Festival.

== Critical reception ==
Glass Magazine called the film "unflinching and unsettling" in its review. Guy Lodge wrote "this is an arm's-length exercise in observation, even in scenes of discomfiting intimacy" in his review for Variety.
