= Import/Export =

- Directed by: Ulrich Seidl
- Produced by: Ulrich Seidl
- Starring: Ekateryna Rak; Paul Hofmann; Michael Thomas; Natalja Baranova; Natalja Epuraneu
- Release date: November 9, 2007
- Running time: 141 minutes
- Country: Austria
- Languages: German; Russian; Slovak

Import/Export is an Austrian drama film by the director Ulrich Seidl from 2007. It was nominated for the Palme d'Or at the 2007 Cannes Film Festival and won the Grand Prix - Golden Apricot reward at the Yerevan International Film Festival. The film was shot in Vienna, Ukraine, Romania, the Czech Republic, and Slovakia from 2005 until May 2007 on 16mm film. Simultaneously, the film follows a nurse from Ukraine searching for a better life in the West and an unemployed security guard from Austria heading East for the same reason.

== Plot ==
Olga is a Ukrainian woman from Eastern Ukraine, who lives with her mother and has a child. Her job as a nurse does not pay well enough for her to support herself and her baby, and she gets a second job doing internet pornography. She eventually leaves her homeland and travels to Vienna, Austria, where she finds a job as a housekeeper at a rich family's home, where she also lives. The woman of the family suspects her of stealing and fires her. She is then employed as a cleaner at a geriatric hospital. She develops a relationship with an elderly man named Erich and he asks her to marry him. She accepts as she knows this will gain her Austrian citizenship. However, Erich dies of a heart attack before they can marry.

Pauli is a young man from Vienna, Austria who lives with his mother and stepfather. He owns a large dog named Caeser and trains in martial arts. He works as a security guard at a shopping complex but is sacked after a gang of drunken Turks cuff him with his handcuffs and strip him of his clothes. His girlfriend breaks up with him as she is afraid of his dog, and he owes money to a number of people including his stepfather, Michael. Michael then takes him along on a job in Ukraine setting up video gambling machines. On the way there, they stop at an impoverished Romani neighbourhood in Košice, Slovakia, where Pauli tries to 'hire' a prostitute. He fails to agree on a price with the Romani pimps, and they chase him back to his van. When they arrive in Uzhhorod, Ukraine, they rent a hotel room and try to pick up girls at a bar. When Pauli goes back to his room to borrow money from Michael to pay his tab, he finds that Michael has a prostitute. Michael insists Pauli watches him humiliate the prostitute before he can leave. The next day, Pauli leaves Michael's company and searches for work at a local market, where he fails to find any. The last we see of him is when he is walking along a long country road, hitchhiking, either back to the West or further into Ukraine.

== Cast ==
- Ekateryna Rak: Olga
- Paul Hofmann: Pauli
- Michael Thomas: Michael, Pauli's stepfather
- Natalja Baranova: Olga's friend (Ukraine)
- Natalja Epuraneu: Olga's friend (Vienna)
- Maria Hofstätter: Sister Maria
- Georg Friedrich: Orderly Andi
- Erich Finches: Erich Schlager
- Dirk Stermann: Assessment trainer

== Reception ==
The film received favourable reviews from critics, on Rotten Tomatoes the film has an acceptance score of 84% with an average rating of 6.90/10 based on 32 reviews, with the critical consensus “A grim and disturbing vision from Ulrich Seidl, makes for an uncomfortable and uncompromising picture of life, that is anything but comfy and pedestrian.”
