= Paradise trilogy =

Paradise
- DVD cover
- Directed by: Ulrich Seidl
- Written by: Ulrich Seidl; Veronika Franz
- Produced by: Ulrich Seidl
- Cinematography: Wolfgang Thaler; Ed Lachman
- Edited by: Christof Schertenleib
- Production company: Ulrich Seidl Film
- Country: Austria
- Language: German

Paradise (German: Paradies) is the collective name of three films directed by Ulrich Seidl: Paradise: Love (2012), Paradise: Faith (2012) and Paradise: Hope (2013). They focus on three women from one family; one of them travels to Kenya as a sex tourist, one has to spend time at a weight loss camp, and one tries to propagate Catholicism. The project is an Austrian majority production with co-producers in Germany and France. It was conceived as one feature film, but after a long gestation became three entries forming a trilogy. The first installment, Paradise: Love, competed for the Palme d'Or at the 2012 Cannes Film Festival. Seidl originally planned to premiere all three films at the same event, but after the Cannes selection decided to roll out parts two and three, Paradise: Faith and Paradise: Hope, at other major film festivals. The individual films are named after the three theological virtues, and focus on how the protagonists conceive their view of paradise.

== Cast ==
- Maria Hofstätter as Anna Maria
- Nabil Saleh as Nabil
- Margarete Tiesel as Teresa
- Inge Maux as Teresa's friend
- Gabriel Mwarua
- Peter Kazungu
- Carlos Mkutano

== Production ==
The project was conceived as one 130-minute feature film. The majority producer of the film was the director's Austrian company Ulrich Seidl Film, with Germany's Tat Film and France's Société Parisienne as co-producers. Further co-production support came from the broadcasters ORF, Arte and Degeto. The project received funding from Österreichisches Filminstitut, Filmfonds Wien, Land Niederösterreich, Eurimages, the French National Center of Cinematography and Medien- und Filmgesellschaft Baden-Württemberg. Filming took place between 22 October 2009 and 14 September 2010 in Kenya and Vienna.

== Themes ==
The director summarized the theme of the trilogy as follows:

All three women fall in love, experience love and, along the way, disappointment. For the daughter at the diet camp (where overweight teens spend their vacations), this is the first love of her life, with all its absolutes. For her mother, who travels to Kenya to find love - or sex – it‘s a conscious choice after years of being disappointed. And her sister, who loves no one but Jesus, and who has thus found a spiritual, wholly cerebral sexual love, goes even further: What you can‘t find on earth, you long for in heaven, the promised paradise.
