= Paradise: Faith =

2012 film

- Film poster
- Directed by: Ulrich Seidl
- Written by: Ulrich Seidl; Veronika Franz
- Starring: Maria Hofstätter
- Release date: 30 August 2012 (Venice)
- Running time: 113 minutes
- Country: Austria
- Language: German

Paradise: Faith (German: Paradies: Glaube) is a 2012 Austrian drama film directed by Ulrich Seidl, the second in his Paradise trilogy. The film was nominated for the Golden Lion at the 69th Venice International Film Festival and won the Special Jury Prize. It won the award for best sound design at the 26th European Film Awards.

The film has been named as a favourite of director John Waters, who presented the film as his annual pick within the 2013 Maryland Film Festival.

== Plot ==
Anna Maria (Maria Hofstätter) is a middle-aged Austrian woman who lives alone in a well-knitted house in Vienna. When she doesn't work in the hospital, she cleans her house thoroughly. But she doesn't feel alone; she has Jesus; she loves Jesus. This unconditional love of God empowers her to overcome the temptations of her flesh, by praying and by methodically using all sorts of self-punishments.

But she is not alone in her quest; she is a member of a small ultra-religious group which tries to bring the Catholic faith back to Austria; when she takes a break from her work instead of going on vacations, she tries door to door to bring God to poor neighborhoods which are occupied mostly by immigrants.

Although her faith is strong, it will be challenged not only by the various reactions of the people that she tries to approach, but also back home, where her past vividly returns. Her crippled Muslim husband returns and demands a share of her love, which she offers gladly only to Jesus.

== Cast ==
- Maria Hofstätter as Anna Maria
- Nabil Saleh as Nabil
- Natalya Baranova as Natalya
- Rene Rupnik as Herr Rupnik
