= Disappearance at Devil's Rock =

2016 horror novel by Paul Tremblay

- Author: Paul G. Tremblay
- Language: English
- Genre: Horror
- Published: 2016
- Publisher: William Morrow
- Awards: 2017 British Fantasy Award for Best Horror Novel

Disappearance at Devil's Rock is a horror novel by American writer Paul G. Tremblay. The novel received the 2017 British Fantasy Award for Best Horror Novel (August Derleth Award). It was nominated for the Horror Writers Association's Bram Stoker Award for Best Novel in 2017.

== Plot ==
A thirteen-year-old boy named Tommy Sanderson goes missing after spending time with his friends, Josh Griffin and Luis Fernandez, at Borderland State Park in Massachusetts. His mother Elizabeth, younger sister Kate, and grandmother are thrown into disarray as strange events begin occurring; a mysterious apparition appears in his mother's room and discarded pages from his journal that may provide potential clues as to his whereabouts begin to surface.

The investigation, led by Allison Murtaugh, slowly reveals some of the strange events leading up to the disappearance. At the center of it all is a man named Rooney Flannery, who moonlights as a man named Arnold. Arnold claims to be a "seer" and ends up giving all three boys a harrowing backstory of satanic activity at Split Rock. This backstory may or may not connect to Tommy's disappearance.

== Reception ==
Jason Heller of NPR wrote that the novel "takes the simple premise of a lost child and twists it into a dizzying emotional vortex" and that "the most powerful aspect of Disappearance ... is its immediacy. Tremblay doesn't shout or gesticulate. He whispers his tale, punctuating it with the 'clicks and whirrs' of an air conditioner or the life-mocking ring of a child's bicycle bell."
