= Paradise: Hope =

2013 film

- Film poster
- Directed by: Ulrich Seidl
- Written by: Veronika Franz; Ulrich Seidl
- Produced by: Ulrich Seidl
- Starring: Melanie Lenz
- Release dates: 8 February 2013 (Berlin); 22 February 2013 (Austria)
- Running time: 100 minutes
- Country: Austria
- Language: German

Paradise: Hope (German: Paradies: Hoffnung) is a 2013 Austrian drama film directed by Ulrich Seidl, the third in his Paradise trilogy. The film premiered in competition at the 63rd Berlin International Film Festival. It was screened in the Contemporary World Cinema section at the 2013 Toronto International Film Festival.

== Plot ==
While Melanie's mother spends her holidays in Kenya, a group of overweight teenagers goes to a diet camp in the Austrian mountains. Everyday life in the camp is marked by drills, rationed meals, and food counseling. At night, the girls discuss puberty problems, smoke cigarettes, and steal food from the kitchen. Melanie falls in love with her physician and director of the camp. The doctor is torn between the professional duty and his emotions, which become stronger against his will. At the end, he forces himself to prohibit further contact between him and Melanie, causing her deep distress.

== Cast ==
- Melanie Lenz as Melanie
- Verena Lehbauer as Verena
- Joseph Lorenz as the doctor
- Viviane Bartsch as the dietician

== Reception ==
In a positive review, Steven Boone noted "Seidl is fascinated with the little ways people decorate their lives to reflect the brighter future they are toiling for within a rigid system that both promises that future and continually denies it." He also pointed out that "Seidl's camera always stands back to let the women's environments and their orientation within them tell their stories in a way that can inspire compassionate recognition." In the New York Times, Stephen Holden observed that the movie "contemplates the tyranny of what is nowadays sometimes referred to as “body fascism” in a society that holds out nearly impossible ideals of beauty and youth."
