= Ulrich Seidl =

Austrian filmmaker (born 1952)

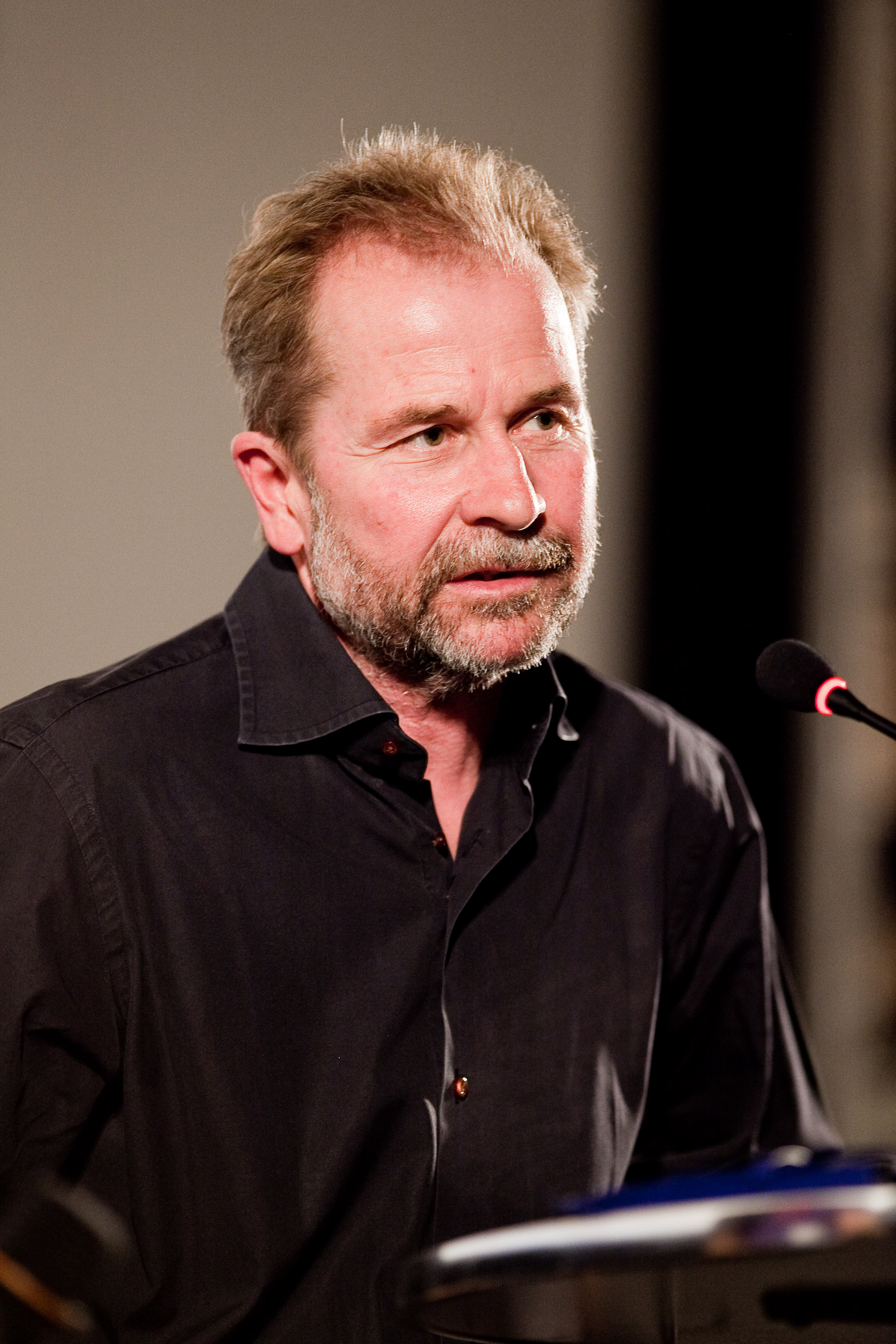
- Seidl in 2013
- Born: 24 November 1952 (age 73); Vienna, Austria
- Occupation: Film director
- Years active: 1980–present
- Website: http://www.ulrichseidl.at

Ulrich Maria Seidl (born 24 November 1952) is an Austrian filmmaker and producer. His films frequently explore sexual desires and contemporary Austrian society.

He is most known for Dog Days (2001), which won the Grand Jury Prize at the 58th Venice International Film Festival. While his Paradise: Love (2012) competed for the Palme d'Or, it's sequel Paradise: Faith (2012) won the Special Jury Prize at the 69th Venice International Film Festival, and the final part of the trilogy, Paradise: Hope (2013), competed for the Golden Bear.

== Biography ==
Ulrich Seidl grew up in Horn, Austria, in a strictly religious Catholic family of doctors. His first feature film was the documentary Good News, which he produced seven years after leaving the Vienna Film Academy. It contrasts the lives of the people who sell newspapers with those who read them.

Models depicts the everyday lives of second-rate Austrian models who, juggling clubbing, apartment work, and catalog shoots, try to lead a glamorous life, reacting to sexist photographers and disappointing relationships with exaggerated superficiality and cocaine use. The graphic film was confiscated in Slovenia. Animal Love portrays animal lovers who have strangely intimate emotional relationships with their pets. In 2001, he released Dog Days, his first feature film, which also includes professional actors. It won the Grand Jury Prize at the Venice Film Festival and achieved approximately 250,000 cinema admissions internationally.

Ulrich Seidl has had a close relationship with the Drosendorf Film Club for many years and maintains a second home in Drosendorf. The premiere of Dog Days took place at the film club.

In 2003, he co-founded Ulrich Seidl Film Produktion with Veronika Franz. Director and screenwriter Veronika Franz has been a long-time artistic collaborator on all of Ulrich Seidl's films since 1997. She co-wrote the screenplays with him for films such as Dog Days(2001), Import Export (2007), and the Paradise Trilogy (2012/13). Following Import Export (2007), the first film Seidl produced with his own production company, came his successful and award-winning Paradise Trilogy (2012/2013), whose films premiered in competition at Cannes, Venice, and Berlin. The first installment, Paradise: Love, tells the story of three women from the same family who spend their holidays separately. The other two parts focus on a Catholic missionary (Paradise: Faith) and a teenager at a diet camp (Paradise: Hope). In Paradise: Love, Margarethe Tiesel plays a sex tourist who travels from Austria to Kenya to experience love with young Black men. For this film, Seidl received his second invitation to the competition at the Cannes Film Festival in 2012. At the Austrian Film Awards, it won Best Film Production as well as Best Director and Best Actress (Margarethe Tiesel). In the same year, Seidl was invited to the competition at the Venice Film Festival for the second part of his trilogy, Paradise: Faith. The film tells the story of Maria Hofstätter, a single woman who, during her vacation, goes from house to house with a "wandering statue of the Virgin Mary" to make Austria more Catholic. At home, a conflict erupts over marriage and religion when her wheelchair-using husband, an Egyptian Muslim, returns to her after years of absence. The final part of the trilogy, Paradise: Hope, was invited to the competition at the 63rd Berlin International Film Festival .

The film In the Basement shows, among other scenes, men meeting in a cellar in Marz filled with Nazi memorabilia, and triggered the resignation of two of the filmed men as ÖVP (Austrian People's Party) municipal councilors.

In 2014, Seidl produced the horror film Goodnight Mommy (Ich seh Ich seh) with Ulrich Seidl Filmproduktion, starring twins Elias Schwarz and Lukas Schwarz. It was directed by the Austrian directing duo Veronika Franz and Severin Fiala. Goodnight Mommy, which premiered at the Venice Film Festival, was Austria's submission for the Best Foreign Language Film Oscar. A US remake of the film is in development, produced by the production company Animal Kingdom (“It Follows”, “It Comes at Night”).

In 2022, Seidl received an invitation to the competition at the 72nd Berlin International Film Festival for his feature film Rimini. In 2024, he was appointed to the jury of the 72nd San Sebastian International Film Festival.

== Style ==
Ulrich does not consider himself a documentary filmmaker, but several of his films often blend fiction and nonfiction. Several of his films are set in his home country, Austria.

=== Controversy ===
In early September 2022, Der Spiegel published a report alleging that some underage amateur actors had been "apparently exploited" during the filming of Seidl's film Sparta in Romania. The children's parents were not informed that the film dealt with, among other things, pedophilia, according to the allegations. Further accusations included nudity, violence, and excessively long working hours. Seidl refuted the article that same day, stating that it "assembled inaccurate portrayals, rumors, or incidents taken out of context... into a distorted picture that in no way corresponds to the facts"; he could not let this go unchallenged. The premiere of Sparta at the Toronto International Film Festival was canceled after the allegations became public. In mid-September 2022, members of the film crew raised further allegations in the Viennese newspaper Falter. The film was to be shown in Austria for the first time at the 60th Viennale at the end of October. In a statement in early October 2022, the Austrian Association of Film Directors criticized the media coverage, saying it had contributed to a prejudgment of Seidl.

== Filmography ==
=== Feature films ===
Year	English title	Original title	Notes
1990	Good News		
1992	Losses to Be Expected	Mit Verlust ist zu rechnen	
1995	Animal Love	Tierische Liebe	
1999	Models		
2001	Dog Days	Hundstage	
2002	State of the Nation	Zur Lage	
2003	Jesus, You Know	Jesus, Du weisst	
2007	Import/Export		
2012	Paradise: Love	Paradies: Liebe	Paradise trilogy
2012	Paradise: Faith	Paradies: Glaube	Paradise trilogy
2013	Paradise: Hope	Paradies: Hoffnung	Paradise trilogy
2014	In the Basement	Im Keller	Documentary
2016	Safari		Documentary
2022	Rimini		
2022	Sparta		
TBA	Distances	Distanzen	Post-production

=== Short films ===
- 1980: One Forty (Einsvierzig)
- 1982: The Prom (Der Ball)
- 2006: Brothers, Let Us Be Merry (Brüder, laßt uns lustig sein)

=== Television ===
- 1994: The Last Men (Die letzten Männer)
- 1996: Bilder einer Ausstellung (Pictures at an Exhibition)
- 1997: The Bosom Friend (Der Busenfreund)
- 1998: Fun without Limits (Spass ohne Grenzen)
- 2004: Our Father (Vater unser) (filmed stage play)

=== Producing credits ===
- 2014: Goodnight Mommy
- 2019: Lillian
- 2021: Luzifer
- 2024: Veni Vidi Vici
- 2024: The Devil's Bath

== Accolades ==
- IDF Amsterdam Special Jury Prize - 1993 Loss Is to Be Expected
- Sarajevo Audience Award - 1999 Models
- Gijón Grand Prix Asturias - 2001 Dog Days
- Venice Silver Lion - 2001 Dog Days
- Karlovy Vary Best Feature Documentary - 2003 Jesus, You Know
