= 40th Academy Awards =

- Official poster with original date
- Date: April 10, 1968
- Site: Santa Monica Civic Auditorium, Santa Monica, California
- Hosted by: Bob Hope
- Produced by: Arthur Freed
- Directed by: Richard Dunlap

Highlights
- Best Picture: In the Heat of the Night
- Most awards: In the Heat of the Night (5)
- Most nominations: Bonnie and Clyde and Guess Who's Coming to Dinner (10)

TV in the United States
- Network: ABC

The 40th Academy Awards were held on April 10, 1968, to honor film achievements of 1967. Originally scheduled for April 8, the awards were postponed to two days later due to the assassination of civil rights leader Martin Luther King Jr. Bob Hope was once again the host of the ceremony.

This year, due to the waning popularity of black-and-white films, Best Cinematography, Art Direction, and Costume Design, previously divided into separate awards for color and monochrome films, were merged into single categories. This was the first Oscars since 1948 to feature clips from the Best Picture nominees.

This year marked the first of two times that three different films were nominated for the "Big Five" Oscars (Picture, Director, Actor, Actress and Screenplay): Bonnie and Clyde, The Graduate and Guess Who's Coming to Dinner. While all three won major Oscars, Best Picture was awarded to Norman Jewison's thriller/mystery film, In the Heat of the Night. The same thing happened again at the ceremony for films from 1981 where the Best Picture winner was not one of the three films with "Big Five" nominations.

The Graduate became the seventh film to win Best Director and nothing else, and the last until Jane Campion won the award for The Power of the Dog at the 94th Academy Awards. For the first time since the introduction of the Academy Award for Best Costume Design in 1948, Edith Head did not receive a nomination, after tallying 30 nominations and 7 wins over the previous 18 years.

Due to an all-out push by Academy President Gregory Peck, 18 of the 20 acting nominees were present at the ceremony. Only Katharine Hepburn and Spencer Tracy, who died several months before the ceremony and was nominated posthumously, were missing. Edith Evans was the last performer born in the 1880s to receive an acting nomination (Best Actress, for her role in The Whisperers).

== Winners and nominees ==
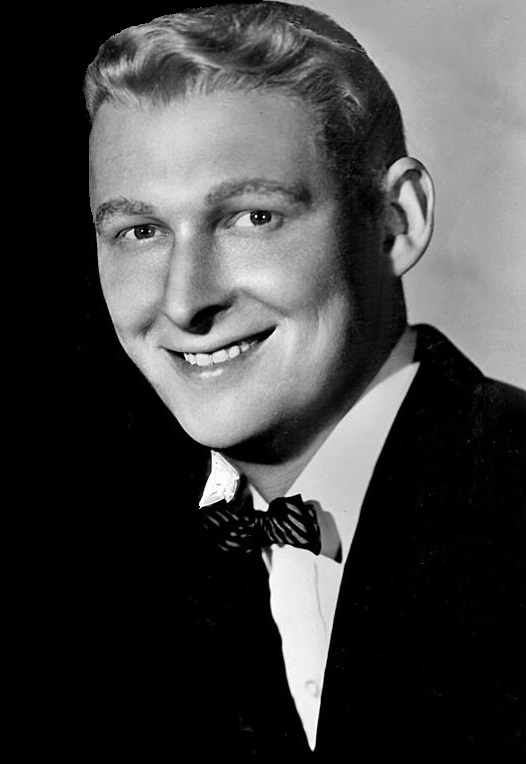
Mike Nichols, Best Director winner

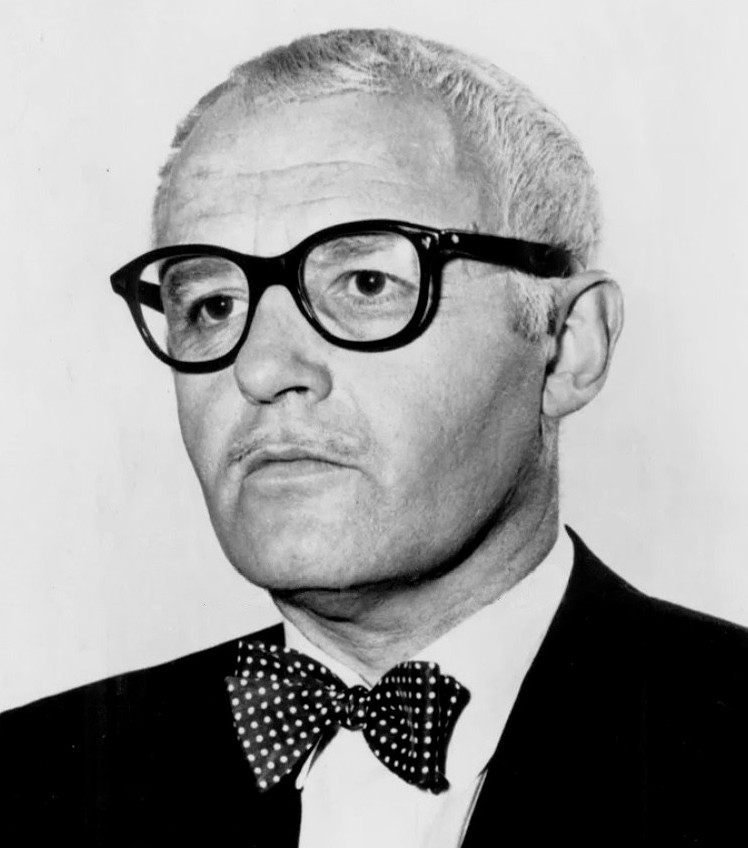
Rod Steiger, Best Actor winner

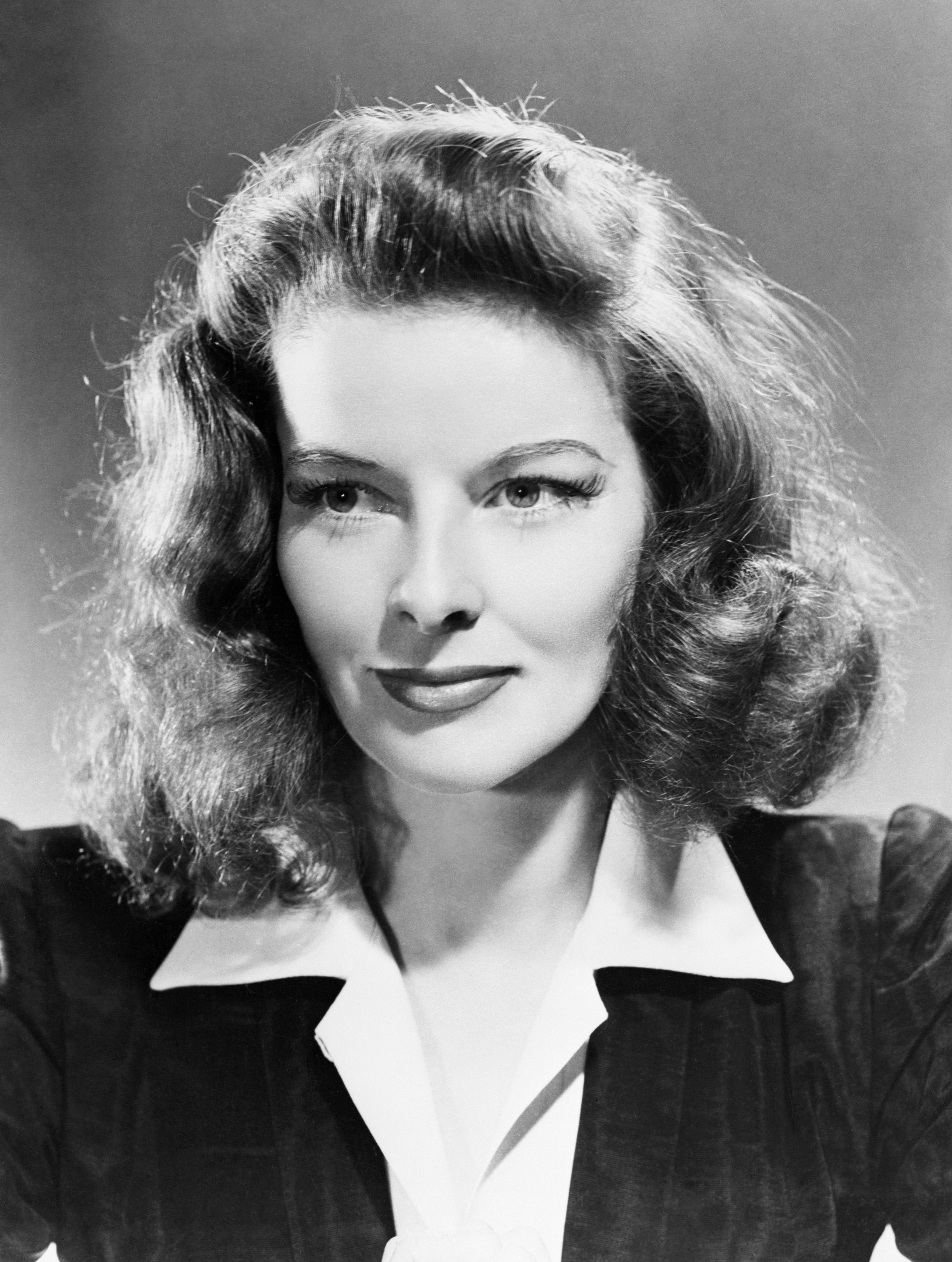
Katharine Hepburn, Best Actress winner

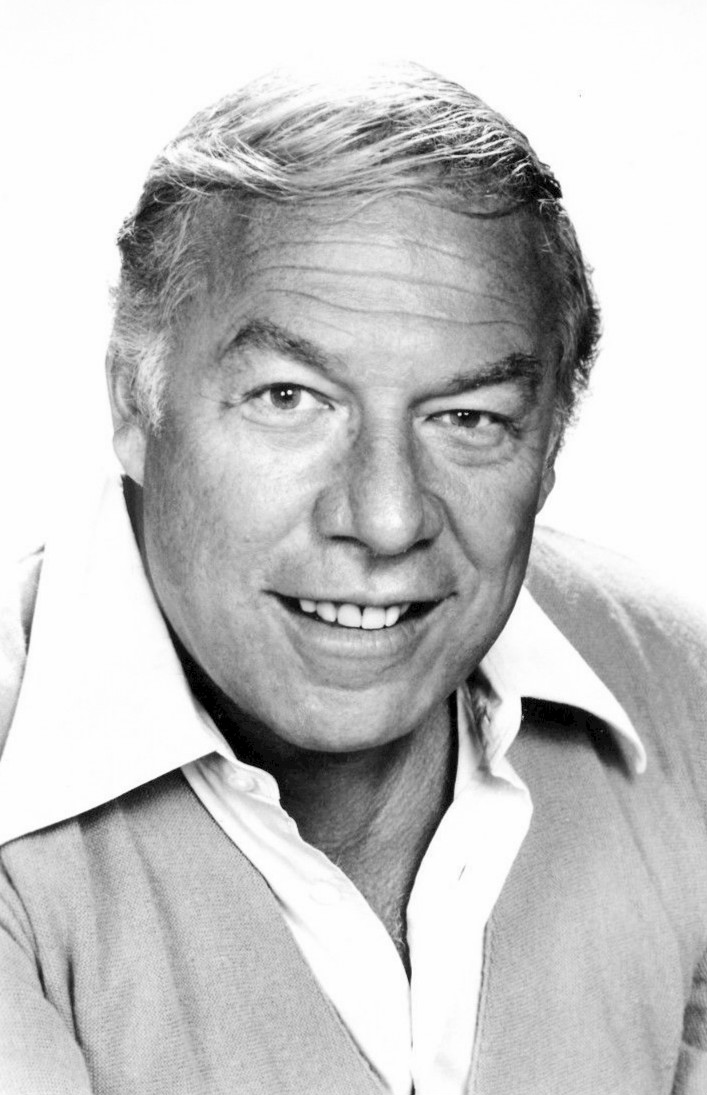
George Kennedy, Best Supporting Actor winner

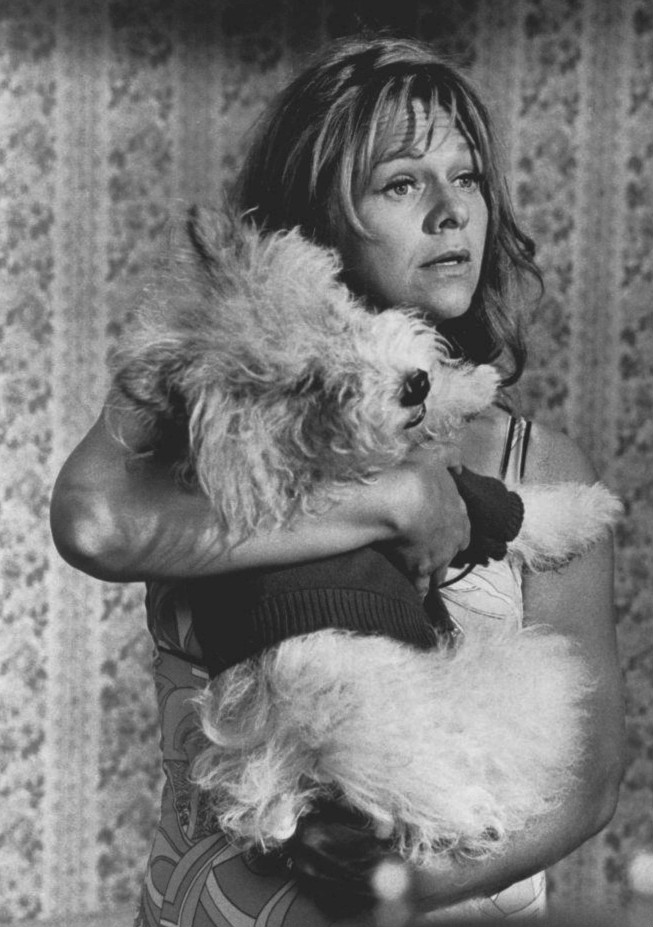
Estelle Parsons, Best Supporting Actress winner

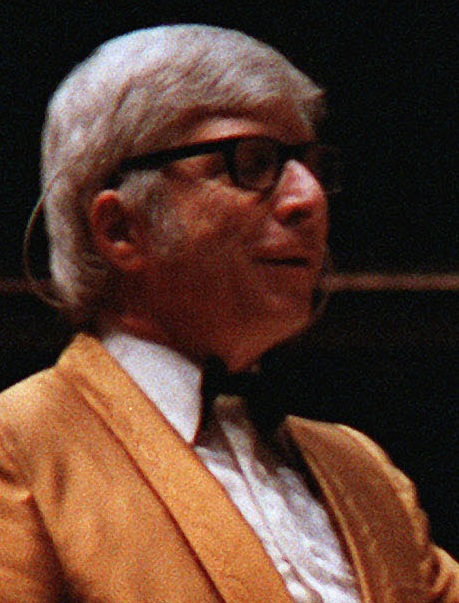
Elmer Bernstein, Best Original Score winner

Nominations were announced on February 19, 1968. Winners are listed first and highlighted in boldface.

**Best Picture**: **In the Heat of the Night — Walter Mirisch, producer**; Bonnie and Clyde — Warren Beatty, producer; Doctor Dolittle — Arthur P. Jacobs, producer; The Graduate — Lawrence Turman, producer; Guess Who's Coming to Dinner — Stanley Kramer, producer	**Best Directing**: **Mike Nichols – The Graduate**; Arthur Penn – Bonnie and Clyde; Stanley Kramer – Guess Who's Coming to Dinner; Richard Brooks – In Cold Blood; Norman Jewison – In the Heat of the Night
**Best Actor**: **Rod Steiger – In the Heat of the Night as Police Chief Bill Gillespie**; Warren Beatty – Bonnie and Clyde as Clyde Barrow; Dustin Hoffman – The Graduate as Benjamin Braddock; Paul Newman – Cool Hand Luke as Lucas "Cool Hand Luke" Jackson; Spencer Tracy (posthumous nomination) – Guess Who's Coming to Dinner as Matt Drayton	**Best Actress**: **Katharine Hepburn – Guess Who's Coming to Dinner as Christina Drayton**; Anne Bancroft – The Graduate as Mrs. Robinson; Faye Dunaway – Bonnie and Clyde as Bonnie Parker; Edith Evans – The Whisperers as Mrs. Ross; Audrey Hepburn – Wait Until Dark as Susy Hendrix
**Best Actor in a Supporting Role**: **George Kennedy – Cool Hand Luke as Dragline**; John Cassavetes – The Dirty Dozen as Victor Franko; Gene Hackman – Bonnie and Clyde as Buck Barrow; Cecil Kellaway – Guess Who's Coming to Dinner as Monsignor Ryan; Michael J. Pollard – Bonnie and Clyde as C.W. Moss	**Best Actress in a Supporting Role**: **Estelle Parsons – Bonnie and Clyde as Blanche Barrow**; Carol Channing – Thoroughly Modern Millie as Muzzy Van Hossmere; Mildred Natwick – Barefoot in the Park as Ethel Banks; Beah Richards – Guess Who's Coming to Dinner as Mrs. Mary Prentice; Katharine Ross – The Graduate as Elaine Robinson
**Best Writing (Story and Screenplay -- Written Directly for the Screen)**: **Guess Who's Coming to Dinner – William Rose**; Bonnie and Clyde – David Newman and Robert Benton; Divorce American Style – Screenplay by Norman Lear; Story by Robert Kaufman; Two for the Road – Frederic Raphael; The War Is Over – Jorge Semprún	**Best Writing (Screenplay -- Based on Material from Another Medium)**: **In the Heat of the Night – Stirling Silliphant based on the novel by John Ball**; Cool Hand Luke – Donn Pearce and Frank Pierson based on the novel by Donn Pearce; The Graduate – Buck Henry and Calder Willingham based on the novel by Charles Webb; In Cold Blood – Richard Brooks based on the novel by Truman Capote; Ulysses – Joseph Strick and Fred Haines based on the novel by James Joyce
**Best Foreign Language Film**: **Closely Watched Trains (Czechoslovakia)**; El amor brujo (Spain); I Even Met Happy Gypsies (Yugoslavia); Live for Life (France); Portrait of Chieko (Japan)	**Best Documentary (Feature)**: **The Anderson Platoon – Pierre Schoendoerffer**; Festival – Murray Lerner; Harvest – Carroll Ballard; A King's Story – Jack Le Vien; A Time for Burning – William C. Jersey
**Best Documentary (Short Subject)**: **The Redwoods – Mark Harris and Trevor Greenwood**; Monument to the Dream – Charles E. Guggenheim; A Place to Stand – Christopher Chapman; See You at the Pillar – Robert Fitchett; While I Run This Race – Carl V. Ragsdale	**Best Short Subject (Live Action)**: **A Place to Stand – Christopher Chapman**; Paddle to the Sea – Julian Biggs; Sky over Holland – John Ferno; Stop Look and Listen – Len Janson and Chuck Menville
**Best Short Subject (Cartoon)**: **The Box – Fred Wolf**; Hypothese Beta – Jean-Charles Meunier; What on Earth! – Robert Verrall and Wolf Koenig	**Best Music (Original Music Score)**: **Thoroughly Modern Millie – Elmer Bernstein**; Cool Hand Luke – Lalo Schifrin; Doctor Dolittle – Leslie Bricusse; Far from the Madding Crowd – Richard Rodney Bennett; In Cold Blood – Quincy Jones
**Best Music (Scoring of Music -- Adaptation or Treatment)**: **Camelot – Alfred Newman and Ken Darby**; Doctor Dolittle – Lionel Newman and Alexander Courage; Guess Who's Coming to Dinner – Frank De Vol; Thoroughly Modern Millie – André Previn and Joseph Gershenson; Valley of the Dolls – John Williams	**Best Music (Song)**: **"Talk to the Animals" from Doctor Dolittle — Music and Lyrics by Leslie Bricusse**; "The Bare Necessities" from The Jungle Book — Music and Lyrics by Terry Gilkyson; "The Eyes of Love" from Banning — Music by Quincy Jones; Lyrics by Bob Russell; "The Look of Love" from Casino Royale — Music by Burt Bacharach; Lyrics by Hal David; "Thoroughly Modern Millie" from Thoroughly Modern Millie — Music by Jimmy Van Heusen; Lyrics by Sammy Cahn
**Best Sound**: **In the Heat of the Night – Samuel Goldwyn Studio Sound Department**; Camelot – Warner Bros.-Seven Arts Studio Sound Department; The Dirty Dozen – Metro-Goldwyn-Mayer Studio Sound Department; Doctor Dolittle – 20th Century-Fox Studio Sound Department; Thoroughly Modern Millie – Universal City Studio Sound Department	**Best Sound Effects**: **The Dirty Dozen – John Poyner**; In the Heat of the Night – James Richard
**Best Art Direction**: **Camelot – Art Direction: John Truscott and Edward Carrere; Set Decoration: John W. Brown**; Doctor Dolittle – Art Direction: Mario Chiari, Jack Martin Smith and Ed Graves; Set Decoration: Walter M. Scott and Stuart A. Reiss; Guess Who's Coming to Dinner – Art Direction: Robert Clatworthy; Set Decoration: Frank Tuttle; The Taming of the Shrew – Art Direction: Renzo Mongiardino, John DeCuir, Elven Webb and Giuseppe Mariani; Set Decoration: Dario Simoni and Luigi Gervasi; Thoroughly Modern Millie – Art Direction: Alexander Golitzen and George C. Webb; Set Decoration: Howard Bristol	**Best Cinematography**: **Bonnie and Clyde – Burnett Guffey**; Camelot – Richard H. Kline; Doctor Dolittle – Robert L. Surtees; The Graduate – Robert L. Surtees; In Cold Blood – Conrad L. Hall
**Best Costume Design**: **Camelot – John Truscott**; Bonnie and Clyde – Theadora Van Runkle; The Happiest Millionaire – Bill Thomas; The Taming of the Shrew – Danilo Donati and Irene Sharaff; Thoroughly Modern Millie – Jean Louis	**Best Film Editing**: **In the Heat of the Night – Hal Ashby**; Beach Red – Frank P. Keller; The Dirty Dozen – Michael Luciano; Doctor Dolittle – Samuel E. Beetley and Marjorie Fowler; Guess Who's Coming to Dinner – Robert C. Jones
**Best Special Visual Effects**: **Doctor Dolittle – L. B. Abbott**; Tobruk – Howard A. Anderson Jr. and Albert Whitlock

=== Honorary Award ===
- To Arthur Freed for distinguished service to the Academy and the production of six top-rated Awards telecasts.

=== Jean Hersholt Humanitarian Award ===
- Gregory Peck

=== Irving G. Thalberg Memorial Award ===
- Alfred Hitchcock

== Multiple nominations and awards ==
These films had multiple nominations:

- 10 nominations: Bonnie and Clyde and Guess Who's Coming to Dinner
- 9 nominations: Doctor Dolittle
- 7 nominations: The Graduate, In the Heat of the Night and Thoroughly Modern Millie
- 5 nominations: Camelot
- 4 nominations: Cool Hand Luke, The Dirty Dozen and In Cold Blood
- 2 nominations: A Place to Stand and The Taming of the Shrew

The following films received multiple awards.

- 5 wins: In the Heat of the Night
- 3 wins: Camelot
- 2 wins: Bonnie and Clyde, Doctor Dolittle and Guess Who's Coming to Dinner

== Presenters and performers ==
The following individuals, listed in order of appearance, presented awards or performed musical numbers.

=== Presenters ===
Name	Role
Hank Simms	Announcer for the 40th Academy Awards
Gregory Peck (AMPAS President)	Gave opening remarks welcoming guests to the awards ceremony
Bill Miller	Explained the eligibility and voting rules to the public
Carol Channing	Presenter of the award for Best Sound
Patty Duke	Presenter of the award for Best Supporting Actor
Dustin Hoffman; Katharine Ross	Presenters of the award for Best Cinematography
Macdonald Carey; Diahann Carroll	Presenters of the Short Subjects Awards
Robert Morse; Barbara Rush	Presenters of the Documentary Awards
Eva Marie Saint	Presenter of the award for Best Costume Design
Bob Hope (host)	Presenter of the Honorary Award to Arthur Freed
Natalie Wood	Presenter of the award for Best Special Visual Effects
Richard Crenna; Elke Sommer	Presenters of the award for Best Sound Effects
Walter Matthau	Presenter of the award for Best Supporting Actress
Edith Evans	Presenter of the award for Best Film Editing
Rosalind Russell	Presenter of the Jean Hersholt Humanitarian Award to Gregory Peck
Danny Kaye	Presenter of the award for Best Foreign Language Film
Rock Hudson; Shirley Jones	Presenters of the award for Best Art Direction
Bob Hope	Presenter of the Academy Awards' history montage
Angie Dickinson; Gene Kelly	Presenters of the Music Awards
Barbra Streisand	Presenter of the award for Best Song
Sammy Davis Jr.	Accepted Leslie Bricusse's award on his behalf
Robert Wise	Presenter of the Irving G. Thalberg Memorial Award
Leslie Caron	Presenter of the award for Best Director
Claire Bloom; Rod Steiger	Presenters of the Writing Awards
Audrey Hepburn	Presenter of the award for Best Actor
Sidney Poitier	Presenter of the award for Best Actress
Julie Andrews	Presenter of the award for Best Picture

=== Performers ===
Name	Role	Performed
Elmer Bernstein	Musical arranger and conductor	Orchestral
Louis Armstrong	Performer	"The Bare Necessities" from The Jungle Book
Lainie Kazan	Performer	"The Eyes of Love" from Banning
Sérgio Mendes; Brasil '66	Performer	"The Look of Love" from Casino Royale
Sammy Davis Jr.	Performer	"Talk to the Animals" from Doctor Dolittle
Angela Lansbury	Performer	"Thoroughly Modern Millie" from Thoroughly Modern Millie
Academy Awards Orchestra	Performers	"Hooray for Hollywood/There's No Business like Show Business" (orchestral) during the closing credits

== See also ==
- 1967 in film
- 10th Grammy Awards
- 19th Primetime Emmy Awards
- 20th Primetime Emmy Awards
- 21st British Academy Film Awards
- 22nd Tony Awards
- 25th Golden Globe Awards
