= Donald Pearce =

Donald Pearce may refer to:

- Donn Pearce (Donald Mills Pearce, 1928–2017), American novelist, author of Cool Hand Luke
- Don Pearce (cricketer) (Donald Rex Pearce, 1941–1999), Australian cricketer

== See also ==
- Donald Pierce, fictional character in the Marvel Comics Universe
- Don Pierce (jockey) (1937–2026), American thoroughbred horse jockey
