= Cool Hand Luke (disambiguation) =

Cool Hand Luke may refer to:

- Cool Hand Luke (novel), a 1965 prison drama novel by Donn Pearce
- Cool Hand Luke, a 1967 American film by Warner Bros., based on the Donn Pearce novel
  - Cool Hand Luke (soundtrack), a soundtrack album for the 1967 film
- Cool Hand Luke (band), a Nashville-based Christian band
- Luke Humphries, darts player nicknamed Cool Hand Luke
