= Stuart Rosenberg =

American film and television director

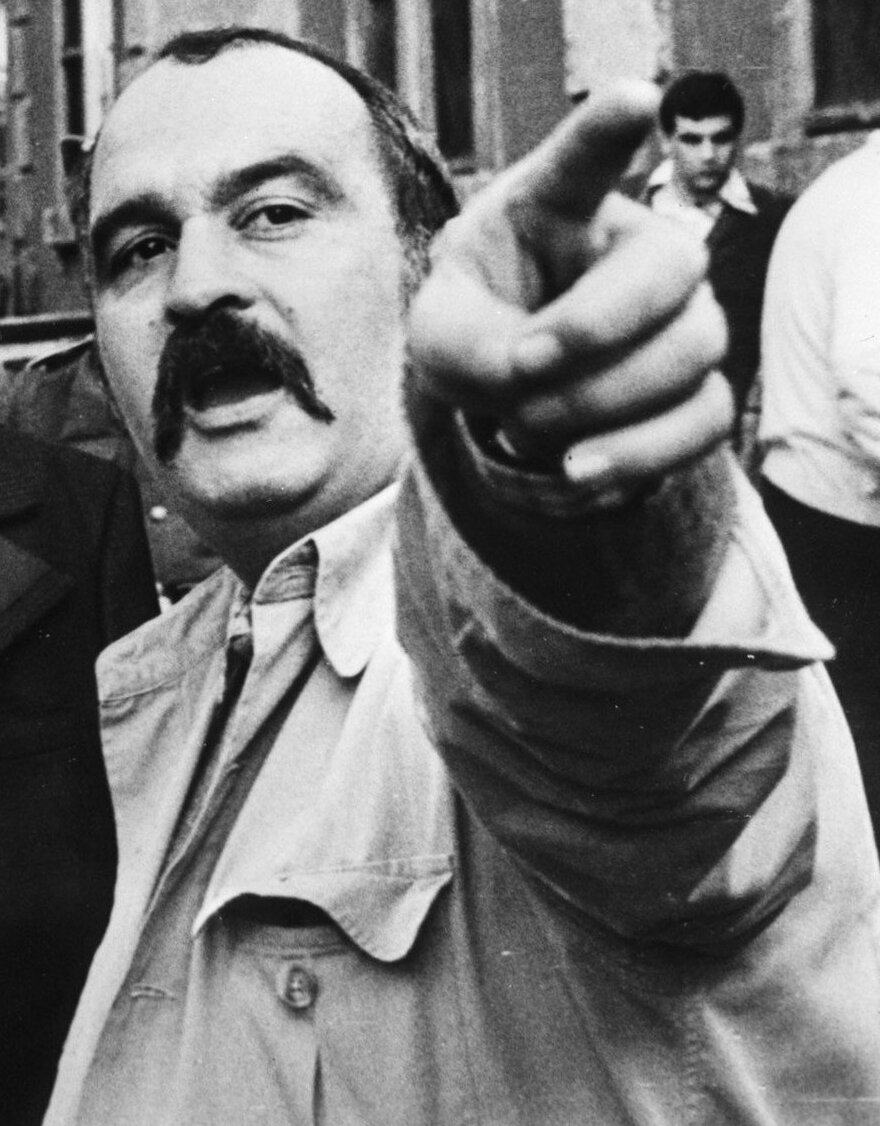
- Born: August 11, 1927; New York City, U.S.
- Died: March 15, 2007 (aged 79); Beverly Hills, California, U.S.
- Education: New York University
- Occupation: Director
- Spouse: Margot Pohoryles

Stuart Rosenberg (August 11, 1927 – March 15, 2007) was an American film and television director. He was most noted for his collaborations with actor Paul Newman, whom he directed in Cool Hand Luke (1967), WUSA (1970), Pocket Money (1972), and The Drowning Pool (1975). He was a five-time Directors Guild of America Award nominee, and a Primetime Emmy Award winner.

His other notable films included Question 7 (1961), Voyage of the Damned (1976), The Amityville Horror (1979), Brubaker (1980) and The Pope of Greenwich Village (1984). Later in his career, he taught directing at the American Film Institute, where his students included Todd Field and Darren Aronofsky.

== Early life ==
Rosenberg was born to Jewish parents in Brooklyn, New York City on August 11, 1927. He studied Irish literature at New York University, and began working as an apprentice film editor while in graduate school.

== Career ==
After advancing to film editor, he began directing with episodes of the television series Decoy (1957–1959), starring Beverly Garland as an undercover police woman. It was the first police series on American television built around a female protagonist. Over the next two years, Rosenberg directed 15 episodes of the police-detective series Naked City (1958–1963), which like Decoy was shot in New York City. Meanwhile, Rosenberg was then hired to direct his first film, Murder, Inc. (1960), starring Peter Falk, but a strike by both the Screen Actors Guild and the Writers Guild resulted in his leaving the film and being replaced by its producer, Burt Balaban. Rosenberg returned to television, directing 15 episodes of The Untouchables, eight of the anthology series Bob Hope Presents the Chrysler Theatre, five of Alfred Hitchcock Presents, and three of The Twilight Zone, along with episodes of Adventures in Paradise, The Barbara Stanwyck Show, Ben Casey, Rawhide with Clint Eastwood, and Falk's The Trials of O'Brien. He won a 1963 Emmy Award for directing "The Madman", one of his 19 episodes of the courtroom drama The Defenders.

Following the U.S.-German co-production Question 7 (1961), filmed in West Berlin, Rosenberg shot the 1965 TV movie Memorandum for a Spy and the 1966 telefilm Fame Is the Name of the Game. In July 1965, he was signed to a non-exclusive contract with actor Jack Lemmon's independent film production company, Jalem Productions, which called for the director to make for them three pictures in five years. This led to his major-studio distributed debut, the Paul Newman hit Cool Hand Luke (1967). Rosenberg had come across Donn Pearce's chain gang novel and developed the film with actor Jack Lemmon's production company Jalem. He was next announced to direct Lemmon in the comedy film The Job Hunter, based on a novel by Allen R. Dodd, for Jalem Productions-Warner Brothers Pictures, but this was abandoned. Also for Jalem Productions, he made The April Fools (1969), with French actress Catherine Deneuve in her American debut opposite Jack Lemmon (who plays the first Rosenberg lead character named H. Brubaker).

Other Rosenberg films include the Newman movies WUSA (1970), Pocket Money (1972) and The Drowning Pool (1975); the Walter Matthau police-detective thriller The Laughing Policeman (1973); the Charles Bronson action picture Love and Bullets (1979); and another action movie Let's Get Harry (1986), for which Rosenberg used the pseudonym Alan Smithee. He was famous for straight dramas and especially crime films. The most acclaimed movie he did after Cool Hand Luke was The Pope of Greenwich Village. Years later, Rosenberg replaced Bob Rafelson on the prison movie Brubaker (1980).

He made his last film, the independent drama My Heroes Have Always Been Cowboys in 1991.

In 1992, Rosenberg became a teacher at the American Film Institute. Among his students were Todd Field, Darren Aronofsky, Mark Waters, Scott Silver, Doug Ellin and Rob Schmidt.

== Personal life and legacy ==
Rosenberg died in 2007 of a heart attack at his home in Beverly Hills, California. He was survived by his wife Margot Pohoryles, whom he had met at New York University; son Benjamin Rosenberg, a first assistant director; as well as four grandchildren.

== Filmography ==
- Murder, Inc. (1960)
- Question 7 (1961)
- Cool Hand Luke (1967)
- The April Fools (1969)
- Move (1970)
- WUSA (1970)
- Pocket Money (1972)
- The Laughing Policeman (1973)
- The Drowning Pool (1975)
- Voyage of the Damned (1976)
- Love and Bullets (1979)
- The Amityville Horror (1979)
- Brubaker (1980)
- The Pope of Greenwich Village (1984)
- Let's Get Harry (1986)
- My Heroes Have Always Been Cowboys (1991)

== Awards ==
- 1961 National Board of Review Winner, Best Film of the Year for Question 7 and selected for Top Ten Films of the Year for Question 7
- 1961 Berlin International Film Festival OCIC Award, for Question 7
- 1961 Berlin International Film Festival Youth Film Award, Best Feature Film Suitable for Young People, for Question 7
- 1961 nomination, Berlin International Film Festival Golden Bear, for Question 7
- 1963 Emmy Award, Outstanding Directorial Achievement in Drama, for The Defenders: "The Madman"
- 1967 nomination, Directors Guild of America Award: Outstanding Directorial Achievement in Motion Pictures, for: Cool Hand Luke
- 1977 nomination, Golden Globe Awards: Best Picture of Year for Voyage of the Damned
