= Camelot (soundtrack) =

Camelot: Original Motion Picture Sound Track

Soundtrack album
- Released: 1967
- Recorded: 1966–1967
- Genres: Show tunes, film score
- Label: Warner Bros. Records
- Producer: Sonny Burke

Professional ratings
Review scores
Source	Rating
Billboard	positive ("Spotlight" pick)
AllMusic	3/5 stars

The original soundtrack to the 1967 film Camelot was released by Warner Bros. Records.

Billboard reviewed the album in its issue from 28 October 1967, writing: "Camelot could be one of the big pictures of the year, and the track album should ride right along with the box office sales. The album is well-produced".

The album peaked at number 11 on the U.S. Billboard Top LPs chart for four consecutive weeks in February 1967 and continued to chart until July 1969. It was certified Gold by RIAA on 17 September 1968 and Platinum on 13 October 1986.

== Track listing ==
LP – Warner Bros. B 1712 (mono), BS 1712 (stereo)

Side 1
No.	Title	Performer(s)	Length
1.	"Prelude and Overture"
2.	"I Wonder What the King Is Doing Tonight"	King Arthur
3.	"The Simple Joys of Maidenhood"	Guenevere
4.	"Camelot and the Wedding Ceremony"	King Arthur and mixed chorus
5.	"C'est moi"	Lancelot
6.	"The Lusty Month of May"	Guenevere and mixed chorus
7.	"Follow Me and Children's Chorus"
8.	"How to Handle a Woman"	King Arthur

Side 2
No.	Title	Performer(s)	Length
1.	"Take Me to the Fair"	Guenevere and the 3 knights
2.	"If Ever I Would Leave You ...Love Montage"	Lancelot
3.	"What Do the Simple Folk Do?"	King Arthur and Guenevere
4.	"I Loved You Once in Silence"	Guenevere and Lancelot
5.	"Guenevere"	Mixed chorus
6.	"Finale ultimo"	King Arthur and mixed chorus

== Cast ==
- Richard Harris as King Arthur
- Vanessa Redgrave as Guenevere
- Franco Nero as Lancelot

== Charts ==
Chart (1968)	Peak position
US Billboard Top LPs	11

== Certifications ==
Region	Certification	Certified units/sales
United States (RIAA)	Platinum	1,000,000^{^}
^{^} Shipments figures based on certification alone.
