= Camelot (film) =

1967 musical film directed by Joshua Logan

- Theatrical release poster by Bob Peak
- Directed by: Joshua Logan
- Screenplay by: Alan Jay Lerner
- Based on: Camelot (1960 musical) by Lerner and Loewe; The Once and Future King (1958 novel) by T. H. White
- Produced by: Jack L. Warner
- Starring: Richard Harris; Vanessa Redgrave; Franco Nero; David Hemmings; Lionel Jeffries; Laurence Naismith
- Cinematography: Richard H. Kline
- Edited by: Folmar Blangsted
- Music by: Frederick Loewe (score); Alan Jay Lerner (lyrics); Alfred Newman (adaptation)
- Production company: Warner Bros.-Seven Arts
- Distributed by: Warner Bros.-Seven Arts
- Release date: October 25, 1967
- Running time: 180 minutes
- Country: United States
- Language: English
- Budget: $13 million
- Box office: $31.1 million

Camelot is a 1967 American musical fantasy drama film directed by Joshua Logan and written by Alan Jay Lerner, based on the 1960 stage musical of the same name by Lerner and Frederick Loewe. It stars Richard Harris as King Arthur, Vanessa Redgrave as Guenevere, Franco Nero as Lancelot, David Hemmings as Mordred and Lionel Jeffries as Pellinore.

In April 1961, Warner Bros. Pictures obtained the rights to produce a film adaptation, with Lerner attached to write the screenplay. However, it was temporarily shelved as the studio decided to adapt My Fair Lady first. In 1966, development resumed with Joshua Logan hired as director. Original cast members Richard Burton and Julie Andrews were approached to reprise their roles from the stage musical, but both declined and were replaced with Harris and Redgrave. Filming took place on location in Spain and on the Warner Bros. studio lot in Burbank, California.

Camelot was released on October 25, 1967, to mixed reviews, but was a commercial success, grossing $31.5 million against a $13 million budget and becoming the tenth highest-grossing film of 1967. It received five nominations for the 40th Academy Awards and won three: Best Score, Best Production Design, and Best Costume Design. It also won three Golden Globe Awards, for Best Actor – Motion Picture Musical or Comedy (Richard Harris), Best Original Song (for "If Ever I Would Leave You"), and Best Original Score.

== Plot ==
As King Arthur prepares for battle against his former friend, Sir Lancelot, with his son, Mordred, raising an army against him back in England, he reflects on the sad circumstances which have led him to this situation.

He recalls the night of his marriage to Guenevere. It is an arranged marriage, and he is afraid of what lies ahead ("I Wonder What the King is Doing Tonight"). Guenevere herself is worried about marrying a man she has never met and longs for the romantic life of a fought-over maiden ("The Simple Joys of Maidenhood"). They converse, and as she does not know his true identity, she fantasizes about escaping with him. Arthur tells her what a wonderful place his kingdom is ("Camelot"). She finds herself drawn to him, but they are interrupted by his men and her entourage. Arthur's identity is revealed, and Guenevere gladly goes with him to be married.

Four years later, Arthur explores with Guenevere his idea for a Round Table that would seat all the noble knights of the realm, reflecting not only a crude type of democratic ideal, but also the political unification of England. Inspired by Arthur's ideas, the French Knight Lancelot makes his way to England with his squire Dap, boasting of his superior virtues ("C'est Moi"). Lancelot's prowess impresses Arthur, and they become friends; however, many of the knights instantly despise Lancelot for his self-righteousness and boastfulness. Back in Camelot, Guinevere and the women frolic and gather flowers to celebrate the coming of spring ("The Lusty Month of May").

Guenevere, who initially dislikes Lancelot, incites three of the best knights to challenge him to a joust ("Then You May Take Me To The Fair"). Arthur ponders how distant Guenevere has become ("How to Handle a Woman"). Guenevere's plan goes awry as Lancelot easily defeats all three, critically wounding Sir Dinadan. A horrified Lancelot pleads for Sir Dinadan to live, and as he lays hands on him, Dinadan miraculously recovers. Guenevere is so overwhelmed and humbled that her feelings for Lancelot begin to change. Despite his vows of celibacy, Lancelot falls in love with Guenevere.

Guinevere and Lancelot meet in secret to discuss their future. Lancelot vows that he should leave and never come back, but finds it impossible to consider leaving Guenevere ("If Ever I Would Leave You"). Arthur decides to rise above the scandal. Mordred, Arthur's illegitimate son, arrives at Camelot determined to bring down the fellowship of the Round Table by stirring up trouble. All this takes its toll on Arthur's disposition, and Guenevere tries to cheer him up ("What Do the Simple Folk Do?") despite her conflicted emotions.

Mordred persuades Arthur to stay out hunting all night as a test, knowing that Lancelot will visit Guenevere in her bedchamber. Lancelot and Guenevere sing of their forbidden love and how wrong it has all gone ("I Loved You Once In Silence"). Mordred and several knights catch the lovers together. Lancelot escapes, but Guenevere is arrested. Thanks to Arthur's new civil court and trial by jury, she is sentenced to die by burning at the stake. Bound by his own law, Arthur cannot spare her. Preparations are made for Guenevere's burning ("Guenevere"), but Lancelot rescues her at the last minute, much to Arthur's relief.

On the eve of his battle with Lancelot, Arthur receives a surprise visit from Lancelot and Guenevere, at the edge of the woods, where she has taken residence at a convent. The three share an emotional farewell.

Prior to the battle, Arthur stumbles across a young boy named Tom, who espouses his commitment to Arthur's original ideal of "Not might 'makes' right, but might 'for' right." Arthur realizes that, although most of his plans have fallen through, the ideals of Camelot live on in this simple boy. He knights Tom and gives him his orders: run behind the lines and survive the battle, so that he can tell future generations about the legend of Camelot. Watching Tom leave, Arthur regains his hope for the future ("Camelot (reprise)").

== Cast ==
- Richard Harris as Arthur
  - Nicholas Beauvy as young Arthur
- Vanessa Redgrave as Guenevere
- Franco Nero as Lancelot
  - Gene Merlino as Lancelot's singing voice (uncredited)
- David Hemmings as Mordred
- Lionel Jeffries as Pellinore
- Laurence Naismith as Merlin
- Pierre Olaf as Dap
- Estelle Winwood as Lady Clarinda
- Gary Marshal as Sir Lionel
- Anthony Rogers as Sir Dinadan
- Peter Bromilow as Sir Sagramore
- Sue Casey as Lady Sibyl
- Gary Marsh as Tom of Warwick
- Fredric Abbott as Sir Geoffrey (uncredited)
- Leon Greene as Sir Turloc (uncredited)
- Michael Kilgarriff as Sir Paul (uncredited)

== Production ==
=== Development ===
In April 1961, it was reported that Warner Bros. Pictures had purchased the rights to produce a film adaptation of the stage musical with Alan Jay Lerner hired to pen the screenplay. That month, it was reported that Rock Hudson had signed as King Arthur. In May 1961, Shirley Jones was reportedly in talks to play Guenevere. However, development was placed on hold when Warner Bros. fast-tracked a film adaptation of the musical My Fair Lady, for which they acquired the screen rights from CBS for $5.5 million. It was also stipulated that Camelot would not be released before April 1964. Nevertheless, in April 1963, Jack L. Warner hired television executive William T. Orr as producer. It was also reported that Orr had sought for original cast members Richard Burton and Robert Goulet to star in their respective roles, and Elizabeth Taylor to star as Guenevere. In December 1963, Orr left the project after being appointed Jack L. Warner's executive assistant.

Robert Wise was asked to direct, but production chief Walter MacEwen noted, "He does not want to type himself as a director of musical subjects—and he still has The Gertrude Lawrence Story, which falls in that category, on his slate for next year." In March 1966, it was reported that Joshua Logan would direct, with principal photography to begin in August.

=== Casting ===
Warner approached Burton to reprise his stage role as Arthur, but he demanded a higher salary than the studio was willing to pay, as a result of which the negotiations ceased. In his place, Peter O'Toole, Gregory Peck and Marlon Brando were considered. While filming Hawaii (1966), Richard Harris learned of Camelot and actively sought the role. For four months, Harris sent complimentary letters, cables and offers for a screen test to Lerner, Logan and Jack Warner, indicating his interest in the role. Logan refused his offer due to his lack of singing abilities. When Logan returned to the Dorchester after having his morning jog, Harris ambushed him about the role, and Logan finally relented, as Harris offered to pay for his own screen test. Harris later hired cinematographer Nicolas Roeg to direct his screen test, which impressed Logan and Warner, who both agreed to hire him.

For the role of Guenevere, Julie Andrews, Audrey Hepburn and Julie Christie were on the studio's short list, while Jack Warner separately considered Polly Bergen, Ann-Margret and Mitzi Gaynor. Andrews had learned of the movie adaptation while filming Hawaii, but she declined. However, Logan desperately wanted to cast Vanessa Redgrave after watching her performance in Morgan – A Suitable Case for Treatment (1966). At the time, Redgrave was performing in the stage play The Prime of Miss Jean Brodie so Logan had to wait several months for her availability. Despite Redgrave's not being a traditional singer, Logan was impressed by her renditions of folk songs that he listened to. The studio was initially reluctant, due to her left-wing activism, but Logan negotiated for her casting until after she fulfilled her stage commitments. Redgrave was signed in November, 1966 for $200,000 and permitted to do her own singing.

Although the studio initially sought a Frenchman, Italian actor Franco Nero was cast as Lancelot based on recommendations from Harris and John Huston, who worked with Nero on The Bible: In the Beginning... (1966). Although Logan was aware of Nero's thick Italian accent, he initially permitted him to do his own singing. The first scene shot was his performance of the musical number "C'est Moi", after which Logan decided Nero's singing voice was incompatible with the song's musical arrangement. Nero's singing voice was dubbed by professional playback singer Gene Merlino, while Nero was given a speech coach to help improve his English.

=== Filming ===
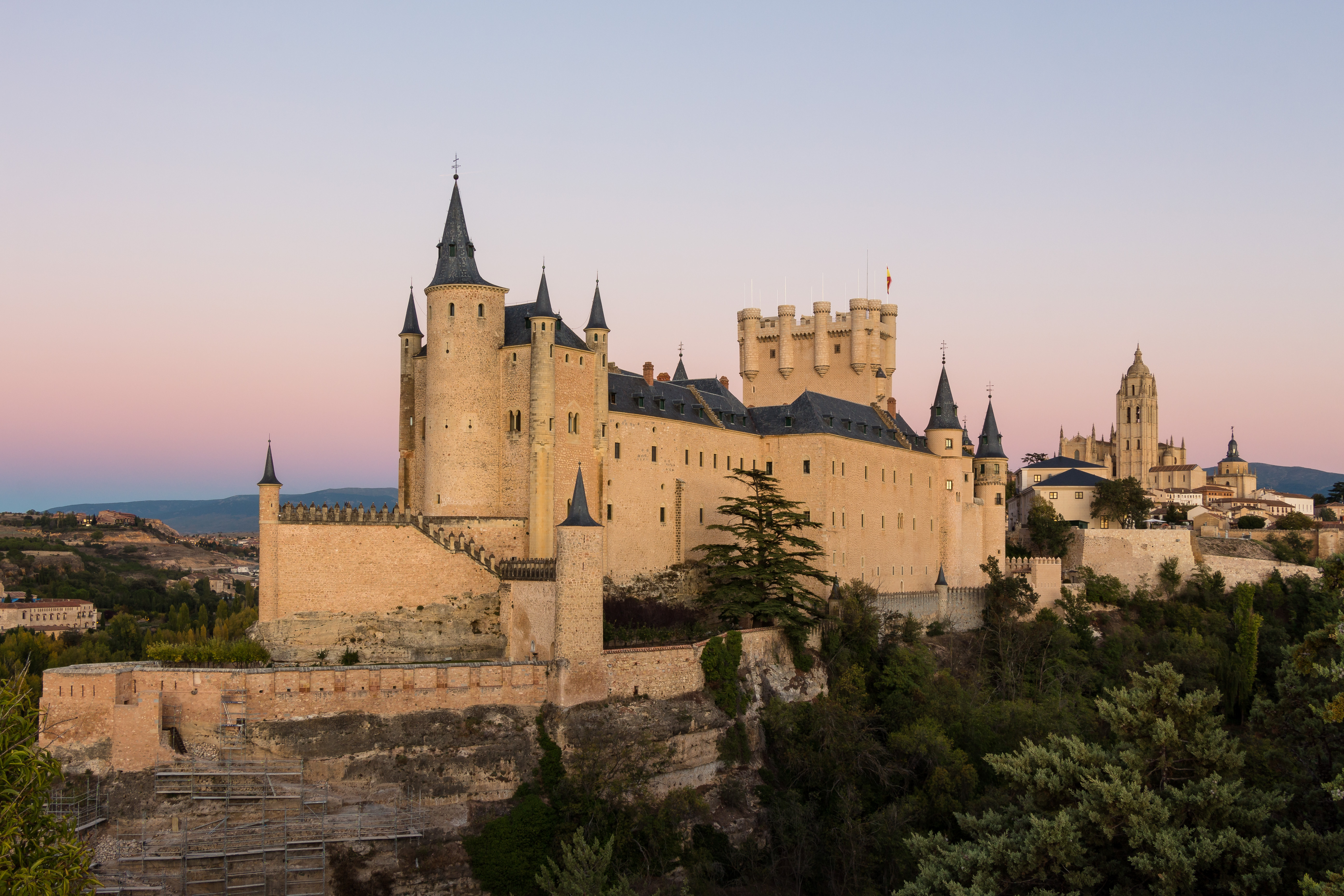
The medieval fortress Alcázar of Segovia in Spain (pictured here) was used as the exterior castle for Joyous Gard, Lancelot du Lac's castle.

Richard H. Kline came to the attention of Logan after he had watched footage from Chamber of Horrors (1966), which contained medieval castle doors with a carriage drawn by a team of gray horses rolling through a bricked courtyard that had been shot with muted colors of the woods and mist. Impressed, Logan hired Kline as cinematographer. For Camelot, Kline wanted to shoot the film in a more authentically textured style rather than the polished look of Hollywood musicals, and used pre-flashing techniques in order to mute colors and control contrast.

As his first film credit, 29-year-old Australian set designer John Truscott, who created the sets for the London and Melbourne stage productions of Camelot, was hired as production designer. According to Logan, Truscott envisioned the visual design that resembled "neither Gothic or Romanesque but an in between period, suggesting a legendary time". The Castillo de Coca was the inspiration for the film's production design, which was recreated on the studio backlot in Burbank, California. The finished castle was the largest set ever constructed at the time, at 400 by 300 feet, and nearly 100 feet tall, with a reported cost of half a million dollars. Logan told the Los Angeles Times, "It was absolutely necessary, since we expect to do everything right in this picture—even to matching Spanish and Hollywood cobblestones."

In September 1966, shooting commenced in Spain with a 30-day shooting schedule. For exteriors, Logan selected seven castles on the country's mainland and another on the island of Majorca, including the Alcázar of Segovia, used as Lancelot du Lac's castle, and the Medina del Campo. However, the location shoot had setbacks due to the country's rainfall and high temperatures, and finished 12 days behind schedule, yielding half an hour of usable footage. With production underway, Jack Warner decided that Camelot would be the last film he would produce for the studio, and on November 14, 1966, sold a substantial share of studio stock to Seven Arts Productions. The sale was finalized on November 27, for approximately $32 million in cash.

Following the location shoot in Spain, the filming unit took a hiatus until Redgrave finished her stage duties. By then, 15 of the studio's 23 stage sets were occupied for Camelot. Filming was further complicated when Harris required 12 facial stitches after he fell down in his shower. The stitches reopened when Harris went out to party (against the doctor's orders), further delaying his recovery. Plastic surgery was later applied to disguise the wound.

On the LP soundtrack album, "Take Me to the Fair" appears after "How to Handle a Woman", and "Follow Me" (with new lyrics written for the film) is listed after "The Lusty Month of May".

Although actor David Hemmings was the only classically trained singer among the principal cast, his character Mordred's solo number "The Seven Deadly Virtues" (as sung by non-singer Roddy McDowall in the original Broadway production and included on the Broadway cast album) was cut from the film and thus does not appear on the film soundtrack.

== Historical context ==
William Johnson, writing in the journal Film Quarterly, noted that "some of Arthur's speeches could be applied directly to Vietnam," such as Arthur's "Might for Right" ideal and repeated musings over border lines. Retrospectively, Alice Grellner suggested the movie served as "an escape from the disillusionment of Vietnam, the bitterness and disenchantment of the antiwar demonstrations, and the grim reality of the war on the evening television news" and reminder of John F. Kennedy's presidency.

== Release ==
On October 25, 1967, Camelot premiered at the Warner Theatre on Broadway and 47th Street. A benefit premiere was held on November 1 at the Cinerama Dome in Los Angeles. While the official running time was 180 minutes including overture, entr'acte and exit music, only the 70mm blow up prints and 35mm magnetic stereo prints contained that running time. For the general wide release, the film was truncated to 150 minutes.

=== Home media ===
In April 2012, the film was released on Blu-ray in conjunction with the film's 45th anniversary. The release was accompanied with an audio commentary, four behind-the-scenes featurettes and five theatrical trailers.

== Reception ==
=== Box office ===
Camelot was the tenth highest-grossing film of 1967, earning $12.3 million in the United States and Canada. During its 1973 rerelease, it grossed $2 million in box office rentals.

=== Critical reaction ===
Film Quarterly's William Johnson called Camelot "Hollywood at its best and worst," praising the film's ideals and Harris and Redgrave's performances but bemoaning its lavish sets and three-hour-running time. Bosley Crowther of The New York Times called Redgrave "dazzling" but criticized the film's conflicting moods and uncomfortable close-ups. Crowther felt the main characters were not sufficiently fleshed out to evoke any sympathy from the audience, concluding that the film lacked "magic". Variety magazine ran a positive review, declaring that the film "qualifies as one of Hollywood's alltime great screen musicals," praising the "clever screenplay" and "often exquisite sets and costumes." Clifford Terry of the Chicago Tribune was also positive, calling it "a beautiful, enjoyable splash of optical opiate" with "colorful sets, bright costumes and three fine performances."

Richard L. Coe of The Washington Post wrote, "Long, leaden and lugubrious, the Warner's 'Camelot' is 15 million dollars worth of wooden nickels. Besides being hopelessly, needlessly lavish, this misses the point squarely on the nail: what was so hot about King Arthur? We never really are told." He added that Richard Harris as Arthur gave "the worst major performance in years." Charles Champlin of the Los Angeles Times called the film "a very considerable disappointment," writing that its moments of charm "simply cannot cancel out the slow static pace, the lack of style, the pinched and artificial quality of the proceedings, the jumpy and inconsistent cuts, the incessant overuse of close-ups, the failure to sustain emotional momentum, the fatal wavering between reality and fantasy, the inability to exploit the resources of the film medium."

Brendan Gill of The New Yorker declared, "On Broadway, 'Camelot' was a vast, costly, and hollow musical comedy, and the movie version is, as might have been predicted, vaster, more costly, and even more hollow." The Monthly Film Bulletin of the UK wrote, "A dull play has become an even duller film, with practically no attempt at translation into the other medium, and an almost total neglect of the imaginative possibilities of the splendid material embodied in the Arthurian legend. Why, for instance, is Arthur not shown extracting Excalibur from the rock instead of merely talking about it? Such is the stuff of film scenes." On the review aggregator website Rotten Tomatoes, Camelot holds an approval rating of 39%, based on 18 reviews with an average rating of 6.2/10.

=== Awards and nominations ===
Award	Category	Nominee(s)	Result	Ref.
Academy Awards	Best Art Direction	John Truscott, Edward Carrere (art direction); John W. Brown (set decoration)	Won	
Academy Awards	Best Cinematography	Richard H. Kline	Nominated	
Academy Awards	Best Costume Design	John Truscott	Won	
Academy Awards	Best Original Song Score or Adaptation Score	Alfred Newman, Ken Darby	Won	
Academy Awards	Best Sound	Warner Bros.-Seven Arts Studio Sound Department	Nominated	
Golden Globe Awards	Best Motion Picture – Musical or Comedy	Camelot	Nominated	
Golden Globe Awards	Best Actor in a Motion Picture – Musical or Comedy	Richard Harris	Won	
Golden Globe Awards	Best Actress in a Motion Picture – Musical or Comedy	Vanessa Redgrave	Nominated	
Golden Globe Awards	Most Promising Newcomer – Male	Franco Nero	Nominated	
Golden Globe Awards	Best Original Score – Motion Picture	Frederick Loewe	Won	
Golden Globe Awards	Best Original Song – Motion Picture	"If Ever I Should Leave You" (music: Federick Loewe, lyrics: Alan Jay Lerner)	Won	
Kansas City Film Critics Circle Awards	Best Actress	Vanessa Redgrave	Won (Note: Tied with Lynn Redgrave for Georgy Girl.)	
Writers Guild of America Awards	Best Written American Musical	Alan Jay Lerner	Nominated	

The film is recognized by American Film Institute in these lists:

- 2004: AFI's 100 Years...100 Songs:
  - "Camelot" – Nominated

== Legacy ==
Despite its high cost, Camelot was widely criticized for its "cheap" appearance, having obviously been filmed on architecturally ambiguous sets amidst the chaparral-covered hills of Burbank rather than an authentic medieval castle amidst the green hills of England. As a result, it was one of the last big-budget American films that attempted to physically construct a large-scale full-size set on a studio backlot to represent an exotic foreign location. American filmmakers have subsequently used location shooting for exterior shots.

A lifesize statue of Richard Harris, as King Arthur in the film, was erected in the centre of Bedford Row, in Harris's home town of Limerick. Its sculptor was the Irish sculptor Jim Connolly, a graduate of the Limerick School of Art and Design.

== See also ==
- List of American films of 1967
- List of films based on Arthurian legend

== Bibliography ==
- Kennedy, Matthew (2014). Roadshow!: The Fall of Film Musicals in the 1960s. Oxford University Press. ISBN 978-0-199-92567-4.
