= Don Pearce (cricketer) =

Australian cricketer (1941–1999)

Donald Rex Pearce
Personal information
- Born: 21 February 1941; Ulverstone, Tasmania, Australia
- Died: 13 February 1999 (aged 57); Burnie, Tasmania, Australia

Domestic team information
- Years: Team
- 1967-1969: Tasmania
- Source: Cricinfo, 13 March 2016

Don Pearce (21 February 1941 – 13 February 1999) was an Australian cricketer. He played two first-class matches for Tasmania between 1967 and 1969.

== See also ==
- List of Tasmanian representative cricketers
