= John W. Brown (set decorator) =

American art director

- Occupation: Set decorator
- Years active: 1967–1970

John W. Brown was a set decorator. He won an Oscar in the category Best Art Direction for the film Camelot.

== Selected filmography ==
- Camelot (1967)
