= See You at the Pillar =

1967 British film by Peter Bayliss

- Directed by: Peter Bayliss
- Written by: Peter Bayliss
- Produced by: Robert Fitchet
- Narrated by: Anthony Quayle
- Production company: Associated British Pathé
- Release date: 1967
- Running time: 17 minutes
- Country: United Kingdom
- Language: English

See You at the Pillar is a 1967 British short documentary film about Dublin directed and written by Peter Bayliss. Produced by Robert Fitchet, it was nominated for an Academy Award for Best Documentary Short.

== Synopsis ==
The film combines contemporary footage, folk music and quotations from past residents including George Bernard Shaw, Oscar Wilde and Brendan Behan. The film is narrated via a "conversation" between Anthony Quayle and Norman Rodway.

== Cast ==
- Anthony Quayle (narrator)
- Norman Rodway (narrator)

== Reception ==
In The Irish Times, "Pro-Quidnunc" called the film "lively and literate".
