= Cool Hand Luke (novel) =

1965 novel by Donn Pearce

- First edition (publ. Scribner)
- Author: Donn Pearce
- Publisher: Charles Scribner's Sons
- Publication date: January 1, 1965

Cool Hand Luke is a novel by Donn Pearce published in 1965. It was adapted into the 1967 Oscar-winning film Cool Hand Luke.

The story is told in a first-person narrative from the perspective of a convict in a central Florida prison. He works on a chain gang maintaining the berms of highways. He recounts the story of a "legendary" fellow inmate whose nickname is Cool Hand Luke.

The novel is based on Pearce's personal experiences while incarcerated with a Florida prison road gang.

== History ==
Donn Pearce was arrested for burglary and served two years at Raiford State Prison in central Florida, from 1949 to 1951, working hard labor on a road gang. At night, he began writing about the incidents he witnessed or heard. He also began reading such books as Faulkner's Sanctuary. According to Pearce, about a third of Cool Hand Luke is his own story, a third is based on the stories he heard while doing time at Raiford, and another third is pure fiction. In 1959, after gaining freedom, Pearce broke a leg in a motorcycle crash and, with free time available, began writing the novel, based on his prison notes and memories. After writing the first draft, he re-wrote it five times over a six-year period. He had trouble finding a publisher, until Fawcett Books finally agreed to publish the novel as a 'paperback original', paying Pearce $2,500. Scribners then published it as a hardback.

== Style ==
The prose style is unusual in that although there is dialogue, and all quotes are indented paragraphs, they are not encased in quotation marks.

The most oft-repeated quote from the film, "What we've got here is failure to communicate", never appeared in the novel. Pearce said the guards were "100% redneck", without multi-syllable vocabularies, who would never have said such an intellectually astute phrase."

== Reviews ==
A contemporary review in Kirkus Reviews called it "a kind of classic small tall story (in latrine language)".

== Adaptations ==
The novel was adapted to film in 1967, based on a screenplay by Pearce. It was nominated for an Academy Award for Best Adapted Screenplay.

Stage and screen actor Mark Hammer performed an audiobook rendition in 1991 for Recorded Books.

A stage adaption by Emma Reeves produced by Andrew Loudon and starring Marc Warren and Richard Brake, based on the novel, not the film, premiered at Aldwych Theatre in London in 2011.
