= Donn Pearce =

American writer

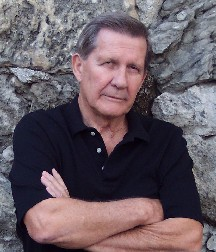
- Born: Donald Mills Pearce; September 28, 1928; Croydon, Pennsylvania, U.S.
- Died: July 25, 2017 (aged 88); Fort Lauderdale, Florida, U.S.
- Occupations: Writer; Journalist
- Writing career
- Period: 1965–2011
- Genres: Fiction, Non-fiction
- Notable works: Cool Hand Luke, Pier Head Jump, Dying in the Sun, Nobody Comes Back

Donn Pearce (September 28, 1928 – July 25, 2017) was an American author and journalist best known for the novel and screenplay Cool Hand Luke.

== Early life ==
Born Donald Mills Pearce in a suburb of Philadelphia, Pearce left home at 15. He attempted to join the United States Merchant Marine at 16, but was turned away due to his age. He lied about his age, registered for the draft, and was inducted into the United States Army in 1944. Frustrated by rules he considered unnecessary, he went AWOL, then three days later thought better of it and turned himself in to a Navy shore patrolman. His sentence was 30 days in the stockade. He served three days of his sentence, then was transferred to a combat infantry unit. Anticipating being sent to the front (this was during World War II), he wrote his mother a letter. She contacted the Army, informed them of his true age, and he was thrown out of the Army. By this time, he was old enough to join the Merchant Marine.

The Merchant Marine took him to Venice when he was 18, to Spain, Denmark, France, Portugal, and Bombay. Postwar Europe had a thriving black market, and Pearce became involved in counterfeiting American money. He attempted to pass some counterfeit bills to a police officer in Marseille, and was arrested, tried, and imprisoned. Assigned to a work detail outside the prison grounds, Pearce escaped, making his way to the Italian border. The French officials had taken his seaman's papers, so he forged new ones and signed them on a ship to Canada. He crossed from Canada into the United States, where he began a new career: burglary.

He became a safecracker, and in 1949, at age 20, he was arrested for burglary. He served two years in the Florida Department of Corrections chain gangs.

== Career ==
In 1965, Scribner's published his first novel, Cool Hand Luke, and with screenwriter Frank Pierson he went on to co-write the Academy Award–nominated screenplay for the 1967 film. The film starred Paul Newman, and Pearce made a cameo appearance as a convict named Sailor.

In 1966, Pearce appeared as himself on the March 21, 1966 episode of the CBS television game show To Tell the Truth, receiving two of four possible votes.

His other books include Pier Head Jump (1972) and Dying in the Sun (1974). During the 1970s and early 1980s, he was a freelance journalist, contributing to magazines such as Playboy and Esquire. In 2005, he published a fourth book, Nobody Comes Back, a novel about the Battle of the Bulge, which received an excellent review from Malcolm Jones in the 21 February 2005 edition of Newsweek. In 2011, a dramatization of Cool Hand Luke played on London's West Side, and the novel was reissued in the UK.

== Personal life ==
In his later life, Pearce lived and wrote in Fort Lauderdale, Florida.
