= Pioneer Valley =

Massachusetts portion of the Connecticut River Valley, US

Coordinates: 42.300°N 72.600°W

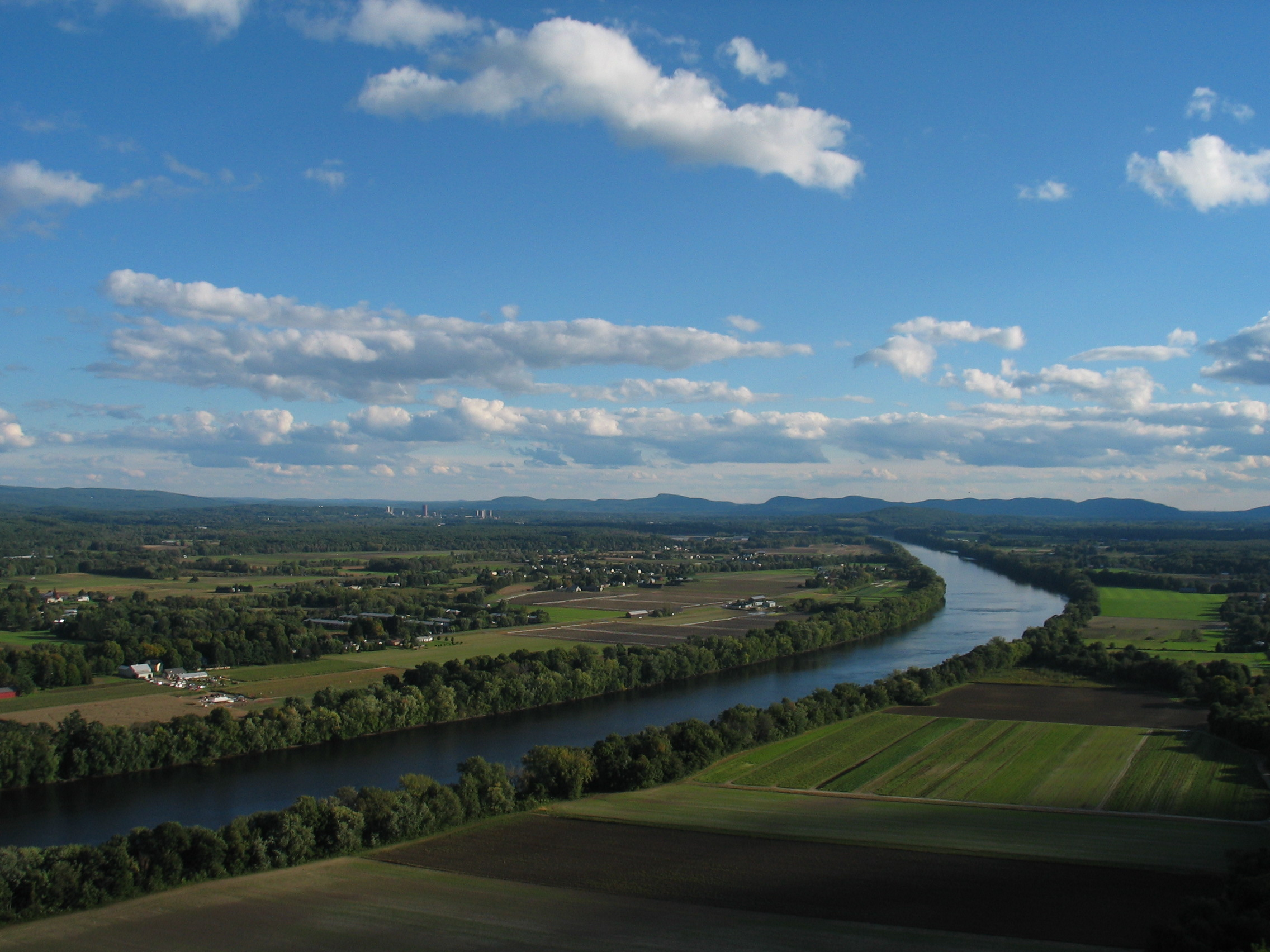
The Connecticut River, looking southward over Sunderland from Deerfield.

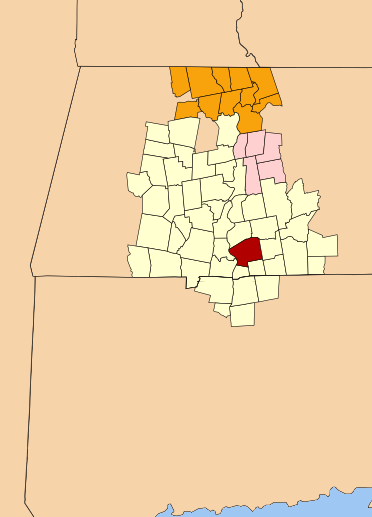
Map of the towns of the valley, showing U.S. census New England City and Town Area micropolitan districts of Amherst (in pink) and Greenfield (in orange), and the Springfield metropolitan NECTA (in yellow). The city of Springfield is highlighted in red.

The Pioneer Valley is the colloquial and promotional name for the portion of the Connecticut River Valley that is in Massachusetts in the United States. It is generally taken to comprise the three counties of Hampden, Hampshire, and Franklin. The lower Pioneer Valley corresponds to the Springfield, Massachusetts metropolitan area, the region's urban center, and the seat of Hampden County. The upper Pioneer Valley region includes the smaller cities of Northampton and Greenfield, the county seats of Hampshire and Franklin counties, respectively. The region is also known by the name Pocumtuck Valley after the indigenous people who lived there.

Historically the northern part of the Valley was an agricultural region, known for growing Connecticut shade tobacco and other specialty crops like Hadley asparagus; however, since the late nineteenth century its economy has become increasingly a knowledge economy, due to the prominence of the Five Colleges in Hampshire County. Similarly the Springfield–Chicopee–Holyoke economies transformed from volume producers of goods such as paper and armaments, into a combination of specialized manufacturing and distribution services for Boston and New York City.

Many of the cities and towns include areas of forests, and Springfield itself, which in the early twentieth century was nicknamed "The City in a Forest," features nature within its city limits and over 12% parkland. The Pioneer Valley is known for its scenery and as a vacation destination. The Holyoke Range, Mount Tom Range, and numerous rolling hills, bluffs, and meadows feature extravagant homes from the Gilded Age, many of which surround New England's longest and largest river, the Connecticut River, which flows through the region.

The name "Pioneer Valley" originates in the twentieth century with travel writers using it in the 1920s and 1930s to designate the region. In 1939 the Pioneer Valley Association was formed to promote the region using that name.

== Tourist destination ==
The Pioneer Valley has played host to tourists for much of its history. Popular tourist destinations include the city of Springfield, college towns, like Northampton and Amherst; Six Flags New England; cultural and historical sites, such as the Emily Dickinson House, the Springfield Armory and the Basketball Hall of Fame; and ski resorts including Berkshire East. Seasonal fairs and festivals such as The Big E, the annual state fair in West Springfield; and Bright Nights at Springfield's Forest Park, an elaborate, high-tech lighting display during the holiday season, also draw in millions of visitors.

== Geology ==
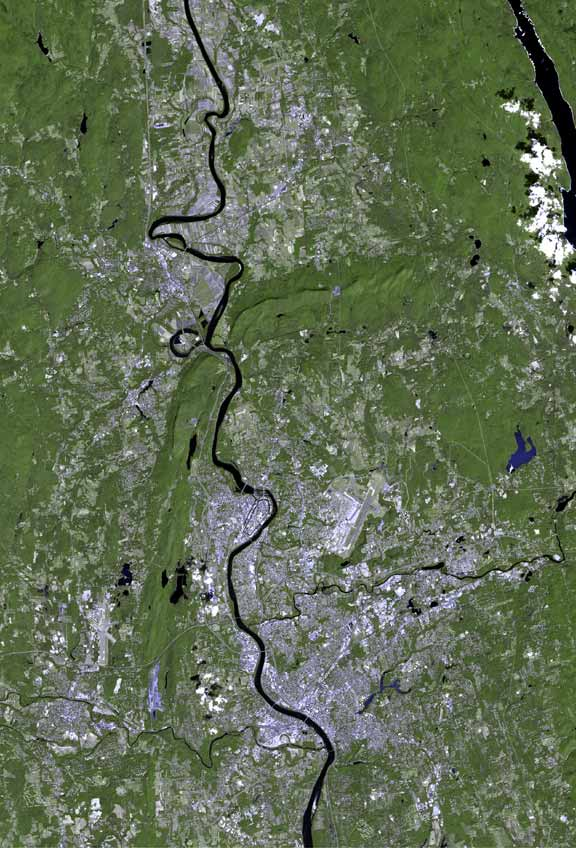
The Pioneer Valley from space, with Springfield toward the bottom of the photo and Northampton-Amherst toward the top.

The Pioneer Valley includes approximately half of the southern Connecticut River Valley—an ancient rift valley created by the breakup of the supercontinent Pangea along the Mid-Atlantic Ridge during the Triassic and Jurassic periods of the Mesozoic Era. The Connecticut River has been flowing through the valley for millions of years and was naturally dammed to form glacial lake Hitchcock during the last ice age.

According to King's Handbook of Springfield, by Moses King, the Pioneer Valley "is not an ordinary river channel; it is, in fact, a trough between two systems of mountains. To the west lie the worn-down remnants of the once lofty Berkshire Mountains; on the east, the yet more degraded ridges which constitute what we may call the Eastern Massachusetts set of mountain ridges. These rocks now form many sharp hills and mountains in the Valley. During the Triassic time, Massachusetts's portion of the Connecticut River Valley formed a shallow arm of the sea," leaving deposits that enriched the Pioneer Valley's inordinately fertile soil.

Geologically interesting parts of the Valley are the basalt flows and dinosaur tracks in South Hadley and Holyoke, Massachusetts, a chain of basaltic traprock ridges known as Metacomet Ridge along the ancient tectonic rift including the Mount Holyoke and Mount Tom ranges, layers of rock deposit laid down by the river, and varves and deltas deposited by Lake Hitchcock during the Pleistocene.

== Political geography ==
The region known as the Pioneer Valley constitutes Massachusetts's portion of the fertile Connecticut River Valley and the hill and mountain towns to its east and west. The following three counties—from north to south, and each with a different character—encompass the Pioneer Valley:

=== Franklin County ===
Franklin County is the most rural county in Massachusetts and thus reminiscent of southern Vermont, which it borders. Greenfield is its largest municipality, a small city frequently used as a gateway to the region's many outdoor pursuits. The county offers downhill skiing at resorts such as Berkshire East, white-water rafting, zip-lining, hiking, kayaking, and other outdoor pursuits. In addition, Franklin County contains many rustic, former mill towns. Many of these have become quaint and scenic since the decline of the mills (e.g., Turners Falls). Massachusetts's Routes 2 and 2A, which run through Franklin County, feature many antique stores.

=== Hampshire County ===
Hampshire County is the home to five colleges and universities that cooperate with each other and are known collectively as the Five Colleges. They are UMass Amherst, Amherst, Mount Holyoke, Smith, and Hampshire. Each of these liberal arts colleges and universities contribute to Hampshire County's college town atmosphere, particularly in the significant college towns of Northampton and Amherst. Much of Hampshire County's cultural activity, nightlife, and musical venues are concentrated in these two small municipalities that are separated by a mere seven miles. While the college towns in Hampshire County are known for their liberal political values and their embrace of alternative cultures and lifestyles, many of the county's outlying towns preserve their traditional, bucolic characters. In terms of political demographics, Hampshire County is one of the more liberal areas in the United States in both voter registration and election returns.

=== Hampden County ===
Hampden County is the most highly urbanized county in Western Massachusetts; however, its environs have long been described as rus in urbe—cities amidst forests. Springfield, Massachusetts—the "shire town" for which Hampden County was initially carved out of Hampshire County in 1814—is located in southern Hampden County, at a natural crossroads where three significant rivers flow into Connecticut River (the Westfield, the Chicopee, and the Mill). Springfield's history is long, illustrious, and well-chronicled. It was one of the United States' most important precision manufacturing and defense centers until its relatively recent deindustrialization, which was catalyzed by the government's controversial closure of the Springfield Armory during the Vietnam War. (In 1777, General George Washington and Henry Knox personally selected that site for the United States' Federal Arsenal.) After nearly 30 years of decline, Springfield has since about 2006 experienced a cultural and economic resurgence, catalyzed by billions of dollars in private and public investment, including the funded construction of the United States' first high-speed bullet-train, known as the Knowledge Corridor intercity rail line as well as a sharp decreases in crime and new festivals that have renewed the city's traditionally robust civic pride. Springfield itself features international tourist attractions like the Basketball Hall of Fame and the Springfield Armory National Historic Site; it also features the Dr. Seuss Memorial, Augustus Saint Gaudens's outdoor masterpiece, The Puritan, and five world-class art, science, and history museums at the Quadrangle. Forest Park, a city park of 745 acres (301 ha) designed following the principles of Frederick Law Olmsted, who is most famous for designing New York City's Central Park, is comparably diverse and ornate. The city's economic base is also diverse, featuring Massachusetts's wealthiest Fortune 100 company, MassMutual Insurance, as well as numerous universities and hospitals. Springfield features thousands of Victorian era Painted Lady mansions (like San Francisco's), e.g., in the McKnight Historic District. In addition to the Connecticut River, Springfield features Watershops Pond, Porter Lake, and the Mill River.

Less than two miles south of Springfield, Six Flags New England amusement park is located in suburban Agawam; and one mile west of Springfield, The Big E—the collective state fairgrounds of all six New England States—is located in West Springfield. North of Springfield, the U.S. Westover Air Force Base is located in the resurgent, former industrial city of Chicopee. The City of Chicopee features the confluence of the fast-moving Chicopee River and the meandering Connecticut River. The Chicopee River, although only 18.0 miles long, has the largest water basin in Massachusetts—and along the Connecticut River—at 741 square miles. Across from Chicopee, on the west side of the Connecticut River, the Holyoke Mall at Ingleside is one of the largest malls in New England. In addition to the mall, Holyoke is home to the Mount Tom Range of mountains, the Holyoke Canal System, and the Volleyball Hall of Fame. (The sport of volleyball was invented in Holyoke in 1895.)

The city of Westfield features Westfield State University, founded by renowned education reformer Horace Mann. Near to Westfield—approximately 15 miles west of Springfield—numerous outdoor opportunities are available, such as alpine skiing at Blandford Ski Area and the United States's oldest white-water rafting races on the 78.1 mile Westfield River, the longest Connecticut River tributary in Massachusetts.

The international airport that serves Hampden County, and the Pioneer Valley in general, is Bradley International Airport, which is located 12 miles south of Springfield in the town of Windsor Locks, Connecticut, land that formerly belonged to Springfield.

== Demographics ==
=== Ethnicity ===
The Pioneer Valley is a highly diverse place. Springfield is majority black, Latino and people of color. Currently, the Pioneer Valley's ethnic and racial diversity varies greatly from city to town. Predominantly British until the nineteenth century, and then European-American in the late nineteenth and twentieth centuries, as of the 2010 census, the region features a rapidly growing Hispanic population in nearly all urban areas. This influx includes large numbers of Puerto Ricans. Among the European-American community, the Pioneer Valley's population reflects the British Isles background of its original settlers and the immigrant populations that settled it during the late-nineteenth century, including large numbers of residents with Irish, Italian, Polish, Portuguese, French Canadian, and Greek backgrounds. As of 2011, Springfield is home to a particularly large number of Vietnamese immigrants. Also, as of 2011, Russian and Ukrainian immigrants are increasing in Springfield, West Springfield, Westfield, and other communities.

=== LGBT population ===
According to the 2010 census, the Pioneer Valley features one of the highest per capita lesbian, gay, bisexual, and transgender (LGBT) populations in the United States. Indeed, according to the U.S. Census Bureau's 2010 census statistics, Springfield was ranked one of the Top 10 gay cities in the United States. The 2010 census figures indicate the number of same-sex households per thousand. Springfield ranked No. 10, with 5.69 same-sex couples per thousand. In January 2010, the national LGBT magazine The Advocate rated Springfield No. 13 among its new "15 Gayest Secondary Cities in America," ahead of San Diego, California and Albuquerque, New Mexico. Springfield was the only Massachusetts city included on The Advocate's list.

The cities of Northampton and Springfield, in particular, feature vibrant LGBT communities. Unlike in other communities across the United States, LGBT residents have largely integrated into Northampton and Springfield, i.e. neither city features a gay ghetto. Generally, in the Pioneer Valley, LGBT people and straight people co-mingle in various bars, nightclubs, and cultural institutions. Still, both cities feature a robust and active LGBT nightlife – especially Northampton for lesbians, and Springfield for gay men. The college towns of Amherst and South Hadley also feature significant LGBT populations.

== Higher education institutions ==
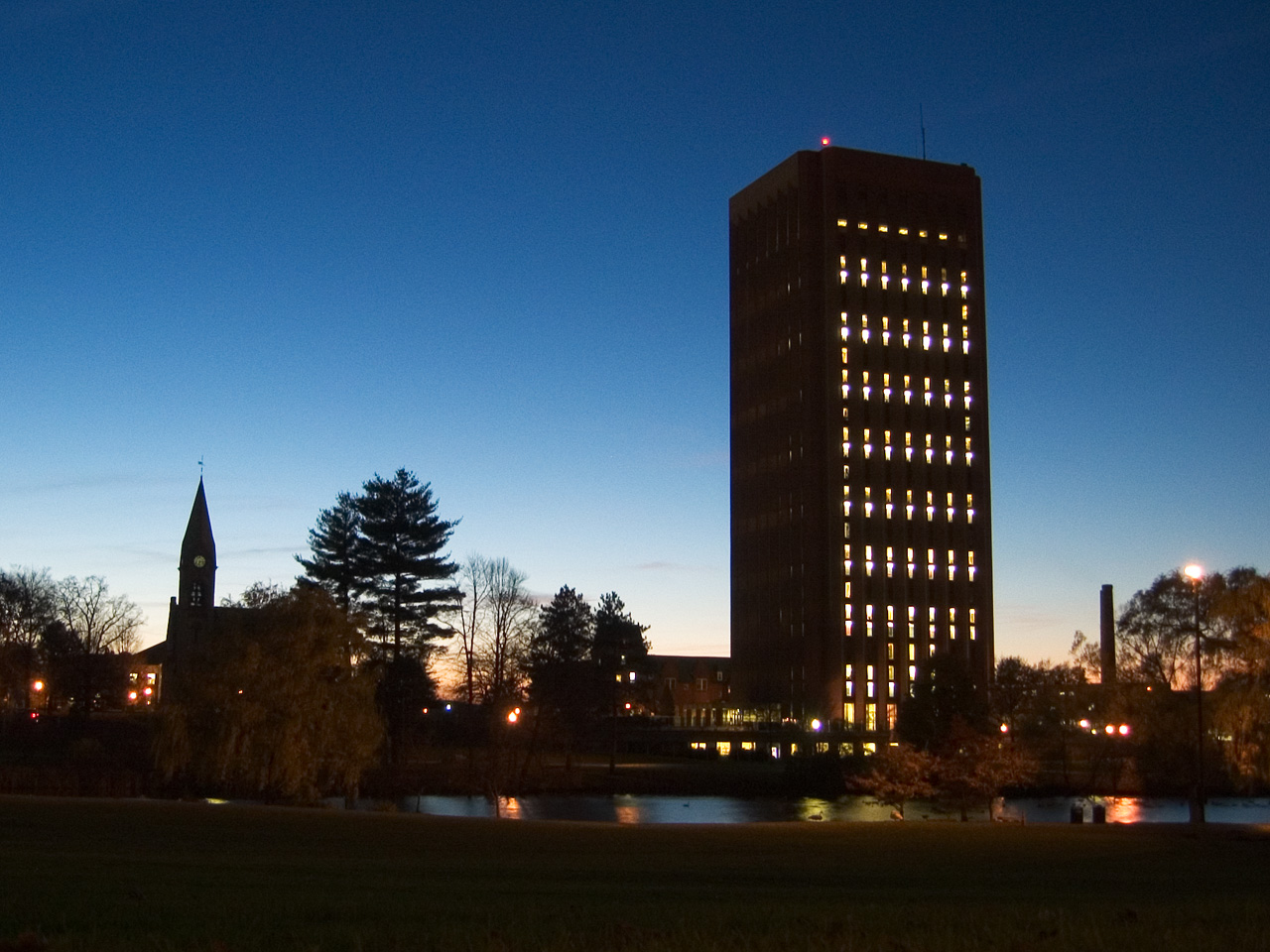
UMass Amherst campus at night, 18 miles north of Springfield

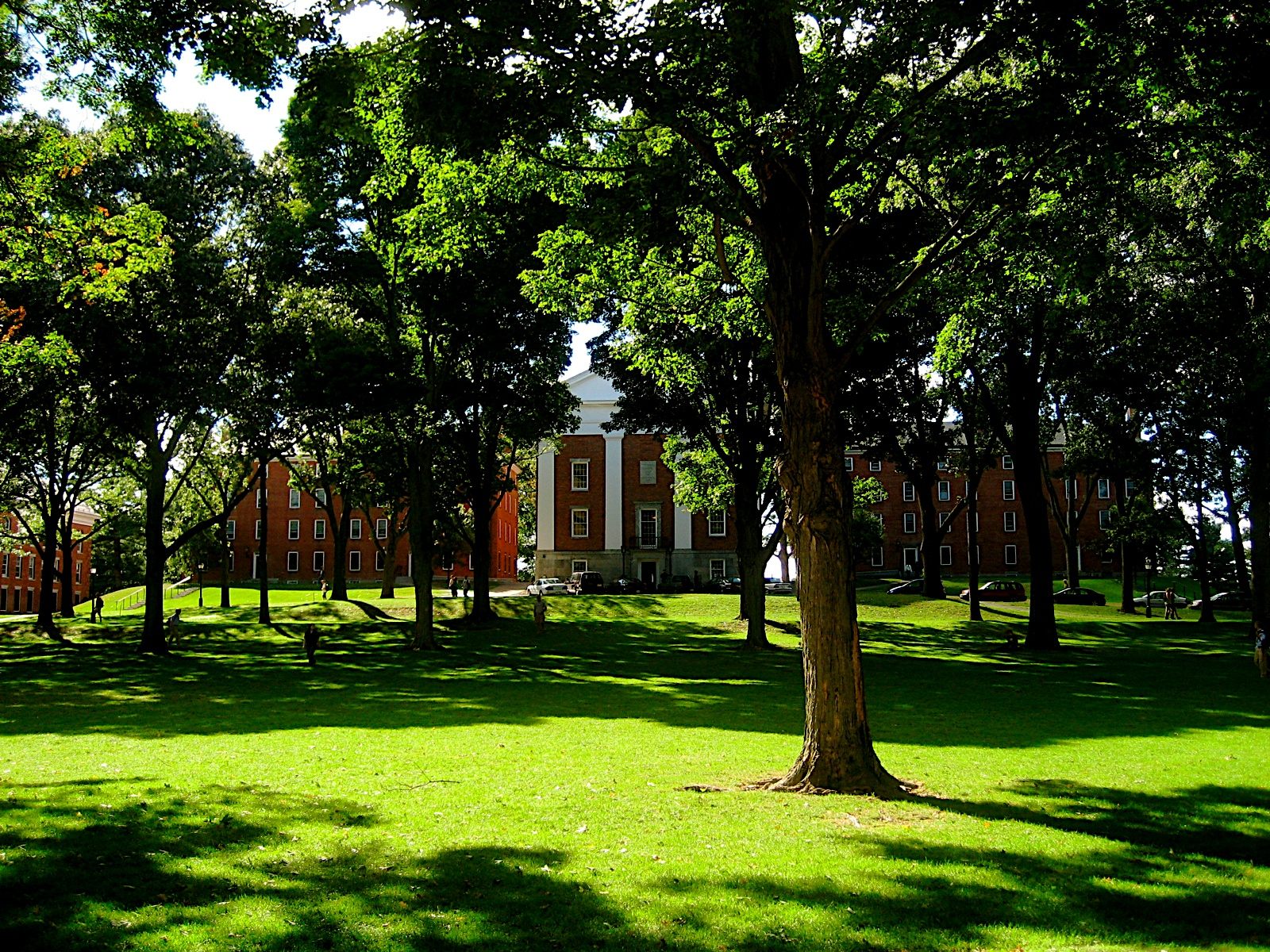
Amherst College's Main Quad, 17 miles north of Springfield

=== Five College Consortium ===
- Amherst College: Amherst
- Hampshire College: Amherst
- Mount Holyoke College: South Hadley
- Smith College: Northampton
- University of Massachusetts Amherst: Amherst

=== Metro Springfield Universities ===
- American International College: Springfield
- Bay Path University: Longmeadow
- Cambridge College: Springfield
- Elms College: Chicopee
- Springfield College: Springfield
- Western New England University: Springfield
- Westfield State University: Westfield

=== Graduate schools ===
- Conway School of Landscape Design: Conway and Easthampton
- Mount Holyoke College, Professional and Graduate Education: South Hadley
- Smith College School for Social Work: Northampton

=== Community colleges ===
- Greenfield Community College: Greenfield
- Holyoke Community College: Holyoke
- Springfield Technical Community College: Springfield

== History ==
Native American history in the Pioneer Valley stretches back thousands of years; its recorded history begins in 1635, when Roxbury magistrate William Pynchon commissioned land scouts John Cable and John Woodcock to look for the Connecticut River Valley's best site for both conducting trade and farming. The first 16 years of the history of the European settlement of the Pioneer Valley, before 1652, when Northampton, Massachusetts, was established, are coterminous with the history of Springfield, Massachusetts, as it was Pioneer Valley's only settlement. From 1633 to 1635, there had been three English settlements in the Connecticut River Valley: Wethersfield, Connecticut; Windsor, Connecticut; and the best situated of the three (because of its two rivers), Hartford, Connecticut. Cable and Woodcock continued northward until they came upon a spot that they agreed was the best situated of them all: modern-day Springfield, Massachusetts.

Springfield sits at a natural crossroads, at the confluence of four rivers: to the west, the 78.1 mile Westfield River, (the Connecticut River's longest tributary river in Massachusetts); in the middle, the 418.0 mile Connecticut River, then known as "The Great River"; and to the east two smaller rivers: the 18.0 mile Chicopee River, which featured the fast moving and the Connecticut River's largest water basin; and also, the Mill River, which would become very important approximately 150 years later after George Washington's foundation of the U.S. Armory at Springfield.

=== First settlement ===
Town	Date of separation from Springfield
Westfield	1669
Suffield (CT)	1682
Enfield (CT)	1683
Wilbraham	1763
West Springfield	1774
Ludlow	1774
Longmeadow	1783
Chicopee	1848

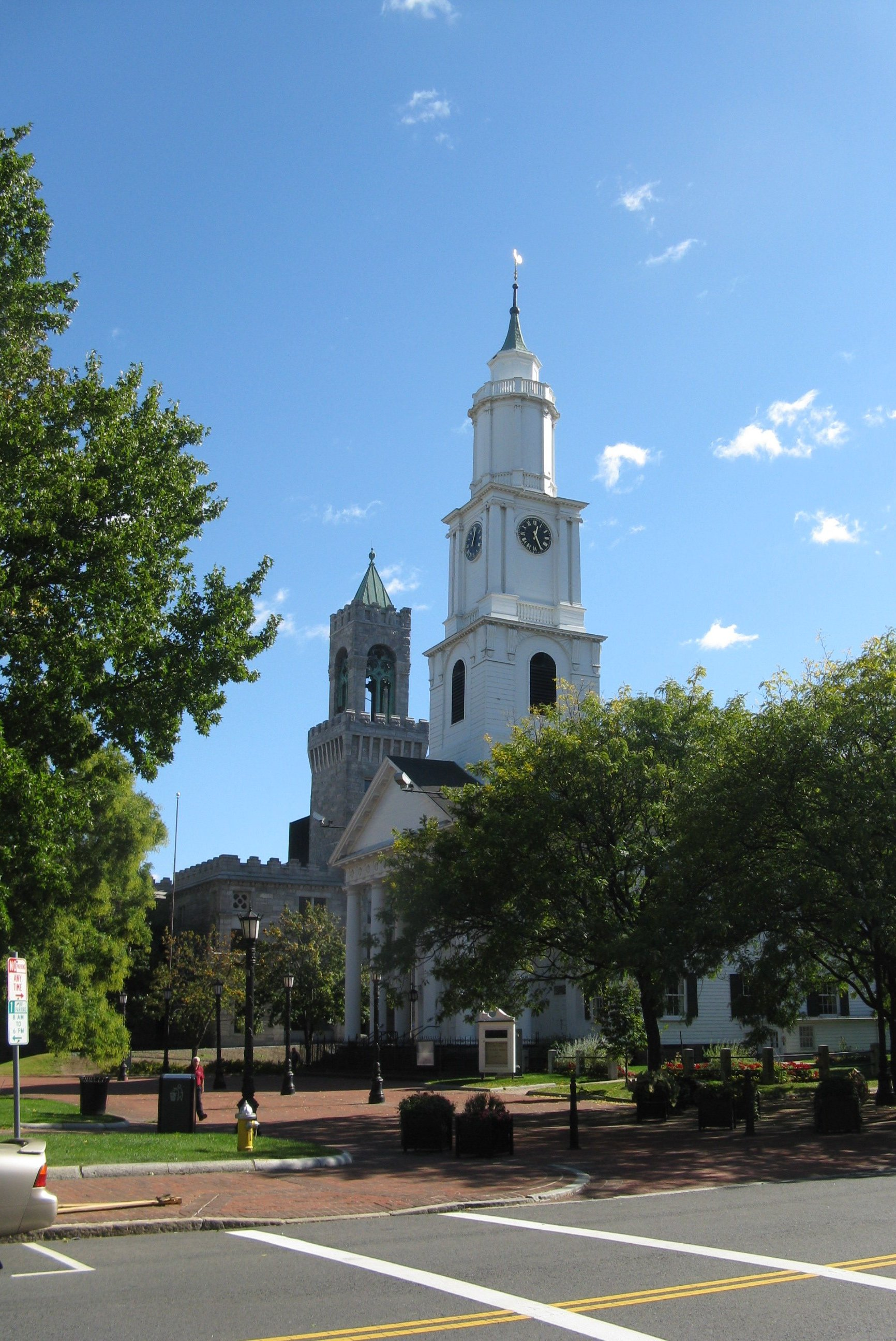
The First Church of Christ in Springfield's Court Square was the 20th parish gathered in the Massachusetts Bay Colony, in 1637.

At that time, on the western bank of the Connecticut River, the explorers found the Pocomtuc (or perhaps Nipmuck) Indian village of Agawam. Just south of the Westfield River, the colonists constructed a pre-fabricated house in what is present-day Agawam, Massachusetts.

In 1636, Pynchon led a settlement expedition with a larger group, including Henry Smith (Pynchon's son-in-law), Jehu Burr, William Blake, Matthew Mitchell, Edmund Wood, Thomas Ufford, and John Cable. Springfield was Massachusetts' first settlement for non-religious reasons, although many of its settlers were very religious, as indicated by their first article of incorporation, "Wee intend by God's grace, as soon as we can, with all convenient speede to procure some Godly and faithfull minister we purpose to joyne in church covenant, to walk in all the ways of Christ" In scouting Springfield, Cable, Woodcock, and Pynchon selected a spot just north of Enfield Falls, the first spot on the Connecticut River where all travelers must stop to negotiate a waterfall, 32 feet (9.8 m) in height, and then transship their cargoes from ocean-going vessels to smaller shallops. Pynchon's party purchased land on both sides of Connecticut River from 18 tribesman who lived at a palisade fort at the current site of Springfield's Longhill Street. The price paid was 18 hoes, 18 fathoms of wampum, 18 coats, 18 hatchets and 18 knives. Originally, in 1636, the English settlement was named Agawam Plantation. By founding "Agawam" in its particular location, Pynchon essentially forced all northerly river trade to move through his town.

After warnings from the Natives about the Connecticut River's west side being prone to flooding, most Springfield settlers moved to the east side of the river, which was slightly less advantageous for farming because of its prominent bluffs and hills. The initial land grants to English families were made there in what is today Springfield's Metro Center, along what is today Main Street. Long, narrow plots of farmland were created, extending outward from the river. In addition, more distant forested "wood lots" were offered. The original, main profit-generating industry for Springfield was trade with the Indians for beaver skins, which were then exported around the colonial world.

==== Choosing Massachusetts ====
In 1640 and 1641, two events took place that forever changed the political boundaries of the Connecticut River Valley. From its founding until that time, Springfield had been administered by Connecticut, along with Connecticut's three other settlements—at Wethersfield, Hartford, and Windsor. In the spring of 1640, grain was very scarce; cattle were dying of starvation. The nearby Connecticut Colony settlements gave power to William Pynchon to buy corn for all four English settlements, (Springfield's natives were, by far, the most congenial to the English.) If the Natives would not sell their corn at market prices, then Pynchon was authorized to offer more money. The Natives refused to sell their corn at market prices, and then later refused to sell it at "reasonable" prices. Pynchon refused to buy it, believing it best not to broadcast the English colonists' weaknesses, and also wanting to keep market values steady.

Leading citizens of (what would become) Hartford were furious with Pynchon for not purchasing any grain. With Windsor's and Wethersfield's consent, the three southerly settlements commissioned the famed Native American-conqueror Captain John Mason to travel to Springfield with "money in one hand and a sword in the other." On reaching (what would become) Springfield, Mason intimidated the local Natives with war if they did not sell their corn at a "reasonable price." The Natives capitulated and ultimately sold the colonists corn. Pynchon, an avowed "man of peace," believed in negotiation with the Natives (and thus, quickly made a fortune), whereas Mason—a hero of the Pequot Wars and conqueror of Connecticut—believed in subduing Natives by force if necessary. This philosophical difference led to Mason using "hard words" against Pynchon. Pynchon's settlement, however, agreed with him, and his philosophy, and that same year, voted to separate from the Connecticut Colony and be annexed by the Massachusetts Bay Colony. When the dust finally settled, William Pynchon was named magistrate of Agawam by the Massachusetts Bay Colony and, in honor of him, the settlement was renamed Springfield after the village of Springfield near Chelmsford, Essex in England, where Pynchon was born and raised. For decades, Springfield—which, at the time, included modern-day Westfield—was the westernmost settlement in Massachusetts.

==== Witchcraft and the New World's first banned book ====
In 1645, 46 years before the Salem witch trials, Springfield experienced America's first accusations of witchcraft when Mary Parsons accused a widow named Marshfield, who had moved from Windsor to Springfield, with witchcraft—an offense then punishable by death. For this, Mary Parsons was found guilty of slander. In 1651, Mary Parsons was accused of witchcraft—specifically "divers devilish practices by witchcraft, to the hurt of Martha and Rebeckah Moxon," two daughters of Springfield's first minister—and also of murdering her own child. In turn, Mary Parsons then accused her own husband, Hugh Parsons, of witchcraft. At America's first witch trial, both Mary and Hugh Parsons were found not guilty of witchcraft for want of satisfactory evidence; however, Mary was found guilty of murdering her own child. For this, she was sentenced to death, but died in prison in 1651, before receiving her death sentence.

In 1650, William Pynchon became infamous for writing the New World's first banned book. In 1649, Pynchon found time to write a book, The Meritous Price of Our Redemption, a theological study that was published in London in 1650. Several copies made it back to the Massachusetts Bay Colony and its capital, Boston, which, this time reacted with rage to Pynchon rather than with support. For his critical attitude toward Massachusetts' Calvinist Puritanism, Pynchon was accused of heresy, and his book was burned on the Boston Common. Only four copies survived. By declaration of the Massachusetts General Court, in 1650, The Meritous Price of Our Redemption became the first-ever banned book in the New World. In 1651, Pynchon was accused of heresy by the Massachusetts General Court (at the same meeting of the Court where Springfielder Mary Parsons was sentenced to death in America's first witch trial). Thus he is the first author to have his work "banned in Boston". Standing to lose all of his land-holdings—the largest in the Connecticut River Valley—William Pynchon transferred ownership to his son, John, and then, in 1652, moved back to England with his friend, the Reverend Moxon.

William's son, John Pynchon, and his brother-in-law, Elizur Holyoke, quickly took on the settlement's leadership roles. They began moving Springfield away from the diminishing fur trade into agricultural pursuits, and also founded several new towns, including Northampton, Massachusetts.

== Transportation ==
From the late 1800s until around 1940, the Springfield Street Railway served much of the Pioneer Valley with its 208+ mile streetcar system, which connected Springfield with its various neighborhoods like Forest Park and Indian Orchard, nearby cities such as Chicopee, Westfield, Holyoke, Agawam, West Springfield, Ludlow, Longmeadow, East Longmeadow, Palmer, Monson, Wilbraham and Ware and even nearby regions like Worcester, Hartford and the Berkshires.

The Northern Pioneer Valley was similarly served by the Holyoke Street Railway and the closely affiliated Northampton Street Railway which together served their namesake cities along with South Hadley, Chicopee, Northampton, Amherst, Easthampton, Hadley and other nearby cities along with the Connecticut Valley Street Railway which also served Northampton, Amherst and Hadley as well as Greenfield, Turners Falls, Deerfield, Hatfield, Whately and other cities within and outside the valley. Smaller local street railways like the Shelburne Falls and Colrain Street Railway and an even smaller one in Conway operated in other parts of the valley.

The valley was at one point also served by the Central Massachusetts Railroad, with direct service from Amherst, Belchertown, Hadley, Northampton and Williamsburg to Ware, Rutland, Holden, West Boylston, Berlin, Hudson/Marlborough, Sudbury, Waltham, Wayland, Weston, Belmont, Cambridge, Somerville and Boston. Much of this route has been preserved as the Mass Central Rail Trail, though it is unclear whether this constitutes Railbanking.

Today, bus transportation is offered in various parts of the valley by the Pioneer Valley Transit Authority and the Franklin Regional Transit Authority.

Passenger rail service on the Vermonter and, since 2019, the Valley Flyer Amtrak train is available from John W. Olver Transit Center in Greenfield, Union Station in Northampton, Holyoke, and Springfield Union Station, the latter of which is also served by the Hartford Line.

A new state-supported Amtrak service that will connect the Valley with Pittsfield, Worcester, and Boston known as East-West Passenger Rail is in the development phase and has received some initial funding.

Another similar project, called Northern Tier Passenger Rail which would reactivate the former Fitchburg Railroad and reconnect the norther Pioneer Valley with Fitchburg, Gardner, North Adams, Orange, Pittsfield, Albany and the cities along the existing MBTA Fitchburg Line in Greater Boston has also been proposed and studied, and is now awaiting further action and funding following the release of MassDOT's final report in 2024.

== Northampton ==
=== Early settlement ===
The area now called Northampton was once known as Norwottuck, or Nonotuck, meaning "the midst of the river" by its original Pocumtuc inhabitants. According to various accounts, Northampton was named by John King (1629–1703), one of its original settlers, or possibly in his honor, since it is supposed that he came to Massachusetts from Northampton, England.

The Pocumtuc confederacy occupied the Connecticut River Valley, from what is now southern Vermont and New Hampshire into northern Connecticut. The Pocumtuc tribes were Algonquian, and traditionally allied with the Mahican confederacy to the west. By 1606, an ongoing struggle between the Mahican and Iroquois confederacies led to direct attacks on the Pocumtuc by the Iroquoian Mohawk nation. The Mahican confederacy had been defeated by 1628, limiting Pocumtuc access to trade routes to the west. The area suffered a major smallpox epidemic in the 1630s, following the arrival of Dutch traders in the Hudson Valley and English settlers in the Massachusetts Bay Colony during the previous two decades. It was in this context that the land making up the bulk of modern Northampton was sold to settlers from Springfield, Massachusetts, in 1653, and settled the following year. The situation in the region further deteriorated when the Mohawk escalated hostilities against the Pocumtuc confederacy and other Algonquian tribes after 1655, forcing many of the plague-devastated Algonquian groups into defensive mergers. This coincided with a souring of relations between the Wampanoag and the Massachusetts Bay colonists, eventually leading to the expanded Algonquian alliance which took part in King Philip's War.

=== The partition of Northampton ===
Northampton's territory would be enlarged beyond the original settlement, but later portions would be carved up into separate cities, towns, and municipalities. Southampton, for example, was incorporated in 1775, and included parts of the territories of modern Montgomery (which was itself incorporated in 1780) and Easthampton. Westhampton was incorporated in 1778, and Easthampton in 1809. Formerly, a section of Northampton called Smith's Ferry was separated from the rest of the town by the boundaries of Easthampton. The shortest path to downtown was on a road near the Connecticut River oxbow, which was subject to frequent flooding. Smith's Ferry was ceded to Holyoke, Massachusetts, in 1909.

== Deerfield ==
Deerfield was the northwesternmost outpost of New England settlement for several decades during the late seventeenth and early eighteenth centuries. It occupies a fertile portion of the Connecticut River Valley and was vulnerable to attack because of its position near the Berkshire Mountains. For these reasons it became the site of several Anglo-French and Indian skirmishes during its early history, as well as intertribal warfare.

At the time of the English colonists' arrival, the Deerfield area was inhabited by the Algonquian-speaking Pocumtuck nation, with a major village by the same name. First settled by English colonists in 1673, Deerfield was incorporated in 1677. Settlement was the result of a court case in which the government in Boston agreed to return some of the land of the town of Dedham to Native American control, and allowed some of Dedham's residents to acquire land in the new township of Pocumtuck. To obtain this land, their agent John Plympton signed a treaty with some Pocumtuck men, including one named Chaulk. He had no authority to deed the land to the colonists, and appeared to have only a rough idea of what he was signing. Native Americans and English had quite differing ideas about property and land use, which contributed to their conflicts, along with competition for resources.

The settlers expelled the Pocumtuck tribe by force, who in turn sought French protection from colonists in Canada. At the Battle of Bloody Brook on September 18, 1675, the dispossessed Indians destroyed a small force under the command of Captain Thomas Lathrop before being driven off by reinforcements. Colonial casualties numbered about sixty. In retaliation, at dawn on May 19, 1676, Captain William Turner led an army of settlers in a surprise attack on Peskeompskut, in present-day Montague, then a traditional native gathering place. They killed 200 natives, mostly women and children. When the men of the tribe returned, they routed Turner, who died of a mortal wound at Green River.

On February 29, 1704, during Queen Anne's War, joint French and Indian forces attacked the town in what has become known as the 1704 Raid on Deerfield. Under the command of Jean-Baptiste Hertel de Rouville were 47 Canadiens and 200 Abenaki, Kanienkehaka and Wyandot, as well as a few Pocumtuck. They struck at dawn, razing Deerfield and killing 56 colonists, including 22 men, 9 women, and 25 children. They took as captives 109 survivors, including women and children, and "carried" them away on a months-long trek to Quebec. Many died along the way or were killed when they could not keep up.

Deerfield and other communities collected funds to ransom the captives, and negotiations were conducted between colonial governments. When New England released the French pirate, Canada arranged redemption of numerous Deerfield people, among them the minister John Williams. He wrote a captivity narrative about his experience, which was published in 1707 and became well known. Because of losses to war and disease, the Mohawk and other tribes often adopted younger captives into their tribes. Such was the case with Williams' daughter Eunice, eight years old when captured. She became thoroughly assimilated, at age 16 marrying a Mohawk man. Most of the Deerfield captives eventually returned to New England. During this period, other captives remained by choice in French and Native communities such as Kahnawake for the rest of their lives.

As the frontier moved north, Deerfield became another colonial town with an unquiet early history. In 1753 Greenfield was set off and incorporated. During the early nineteenth century, Deerfield's role in agricultural production of the Northeast declined. It was overtaken by the rapid development of the Midwestern United States into the nation's breadbasket, with transportation to eastern markets and New York City enhanced by construction of the Erie Canal.

During the Colonial Revival Movement of the late nineteenth century, Deerfield citizens rediscovered the town's past. Residents founded the Pocumtuck Valley Memorial Association in 1870, and erected monuments to commemorate various events, including the Bloody Brook and 1704 attacks. In 1890, Charlotte Alice Baker returned to Deerfield to restore her family home, the Frary House. Assisted by the Boston architectural firm of Shepley, Rutan & Coolidge, her project was one of the first in historic preservation in western Massachusetts. Today, tourism is the town's principal industry. Historic Deerfield, a National Historic Landmark district with eleven house museums and a regional museum and visitors' center, and the Yankee Candle Company are major attractions.

An account of the town's early history was written by local historian George Sheldon and published in the late nineteenth century. By this time, South Deerfield and other New England villages were already absorbing a new wave of Eastern European immigration, particularly from Poland. The new people influenced Deerfield's demographics and culture. They were mostly Catholic peasants, who built their own churches and first worked as laborers, forming a community later known as Old Polonia. Later twentieth-century immigrants from Poland tended to be more educated, but settled in the larger cities. Immigrants in smaller communities followed different paths, and their descendants often moved to cities for more opportunities.

== Greenfield ==
Pocumtuck Indians first settled and originally inhabited the Greenfield area. Native American artifacts found in the area have been dated as originating between 7,000 and 9,000 years BC. The Pocumtucks planted field crops and fished the rivers, but were wiped out as a tribe by the Mohawks in 1664. Thereafter, the newly unoccupied area - being the eastern terminus of the Mohawk Trail, a principal route for Native American trade traveling west into New York - was colonized by the English in 1686 as part of Deerfield. In 1753, Greenfield was set off from Deerfield and incorporated as a separate town, named for the Green River.

In 1795, the South Hadley Canal opened, allowing boats to bypass the South Hadley falls and reach Greenfield via the Connecticut River. Located at the confluence of the Deerfield and Green rivers, and not far from where they merge into the Connecticut River, Greenfield developed into a trade center. It was designated county seat when Franklin County was created from Hampshire County in 1811. Falls provided water power for industry, and Greenfield grew into a prosperous mill town.

== Culture ==
=== Hampshire County ===
Residents benefit from a rich cultural array of fine arts, performances and notable architecture in college towns and in Springfield. According to the 2010 census, per capita, Northampton has the highest concentration of lesbians in the United States, and perhaps the world. Hampshire County is referred to as the "Valley full o' Pioneer ... in the sleepy west of the woody east", by the Pixies in their song "U-Mass".

=== Springfield ===
As of 2011, Springfield's most famous cultural contribution worldwide is basketball, currently the world's 2nd most popular sport. That said, the "City of Progress" produced three other innovations, not nearly as well publicized, but which have proven to have proven to be just as significant, if not more so, to the world at large. In 1892–93, the first, functional, American gasoline-powered car was produced at the Stacy Building in Springfield by the Duryea Brothers. The Duryea's car also won the world's first automobile race in 1895 in Chicago. In 1901, the first motorcycle company in the world was "Indian", produced in Springfield; in 1905, the first modern fire engines in the world were produced by Knox Automobile (which made Springfield's fire department the first modern fire department in the world;), and the first commercial radio station in the U.S., WBZ, was broadcast from Springfield in 1921.

Of national importance, Springfield featured the United States' first witch trial in 1646—decades before the Salem Witch Trials; and a few years later in 1650, a Springfielder wrote the New World's first banned book, The Meritorious Price of Our Redemption by William Pynchon. Pynchon was the founder of the city of Springfield. His book, expressing views contrary to Puritan Calvinist doctrine, caused him to be brought before the high court in Boston and accused of heresy. He later to return to England.

In Springfield, in 1860, Milton Bradley invented and produced his popular parlor games, including the still popular The Game of Life. Also in Springfield, Dr. Seuss grew up, and wrote several of the works for which he is now best known, (e.g. And to Think That I Saw It on Mulberry Street.) Psychiatrist and LSD activist Timothy Leary—the man who influenced a generations to "turn on, tune in, drop out"—was born and educated in Springfield. Earlier, from 1846 to 1850, John Brown, the famed abolitionist, lived in Springfield, where he met, for the first time the national leaders of the abolition movement like Frederick Douglass and Sojourner Truth. In Springfield, in response to the Fugitive Slave Act, John Brown founded his first militant anti-slavery organization, The League of Gileadites. Brown's years in Springfield have often been called his "transformative years."

To the extent that military history adds to a place's culture, Springfield's history is notably rich, beginning with the 1675 Attack on Springfield during King Philip's War. Later, events such as George Washington's and Henry Knox's founding of the Springfield Armory atop a bluff in the town made Springfield one of the U.S. military's most important sites for centuries. Shays's Rebellion, which led directly to the U.S. Constitution, occurred at the Armory ten years after Washington's founding of it—and also forced him to come out of retirement.

As regards literary works, the world's first American-English dictionary was published in Springfield in 1806, and is still published in the city by Merriam Webster. Also, the first comprehensive, major United States history book was written by Springfielder George Bancroft in 1830.

To the extent that cultural contributions comprise invention, innovation, and progress, Springfield has been, historically, one of the nation's most innovative cities. In 1819, inventor Thomas Blanchard invented the lathe in Springfield, which would catalyze manufacturing developments now known the world over as interchangeable parts and the assembly line. In 1825, Blanchard also built the first American car, a "horseless carriage," which was powered by steam. In 1844, inventor Charles Goodyear perfected and patented his process for making vulcanized rubber in Springfield—as of 2011, as it has been for many years previous, Goodyear's name is known the world over for rubber production. In 1868, inventor Margaret E. Knight invented a machine for folding and gluing flat-bottomed paper bags.

Other major cultural contributions from Springfield include the first U.S. postcard in 1873; the first American, national horse show in 1853; the first American dog show—and even the first American friction match in 1834.

=== Art and museums ===
Valley residents also have a love of arts, both visual and performing, as demonstrated by numerous art galleries, countless theaters and performances, the residencies of children's authors Dr. Seuss, Eric Carle in the valley, and the Eric Carle Museum of Picture Book Art in Amherst.

Springfield's Quadrangle features five museums, including two art museums, two history museums, and one science museum. Springfield's Science Museum features the United States' first planetarium. Interspersed among the five museums is the sculptural Dr. Seuss Memorial garden, which recreates the Springfield author's whimsical characters in bronze.

In Springfield, Springfield Symphony Hall serves as the major focal point for classical music, Broadway tours, concerts and stand-up comedy shows in the Valley. Symphony Hall was built in 1911–13, and its ornamentation is a spectacle in itself. The major playhouse in Springfield is CityStage, which features an eclectic mix of entertainment. Both venues are managed by Springfield Performing Arts Development Corporation.

=== Local media ===
- Amherst Bulletin
- Daily Hampshire Gazette
- Greenfield Recorder
- The Republican
- The Valley Advocate, local arts & entertainment newspaper
- The Valley Arts Newsletter, a weekly newsletter with listings for art shows & events, craft fairs & pop-ups, calls for artists, art classes, studio space, and art/ist crowdfunding
- The Valley Post
- Predvestnik, the Russian language newspaper of Pioneer Valley (ceased publication April 2008)

=== Independent bookstores ===
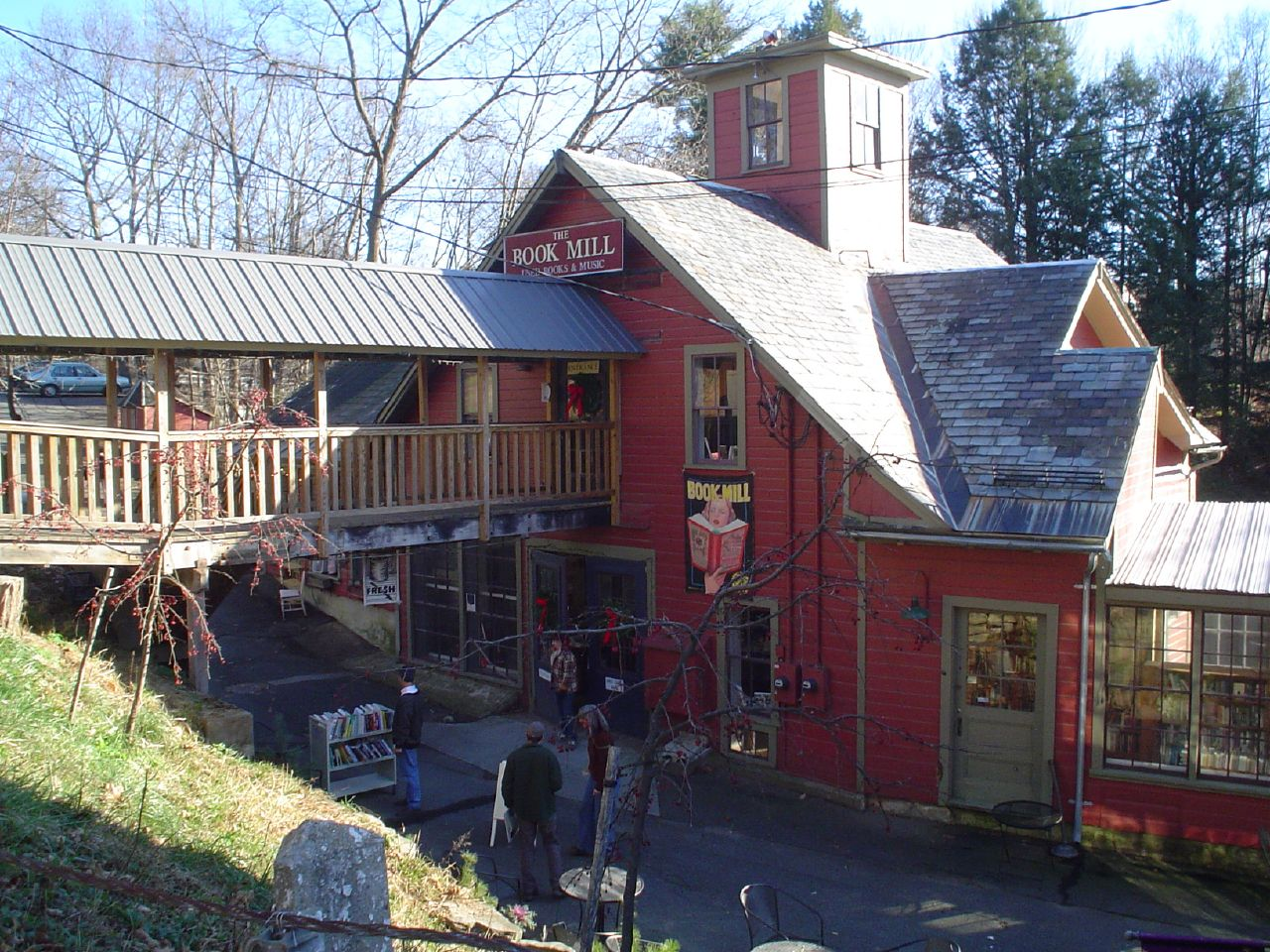
The front entrance to The Bookmill in Montague, Massachusetts.

While this charming pocket of the state, known as the Pioneer Valley, may be wild turkey country, as well as the approach to Vermont ski country, it's also used-book country. Our three-day visit was dedicated to browsing and buying amid the valley's rich and collegial network of bookshops and private dealers. More members of the Massachusetts and Rhode Island Antiquarian Booksellers (36) are to be found in this area than in bookish Greater Boston (25).

— Peter Hellman, "Weekend Excursion; Every Town Is One for the Books", The New York Times (March 13, 1998)

With an independent bookstore in almost every town, several small publishers, and countless local authors, the Valley could well be counted as a reader's paradise. Amherst has at least four bookstores (including Amherst Books and Food for Thought Bookstore), South Hadley has at least one notable bookstore (The Odyssey Bookshop). Since the late 1980s, Montague has had The Bookmill, and the World Eye Bookshop is in its 40th year in Greenfield. John Doe, Jr. used books and records opened in Greenfield the summer of 2009. Federal Street Books is another used bookstore in Greenfield. Northampton has least four independent bookstores (including Broadside Bookshop). One of the more popular, Raven Used Books, features a wide variety of titles and subjects. South Deerfield has New England Auctions, specializing in rare and antiquarian books.

=== Sports ===
The Pioneer Valley is home to a multitude of professional, amateur, and collegiate sports teams, as well as a rich athletic history.

The Springfield Thunderbirds are the region's only professional sports team, competing in the American Hockey League. Historically, the city has had professional hockey dating back to the 1930s with the seven-time Calder Cup champion Springfield Indians. The area has also had several minor-league baseball teams and the Springfield Armor of the NBA Development League.

On the collegiate level, the only school in the region to be a full member of the NCAA's Division I is the University of Massachusetts, although the ice hockey team at American International College competes in the Atlantic Hockey Association, a hockey-only DI conference. There are a multitude of well-known Division III schools as well, including Amherst College.

The most notable amateur team in the region is the Holyoke Blue Sox, members of the New England Collegiate Baseball League.

The region has had many notable professional athletes see significant portions of their careers in the region. Eddie Shore played for and later became the owner of the very successful Springfield Indians franchise; his number 2 remains retired by the Thunderbirds. Julius Erving, one of the top basketball players of all time, played at UMass Amherst. Wrestler John Cena graduated from Springfield College prior to joining the WWE. The most notable athlete to be born in the region is hockey player Bill Guerin, a Stanley Cup champion and Olympic Silver Medalist, who is from Wilbraham.

The region features a lot of independent professional wrestling shows, most notably Pioneer Valley Pro Wrestling, the former New Age Old Tyme Wrestling and The Way Wrestling Was Promotions. Aside from monthly shows, PVP Wrestling also runs charity shows for different benefits.

The region is also credited as being the home of both basketball (invented at Springfield College) and volleyball (invented in Holyoke), as created in the late 1890s; the Naismith Memorial Basketball Hall of Fame and the Volleyball Hall of Fame are located in those cities.

== Economy ==
Historically a region known for growing Connecticut shade tobacco, today the Pioneer Valley has a broad and varied economic base, featuring more than 16 universities and liberal arts colleges (many of which are considered among the United States' best, e.g. Amherst College); numerous hospitals and healthcare organizations (e.g. Baystate Health, Massachusetts' third largest employer), and numerous financial service organizations (e.g. the Fortune 100 MassMutual). Manufacturing remains a part of the Pioneer Valley's economy (e.g. Smith & Wesson), although its manufacturing base has dwindled since 1968, when the Springfield Armory was controversially shut-down. The Pioneer Valley is considered to have a "mature economy", which means that its economic base is sufficiently varied so as not to be completely dependent on market fluctuations, like many places in the United States. This was illustrated during the Great Recession, when Springfield, Massachusetts, and the Pioneer Valley performed within the Top 10 of all U.S. regional economies.

=== Franklin County ===
Franklin County in the north serves as a significant agricultural region despite its size, due to the rich topsoil found in the area. The valley's sweet corn and asparagus are cash crops. Cow corn, potatoes, and shade-grown tobacco are also major crops. Fields of all sort, particularly corn and tobacco fields, as well as numerous farmhouses and tobacco barns, dot the landscape. Light industry is concentrated in the town of South Deerfield and the city of Greenfield, while service industries exist throughout the county. Increasingly Franklin County is becoming a place of bedroom communities, with the major transportation routes of Interstate 91, Route 2, and U.S. Route 5 facilitating a boom in residential building that has not kept pace with commercial development in many of the county's towns.

The Hallmark Institute of Photography is located in Turners Falls.

Two major corporations, Channing Bete and Yankee Candle, are headquartered in South Deerfield and Greenfield. Both communities have been had controversial zoning issues surrounding permitting variances to build big box stores such as Wal-Mart. Greenfield received national attention when its decision prevented Wal-Mart from building a store in town.

The county also garners tourism due to such attractions as Historic Deerfield (which hosts a craft fair in the summer and an even larger and more popular fall craft fair), and a Butterfly Garden located in South Deerfield. The annual arrival of thousands of American and foreign tourists to observe the area's autumn foliage is a welcome boost to revenue.

=== Hampshire County ===
With the Five Colleges, Hampshire County has a significant part of its economy devoted to serving university and liberal arts college students, including numerous independent bookstores and stationery shops. Hampshire County is also one of the most politically liberal counties in the United States, due in large part to Northampton, Amherst, and a large LGBT community centered on the Five College area.

The area is also home to many restaurants, ranging in character from sports bars to steakhouses. Northampton (also known to some as "Hamp" and others as "Noho") is—along with Springfield—the culinary capital of Western Massachusetts as well as a lesbian mecca, featuring the highest number of lesbians per capita according to the United States' 2000 census.

=== Hampden County ===
Hampden County is centered on the region's major economic and cultural center, Springfield, Massachusetts. Springfield is a major transportation hub, lying equidistant to the Ports of Boston and Albany, New York, and also near to New York City and Montreal. Many of the projects that have catalyzed Springfield's recent economic resurgence have been related to transportation, e.g. the $1 billion-plus Knowledge Corridor intercity rail line and the Springfield-Northampton-Brattleboro intercity commuter line. Springfield is also a medical, government, and higher education center. Baystate Health's $300 million "Hospital of the Future" is scheduled for completion in 2012. Massachusetts $110 million high-tech data center—an adaptive re-use of the city's original Technical High School—will also be completed in 2012. Regarding higher education: in 2011, Western New England University and Springfield College each added $45 million-plus additions to their respective campuses in Springfield. Remnants of a manufacturing economy remain in Springfield despite a dramatic de-industrialization in last quarter of the twentieth century; for example, in 2011, Smith & Wesson relocated 225 new jobs to its Springfield headquarters, bringing its total manufacturing workforce in Springfield to over 1150.

Chicopee's growth continues to be catalyzed by the growth of Westover Air Force Base, especially around Memorial Avenue. As of 2011, Holyoke continues to see rapid growth in its high-tech sector, featuring new enterprises that capitalize on Holyoke's abundance of green energy, e.g. water power from the Holyoke Canal System, the nearby Falls, and a proposed wind farm. All three formerly industrialized cities—Springfield, Chicopee, and Holyoke—continue to face typical urban problems, such as gang activity and the drug trade in increasingly isolated parts of each city; however, these activities have lessened significantly during the past 20 years and a spirit of revitalization now pervades each city. Westfield's formerly moribund town center is in the midst of receiving a dramatic makeover, replete with 60-foot clock tower—scheduled to be completed in 2012.

Nearly all other towns and villages in Hampden County are either wealthy suburbs (e.g. Longmeadow, Massachusetts, Wilbraham, Massachusetts), or rural exurbs, (e.g. Palmer, Massachusetts, and Brimfield, Massachusetts). Hampden County also features numerous natural retreats like the Mount Tom and Mount Holyoke Ranges.

In this Hampden County, tourism is very popular. Six Flags New England features the No. 1 roller-coaster in the world ("Bizarro") and draws tourists from all over. Similarly, the Basketball Hall of Fame, a shrine to the world's 2nd most popular sport, invented in Springfield, draws hundreds of thousands of visitors per year. Other major tourist attractions include Western Massachusetts' only national park, the Springfield Armory National Historic Site. The Quadrangle in Springfield features five museums of varying themes, including the United States' first planetarium, gathered around the whimsical Dr. Seuss National Memorial Sculpture Garden. Forest Park (Springfield) designed by Frederick Law Olmsted (of NYC's Central Park fame) is one of the largest urban parks in the United States at 735 acres (297 ha). During the holiday season it features a nationally renowned light display called "Bright Nights". The New England States' collective state fair, The Big E, is held each September–October and generally draws millions of visitors. Springfield's "Parade of Big Balloons" takes place on November 1 each year, borrowing many of the balloons from Macy's Thanksgiving Day Parade and attracting 100,000 spectators. Each July, the Hoops City Jazz Festival draws tens of thousands to Metro Center to hear famous jazz musicians. In 2011, the Vintage Sports Car Club of America moved its famous, annual Grand Prix from Pittsburgh to Springfield—the Springfield Grand Prix took place in 2012, on a 1.6-mile track through the center of the city. Outlying Hampden County towns such as Tolland are sparsely populated and close to the Berkshires—outdoor activities such as camping make up a large part of their economy.

Politically, Hampden County leans liberal; however, it features several notably conservative cities and towns, such as Holyoke, Westfield, Agawam, Monson, and Palmer. Hampden County's largest city, Springfield, while historically moderate, politically, has become nearly as liberal as Hampshire County in recent years, according to voter registration and election results.

== Conservation ==
Appreciation of the natural environs has, historically, been a large part of the Pioneer Valley life. It features numerous non-profit nature sanctuaries, such as Friends of Wissatinnewag, Inc. 43 acres (17 ha) a sacred Native American burial grounds where the Turners Falls massacre occurred in 1676, as well as historic parks like King Phillip's Stockade in Springfield, the 735 acres (297 ha) Forest Park, designed by Frederick Law Olmsted, and Western Massachusetts' only national park, the Springfield Armory National Historic Site. The Great Falls Discovery Center, the flagship visitor center of the multi-state, Silvio O. Conte National Fish and Wildlife Refuge is located in Turners Falls. In addition to these, there are hundreds of state and municipal parks and forests. Due to the considerable natural and cultural resources in the Pioneer Valley, environmental agencies have made a substantial investments in protecting unspoiled nature in the region, particularly along the Connecticut River, and in many of the Pioneer Valley's rural "hilltowns." Government conservation efforts have targeted wildlife and rare plant habitats, recreational sites and corridors including the Metacomet-Monadnock Trail, and the rich agricultural soils in farming towns such as Hadley, Massachusetts. Efforts have been augmented and assisted by local and regional conservation land trusts and statewide and national conservation organizations. Many of these organizations protect additional land through direct ownership of conservation areas and land held under conservation easement. Many municipalities in the area also have conservation holdings, usually under the aegis of the community's 'conservation commission', the appointed body which also applies local and state environmental regulations.

One notable area consists of Mount Tom State Reservation, Mount Holyoke Range State Park, and Skinner State Park, which, joined with the 600-acre (2.4 km^{2}) Arcadia Wildlife Sanctuary held by the Massachusetts Audubon Society, form a long wildlife corridor stretching across the Connecticut River.

Recently, there has been a notable grassroots effort to reclaim Springfield's once easily accessible and pedestrian-friendly waterfront, which is now separated from the city by the eight-lane, elevated highway Interstate 91. In 2010, the Urban Land Institute presented a plan that suggested how Springfield could reunite with its greatest natural resource, the Connecticut River.

== See also ==
- Knowledge Corridor
- Massachusetts geography
- Metropolitan Springfield
- Pioneer Valley Transit Authority
- Western Massachusetts
