= Audrey Geisel =

American philanthropist (1921–2018)

- Geisel in 2002
- Born: Audrey Grace Florine Stone; August 14, 1921; Chicago, Illinois, U.S.
- Died: December 19, 2018 (aged 97); San Diego, California, U.S.
- Spouses: Edmunds Grey Dimond (m. 1945; div. 1968); Theodor Seuss Geisel (m. 1968; died 1991)
- Children: 2

Audrey Grace Florine Stone Geisel (August 14, 1921 – December 19, 2018) was the second wife of American children's book author Theodor Geisel (Dr. Seuss), to whom she was married from 1968 until his death in 1991. She founded Dr. Seuss Enterprises in 1993, and was president and CEO of the company until her death in 2018.

== Early life and education ==
Audrey Grace Florine Stone was the daughter of Norman Alfred Stone, an English medical furniture salesman, and Ruth Benson, a nurse whose family was from Norway. She was baptized at the Ravenswood Covenant Church in Chicago, Illinois, United States. She grew up in and around Queens, New York, moving around as often as an "army brat". Her parents' marriage was "off and on" and her father left early in her life. When she was five, her mother moved into a nurses' dormitory at the Manhattan Eye, Ear and Throat Hospital and sent her to live with a friend in New Rochelle, New York. However, her mother did visit her on weekends. At this time, the young Audrey attended Julia Richmond School, Manhattan.

== Nursing career ==
Geisel studied nursing at Indiana University School of Nursing in Indianapolis, earning a Bachelor of Science in nursing in 1944. Of her university application, she said she knew she was supposed to say that she wanted to "serve humanity", but what she really wanted was "to be in the centre of the action."

She worked in Massachusetts and at the Coleman Obstetrical and Gynecological Hospital at the Indiana University Medical Center. Long after she finished working as a nurse, she continued renewing her credentials, refusing to "hang up the whites” officially.

== Marriage to Edmunds Dimond ==
In 1945 she married fellow student Edmunds Grey Dimond. He became a resident physician at Indiana University Medical Center and later Dean of Cardiology at the University of Kansas. While the couple travelled to and lived in Japan and Netherlands for his work, where she took lessons in sculpture. They had two daughters, Lark Grey (b. 1953), a sculptor, and Lea Grey, a bookstore owner. Of her role as a mother, she said, "I was the kind of mother I now regret […] But I don't live with regret, because what you see is what they got." After Audrey's death, her daughters disputed this self-description, saying they had developed a warm relationship with their mother. The family moved to La Jolla, San Diego, in 1960 for Dimond to join Scripps Clinic, while Audrey volunteered in cancer wards.

== Marriage to Ted Geisel (a.k.a. Dr. Seuss) ==
Audrey met Seuss and his first wife, Helen Palmer, at a party in La Jolla. Of their first meeting she said, "As we went through the line, I noticed that when we got to Dr. Seuss, the inflection of the person introducing us was slightly different […] I thought, 'Well, it's for some reason.' Being my facetious best, I said, 'Dr. Seuss, you must have a very interesting specialty. The right or the left nostril?' And I remember him looking at me kind of startled and making no response." The two couples became friends and later Audrey and Theodor began an affair, about which she said, "The feeling was that at his age you grab for the gusto. You don't wait. You don't think you have that much time." Palmer died by suicide on October 23, 1967. In May 1968 Seuss wrote to friends, "Audrey and I are going to be married […] I am acquiring two daughters, aged nine and fourteen. I am rebuilding the house to take care of the influx. I am 64 years old. I am marrying a woman seventeen years younger… I have not flipped my lid. This is not a sudden nutty decision… This is an inevitable, inescapable conclusion […] All I can ask you is to try to believe in me." Audrey divorced Edmunds Dimond on June 21, 1968.

After the legally required six-week wait, Audrey married Seuss on August 5, 1968, at the Washoe County Courthouse in Reno, Nevada. They invited no friends. They lived in a "Mount Soledad aerie" in La Jolla, where Seuss had previously lived with Palmer. It had an "old stucco observatory and elegant, helter-skelter maze of rooms they have built around it." When she moved in with Seuss, Audrey sent her daughters to boarding school of which she said "They wouldn't have been happy with Ted, and Ted wouldn't have been happy with them." Her daughters later disputed this statement and said that Seuss had been a warm and loving father. She also said "I've never been very maternal. There were too many other things I wanted to do. My life with him was what I wanted my life to be." The couple travelled widely around the world, including Cambodia, India, France, United Kingdom, Kenya, Turkey, Greece, Italy, Spain, Portugal, Australia, New Zealand, Morocco, Israel, Lebanon, and many other countries and territories.

When Seuss started losing his sight to glaucoma in 1975, Audrey served as his "eyes and driver". She took credit for Seuss's appearance, saying "I created the beard. He had a nose that was looking for a beard all his life." It was in part to make Seuss's life easier as he began to lose his sight. In 1989 Geisel was diagnosed with a benign brain tumour. It was successfully removed in January 1990. She nursed Seuss during his final illness. He died of cancer in 1991.

=== Springfield, Massachusetts ===
Audrey first visited Seuss' birthplace, Springfield, Massachusetts, soon after their wedding. In 1997 she initiated fundraising to create a Dr. Seuss National Memorial Sculpture Garden in the town, by donating $1m. The garden includes bronze sculptures created by Audrey's daughter, Lark Grey Dimond-Cates. Fifteen years later, with Audrey's approval, Springfield opened The Amazing World of Dr. Seuss Museum.

=== Working with Seuss ===
In her introduction to The Complete Cat in the Hat Audrey wrote about Seuss's writing process and how she was responsible for collecting "as many paperback thrillers as I could find, bring them home, stash them in a secret location and bring them out one at a time" when he was stuck for ideas and needed a break. Of her relationship with Seuss, she said, "The idea was to keep the body there so it could take that mind as far as it wanted to go. I kept the Band-Aids going."

Audrey was "credited with reinvigorating her husband's creative output". He published 20 books during their 25-year marriage, including The Lorax, You're Only Old Once! and Oh, the Places You'll Go!. She was proud of her contributions to Seuss's work. His editors at Random House told her "His juices were getting diluted, and he needed something to start him again."

She was also credited with "encouraging her husband to address more social issues" in his books, specifically The Lorax and the anti-war The Butter Battle Book. When Seuss was stuck while trying to write a book about conservation issues, Geisel suggested a trip to Kenya to get his mind off his work. While there, Seuss saw a herd of elephants. Of the sight, he said he "grabbed a laundry list that I had beside me and wrote the whole book The Lorax in 45 minutes." On the same trip, Seuss saw people cutting down acacia trees, and "he thought, 'they can't cut down my Dr. Seuss trees' – which he renamed Truffula trees."

During an interview in 1986, Seuss noted that Audrey studied art and called her "the colour expert […] She always makes sure to tell me what's bad." Geisel "accepted credit" for Seuss's change of colour palette for The Lorax. Seuss also said Geisel was "the only adult who could read [his stories] aloud."

=== After Seuss's death ===
In 1991, in response to the anti-abortion movement's adopting of a line from Horton Hears a Who! – "A person's a person no matter how small" – in support of its cause, Audrey stated she "doesn't like people to hijack Dr. Seuss characters or material to front their own points of view."

In the early 2000s Audrey dated Alexander Butterfield.

She received a star on the Hollywood Walk of Fame on behalf of Seuss in 2004.

== Dr. Seuss Enterprises ==
Before Seuss died, Geisel had "the impression that I was going to be fairly involved in everything, […] it began to dawn on me that there was going to be a tremendous transition after his loss – I was going to do everything!" Seuss left behind "drawers, closets and files of unsorted, uncatalogued material".

To protect Seuss's name and copyrights, Dr. Seuss Enterprises was created in 1993. Geisel was President and CEO and would "hold court each morning with aides at a La Valencia Hotel's restaurant in San Diego […] arriving in a 1984 Cadillac with licence plate that said GRINCH." Geisel was the prima inter pares on the board of three directors.

Of her role, in 1994 she said, "My absolute desire, creed, intent is to carry forth from this day Ted's books, the sharing and ongoingness of those books, generation by generation, for all the reasons they were written in the first place. They're in our language." Of looking after Seuss's characters she said "You keep firm control as if they really were your children. I don't want the Cat in the Hat in a bad part of town, so to speak."

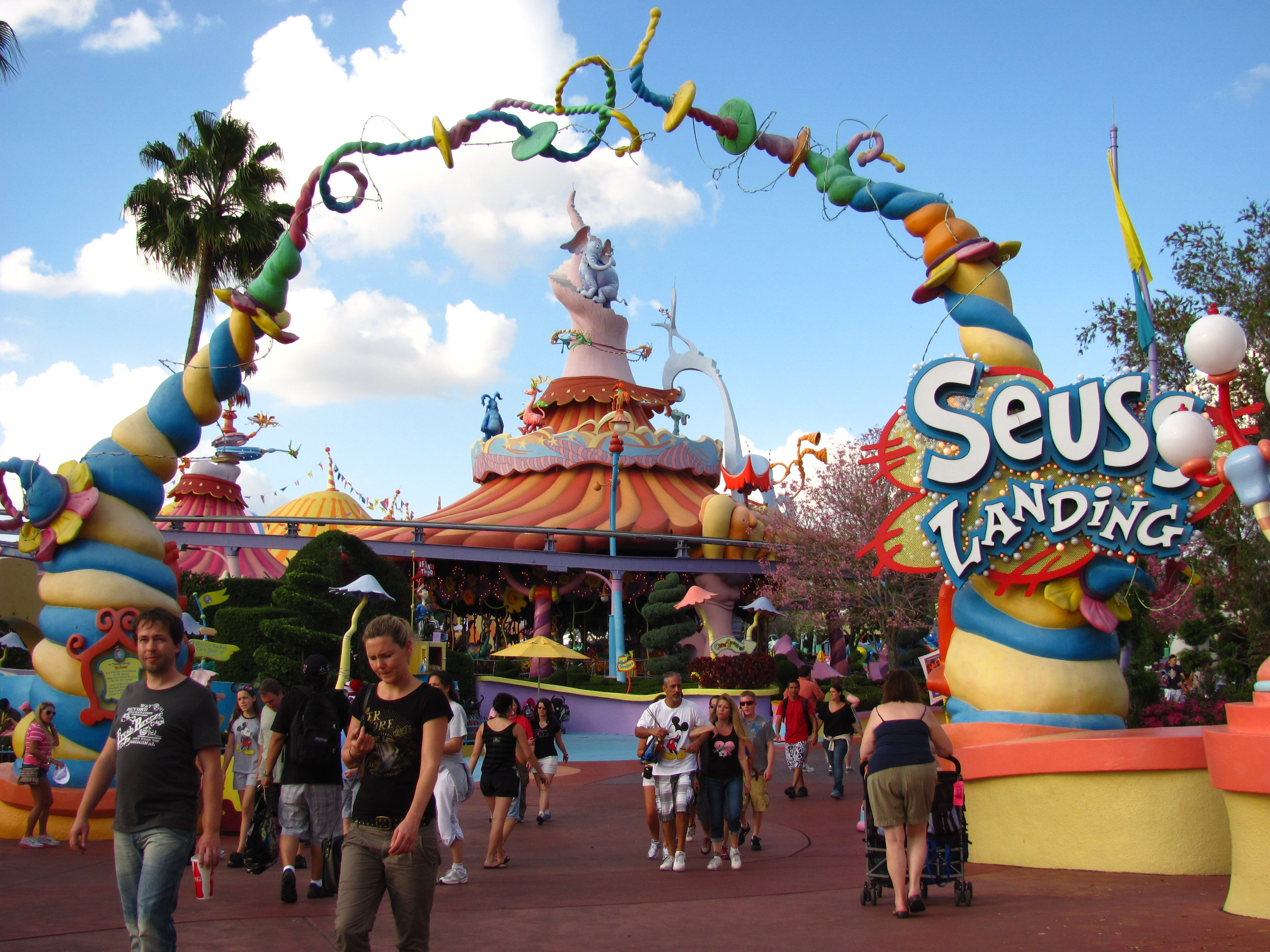
Seuss Landing, Universal Islands of Adventure, Florida

Soon after establishing Dr. Seuss Enterprises, Universal Pictures approached Geisel about creating a Seuss-inspired ride at the Universal Islands of Adventure, Florida. She refused, being "concerned the park would cheapen the image of Dr. Seuss." After many redesigns, Geisel finally gave her approval in 1995, retaining a lot of creative control during the production process of Seuss Landing.

In 1994, she signed a deal with Living Books, a joint venture between Broderbund Software and Random House, for the multimedia rights to Seuss's work.

By 1996, there was concern that Geisel had been over-saturating the market with too many Seuss-related products, with Brian Henson of Jim Henson Productions saying, "it is an unusual situation where there are different people working with the same characters on different sorts of projects all over the place. That makes it a little confusing." However, on one point Geisel was firm: "I don't want to go into the food business. I don't want one of our little people poking out from a box of Wheat Chex."

In 1996, Steven Spielberg secured the rights to The Cat in the Hat for a live-action film. However, in 1999 Geisel reclaimed the rights, saying, "They just couldn't get it right."

After an aborted deal with TriStar Pictures had been cleared up, "one of Hollywood's biggest-ever book auctions" took place in 1998, with Universal Pictures paying $5 million for the rights to How The Grinch Stole Christmas and up to $4 million for Oh, The Places You'll Go. As part of the bidding process, which included Tom Shadyac, the Farrelly brothers, Gary Ross and John Hughes, each interested party needed to pay $3 million to secure a meeting with Geisel.

In 2004, she presided over Seusstennial: A Century of Imagination marking the centenary of Seuss's birth. In 2013 she "opened the Estate's vault" and allowed some of Seuss's hat collection to tour the States, as the Hats Off to Dr. Seuss exhibition. In 2015 she curated The Art of Dr. Seuss, an exhibition of paintings and sculptures.

=== Books ===
Geisel was involved in the following Seuss-related publications:

Year	Title	Publisher	Notes
1994	Daisy-Head Mayzie by Dr. Seuss	Random House	Geisel found the manuscript "buried at the bottom of a drawer" in the home she had shared with Seuss. Of the discovery she said "To find something like that after I no longer had him was just wonderful for me."
1995	The Secret Art of Dr. Seuss by Dr. Seuss	Random House	Produced in conjunction with Chase Art Group
1996	Theodor Seuss Geisel: Reminiscences & Tributes by Edward Connery Lathem	Continuum	Geisel wrote the introduction
1996	My Many Colored Days by Dr. Seuss	Random House	Seuss wrote the text in 1973. Geisel brought it to the attention of his publishers after his death in 1992. When it was published four years later she wrote, "Ted had a panoramic view of ocean and land from his study, and he found the constantly changing patterns of light and color fascinating. He liked to compare the 'mood', or color, of the day to his own emotional barometer setting. Though his inspiration for this book was personal, he felt that someone else should bring his or her own vision to it". The illustrations were made by Steve Johnson and Lou Fancher.
1997	Seuss-isms: Wise and Witty Prescriptions for Living from the Good Doctor	Random House	Geisel wrote the introduction. Containing Seuss aphorisms, about which Geisel said, "Seuss's books contain more sane, sensible, and just plain hilarious advice for living than most of the self-help books crowding bookstores today."
1997	Oh, Baby, the Places You'll Go!: a Book to be Read In Utero by Tish Rabe	Random House	Geisel wrote the introduction, which included: "Some years ago, Ted and I came across an article about some researchers who had asked prospective mothers and fathers to read aloud to their babies in utero. To our delight, the book they read was 'The Cat In The Hat'"
1999	Green Eggs and Ham by Dr. Seuss	Living Books	An interactive storybook made in consultation with Geisel
2004	The Complete Cat in the Hat by Dr. Seuss	Collins	Geisel wrote the introduction.
2004	Your Favorite Seuss: 13 stories Written and Illustrated by Dr. Seuss with 13 Introductory Essays	Random House	Contributed the article Living with the Cat
2008	America's New Future: 100 New Answers: A Glimpse of the Future by 100 American Decision Makers by Doris Lee McCoy	Morgan James Publishing	Contributor
2011	The Bippolo Seed and Other Lost Stories by Dr. Seuss	Random House	Geisel "worked with Random House" to publish seven 'lost' Dr Seuss stories from the 1950s about which she said "I totally, wonderfully approve of anything that comes to light at this time of Ted's work"
2015	What Pet Should I Get? by Dr. Seuss	Random House	Geisel found the manuscript during a house renovation.
2015	Oh, the Things You Can Do that are Good for You! All about Staying Healthy by Tish Rabe	Random House	
2015	Oh, the Places You'll Go 25th Anniversary Portfolio by Dr. Seuss	Random House	Geisel wrote the introduction
2019	Dr. Seuss's Horse Museum	Random House	Geisel found 80% of this book in a folder marked 'Noble Failures' after Seuss's death. It was completed by Andrew Joyner, an Australian illustrator.

Seuss dedicated the following books to Geisel and her daughters:

- Fox in Socks (1965) – dedicated to "Mitzi Long and Audrey Dimond of the Mt. Soledad Lingual Laboratories"
- The Cat in the Hat Songbook (1967) – dedicated to "Lark and Lea of Luddington Lane", Geisel's daughters
- I Can Lick 30 Tigers Today! and Other Stories (1969) – dedicated to Geisel.

=== Film and TV ===
Geisel was involved in the following in her role as CEO of Dr. Seuss Enterprises:

Year	Title	Distributor	Geisel's role and notes
1994	Daisy-Head Mayzie	Hanna-Barbera	Producer. Won CableACE award for best children's special
1995	The Wubbulous World of Dr. Seuss	Jim Henson Productions	
1998	An Awfully Big Adventure: The Making of Modern Children's Literature	BBC	Geisel was the narrator
2000	How the Grinch Stole Christmas!	Universal Pictures	Producer Brian Grazer won the rights after a two-year process. Of Geisel, he said "Audrey Geisel was a little like Isaac Asimov's wife, in fact: she was a fierce protector of the legacy of her husband." He described Geisel as "Very sharp, somewhat reserved, and tough." Director Ron Howard went through eight scripts before Geisel gave her approval. Actor Jim Carrey had to "literally convince Geisel of his ability to play the part".
2003	The Cat in the Hat	Universal Pictures; DreamWorks Pictures	Of Mike Myers' performance Geisel said, "I never saw Austin Powers but I knew 'Yeah, baby!' and I didn't want that at all."
2008	Horton Hears a Who!	20th Century Fox	Producer. Geisel reportedly prompted some changes, stating Horton's teeth were too big, and the kangaroo's pouch hung too low. Additionally, Geisel personally requested that Jim Carrey voice Horton following his performance as the Grinch.
2012	The Lorax	Universal Pictures	Executive producer and "benevolent overseer"
2018	The Grinch	Universal Pictures	Executive producer
2019–22	Green Eggs and Ham	Netflix	Screenwriter Jared Stern said, "I had to pitch the story to her, and it was incredibly scary. Once it was over, she said something to the effect of 'I wondered what you were going to do to this. But I think you captured it, and you have our blessing.'"

=== Theatre ===
- 1998 – Dr. Seuss How the Grinch Stole Christmas. Premiered at The Old Globe, San Diego. Geisel gifted them the rights, about which the former artistic director said, it was "a gift that has continued giving to our theatre and the community long after both of our individual departures." Geisel had a walk-on part in the 2006 production.
- 1999 – Geisel attended workshops for Seussical: The Musical. It premiered in 2000 in Boston. Of the production she said, "I was completely captivated."

== Dr. Seuss Foundation ==
Geisel became president of the Dr. Seuss Foundation, which was established in 1958. A portion of all sales of Dr. Seuss books is donated to the Foundation which supports the arts, civic and public affairs, education, health, international relief, social services and religious welfare with a focus on California.

In 1993, together with Kellogg's Corporation, the Foundation donated 500,000 books to nearly 2,000 schools which served disadvantaged children. In 1998 Geisel waived royalties to How the Grinch Stole Christmas! and donated $100,000 from the Foundation to help cover the costs of free tickets for San Diego's children who would be unable to afford to pay otherwise.

== Dr. Seuss Fund ==
The fund supported (and continues to support) dozens of charitable organisations in San Diego through the donation of "millions of dollars". Of her support of San Diego, she said, "I truly love this town. And I saw all the problems in the underbelly […] all the mental problems, poverty, sociological problems. Illiteracy." In 2000 she said, "I'm kind of the safety net under San Diego." Some of the causes she supported included:

- Center for Family Literacy
- Charter 100
- Ida Green Cancer Center
- March of Dimes
- La Jolla Playhouse
- Mental Health Association
- Mingei International Museum
- Museum of Contemporary Art San Diego
- Museum of Photographic Arts
- Old Globe Theatre
- Salk President's Club, founding donor
- San Diego Council on Literacy
- San Diego Museum of Art
- San Diego Opera
- San Diego Symphony
- San Diego Zoological Society
- Vista Hill
- Voices for Children

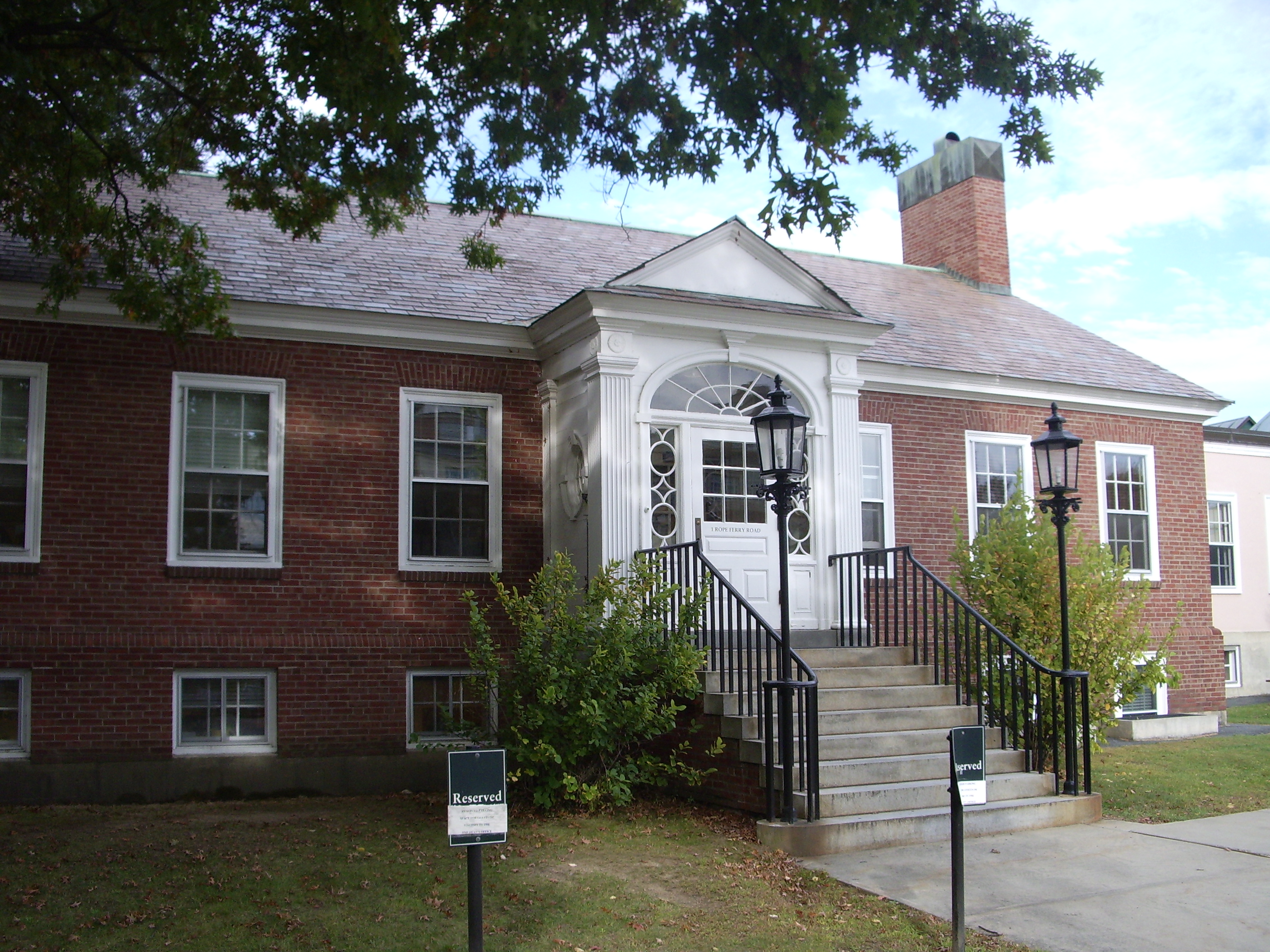
1 Rope Ferry Road, part of the Geisel School of Medicine, Dartmouth

Through the Association for Library Service to Children (ALSC) the fund established the Theodor Seuss Geisel Award for the "most distinguished American book for beginning readers". In 2012 the Dartmouth Medical School was renamed the Geisel School of Medicine, to reflect the couple's generosity over many years.

=== Relationship with University of California, San Diego (UCSD) ===
Following Geisel's death, the Chancellor of UCSD said the university "would not be the same top-ranked research institution it is today without her enthusiastic generosity and vast university involvement." Geisel was involved in many aspects of the university's activities. Of her relationship with UCSD she said "I feel so much part of this university. I just do."

Geisel's support included:

- 1992 – donating almost 20,000 "drawings, sketches, notebooks and other memorabilia dating from the 1970s to 1990s" to UCSD library with a value of $2.3 million
- 1993 – she opened the Geisel Room in a wing of the university's library.

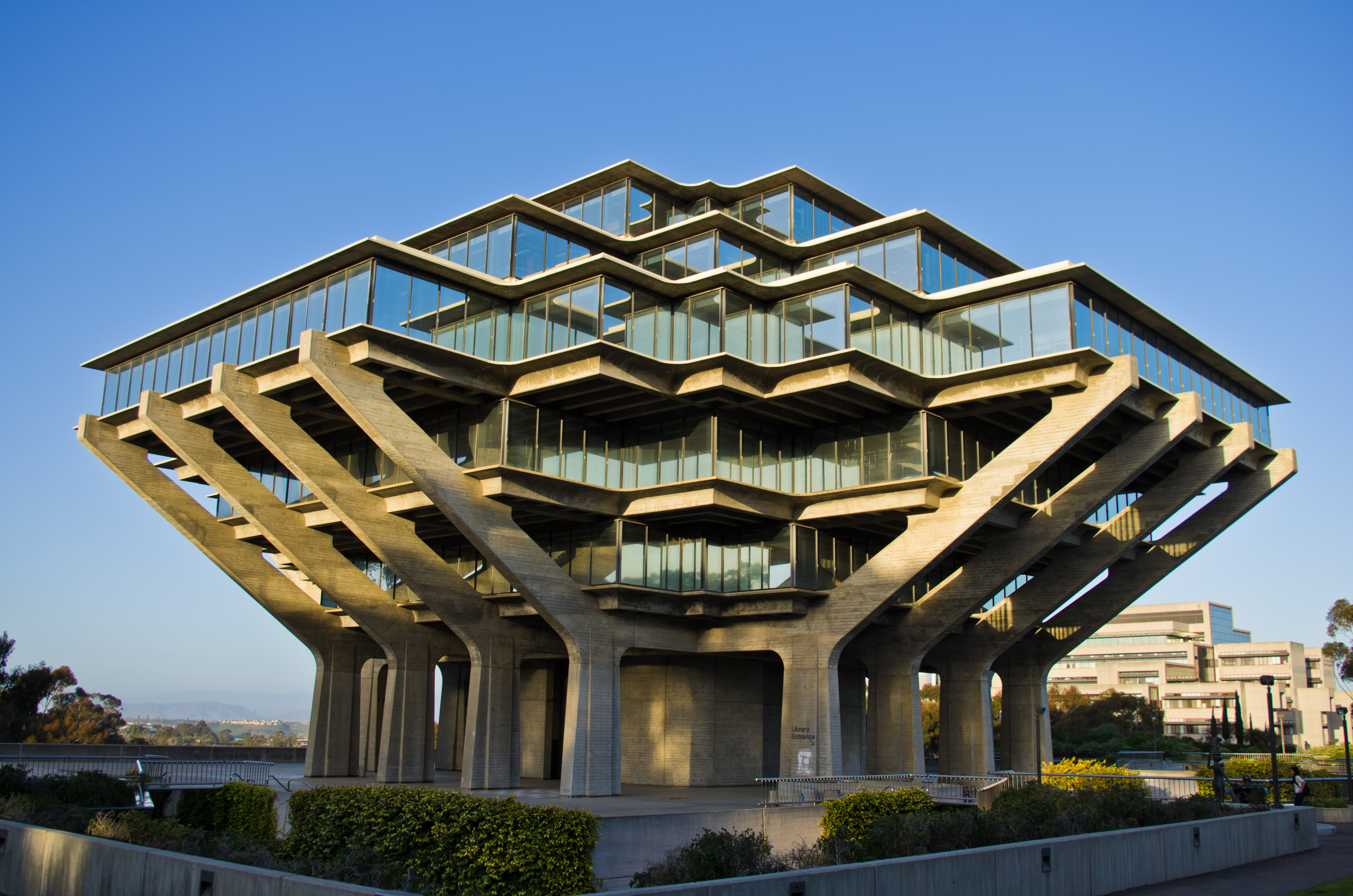
Geisel Library, University of California, San Diego

- 1995 – gave $20 million, the single largest donation to UCSD, "believed to be the largest single donation ever made to any San Diego institution." The main library was renamed Geisel Library in recognition of the gift. Of the donation, Geisel said "The UCSD Library is so right for Ted. First, because literacy has always been our primary interest. If we could conquer illiteracy, many of the other causes we support to sustain people – the abused, the homeless, and the need for remedial education – would, to some extent, disappear. The library is the symbol of our commitment. And the UCSD Library is especially suited for that role. The first time Ted saw the form of that building he said to me 'If I had turned my thoughts toward designing a building, it might have looked strangely similar to this.'"
- 2007 – donated $1 million to establish the Audrey Geisel University Librarianship. The endowed position provides discretionary funding — in perpetuity — to continually enhance and expand the staff, resources and services of the library.

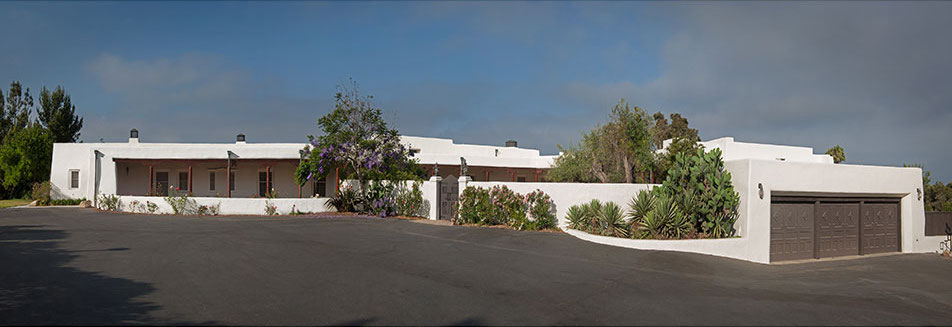
Audrey Geisel University House, UCSD

- 2013 – donated $2 million for the renovation of the University House. It was renamed the Audrey Geisel University House in her honour
- 2015 – donated $3 million to Geisel Library to renovate the library's interior

She also supported the Scripps Institution of Oceanography and Health Sciences, UCSD Sulpizio Cardiovascular Center and the Preuss School.

She was on the following UCSD boards:

- Campaign for UCSD, honorary co-chair
- University Librarian Advisory Board
- Board of Visitors of the School of Medicine
- Moores Cancer Center Board
- Women's Association of the Salk Institute for Biological Studies, founding member

Following her death, Scripps renamed the pavilion on its Torrey Pines site the Geisel Pavilion. Geisel's La Jolla home was donated to UCSD. It was put up for sale in 2022 with the net proceeds put into a Geisel Fund.

== Death ==
Geisel died at her home on December 19, 2018, at the age of 97.

== Board memberships ==
- Chancellor's Associates Silver Circle
- Director's Circle
- Million Dollar Leadership Circle of Vista Hill
- National Hospice Foundation, founding trustee
- Old Globe Theatre, honorary director
- San Diego Council on Literacy, board member
- San Diego History Society, Curator's Circle

== Awards, honours and nominations ==
Geisel received the following:

Year	Organisation	Award	Ref
1994	National Hospice Organization	Champion Award	
1995	Primetime Emmy Award	Nominated for Daisy-Headed Mayzie	
1995	Revelle Award	For "distinguished and sustained service to University of California, San Diego by persons who are not members of its faculty or staff"	
2000	Dartmouth College	Honorary degree	
2001	Indiana University	IUPUI Spirit of Philanthropy Award	
2007	Indiana University	Honorary Doctor of Humane Letters (LHD)	
2008	Scripps Clinic and Scripps Green Hospital	A star was named in her honour to recognise over 50 years of support	
2010	University of California, San Diego	Chancellor's Medal	
2011	San Diego Business Journal	Women Who Mean Business Lifetime Achievement Award	
2011	The Old Globe, San Diego	Honored Geisel at its annual gala in recognition of her "significant contributions"	
2012	Scripps Research Institute	Reception in Geisel's honour by in recognition of her donation to upgrade the auditorium	
2012	San Diego Symphony	Honored Geisel at a performance of The Sneetches	
2013	UC San Diego Sulpizio Cardiovascular Center	Honoree of the Heart of San Diego Gala	
2016	Prado	Honored Geisel at their 2019 gala "for the inspiration and countless contributions she has made to the arts which enrich our community"	
2016	UC San Diego	Library café named Audrey's in her honour	
2016		San Diego Legendary Women of the Heart	
Unknown	Hospice of San Diego	Sixth Annual Humanitarian Award	

Geisel created the following awards and positions:

- Audrey Geisel Friend of Military Children award
- Audrey Geisel Endowed Chair in Innovation, Indiana University School of Nursing
- Audrey Geisel University Librarian
- Audrey Geisel Chair in Biomedical Sciences, Salk Institute for Biological Studies
- Audrey Geisel Cancer Foundation
- Audrey S Geisel Managing Director, The Old Globe Theatre, San Diego

== See also ==
- Dr. Seuss and Mr Geisel: A Biography (1995) Morgan, J. and Morgan N. Pub. Da Capo Press. ISBN 030680736X
