= Horse Museum (Dr. Seuss) =

2019 book based on a manuscript by Dr. Seuss

- Author: Dr. Seuss; Andrew Joyner
- Cover artist: Andrew Joyner
- Language: English
- Genre: Children's literature
- Publisher: Random House
- Publication date: September 3, 2019
- Publication place: United States
- Preceded by: What Pet Should I Get?
- Followed by: Sing the 50 United States!

Horse Museum is a Dr. Seuss book released by Random House Children's Books on September 3, 2019. It is based on an unfinished manuscript by Theodor Seuss Geisel completed by Australian illustrator Andrew Joyner. 250,000 copies were released of the first printing.

It is the seventh Dr. Seuss book released posthumously, following Daisy-Head Mayzie (1995), My Many Colored Days (1996), Hooray for Diffendoofer Day! (1998), The Bippolo Seed and Other Lost Stories (2011), Horton and the Kwuggerbug and More Lost Stories (2014), and What Pet Should I Get? (2015). An eighth posthumous book, Sing the 50 United States! was published in 2026.

== Background ==
Following the 1991 death of Geisel, his wife Audrey Geisel and assistant Claudia Prescott cleared his office, donating the bulk of his unpublished works to the University of California, San Diego and archiving a few others in a box. In October 2013, they examined the manuscripts and sketches contained in the box, finding a folder marked "Noble Failures" of uncategorized drawings, a more complete project titled The Pet Shop which was later completed and released as What Pet Should I Get?, illustrations for flashcards, and a collection of sketches titled The Horse Museum.

The unfinished manuscript was about 80% complete, and was accompanied only by rough sketches but not any completed original artwork by Geisel.

== Description ==
The principal plot of Horse Museum is a horse leading a tour group of students through an art museum. The book includes illustrations by Andrew Joyner, and colour photographic reproductions of horse-related artwork by artists including Rosa Bonheur, Deborah Butterfield, Alexander Calder, Jacob Lawrence, Franz Marc, Pablo Picasso, Jackson Pollock, and George Stubbs. Other artwork features the Grinch, Horton the Elephant, and The Cat in the Hat.

The book contains a colophon with a publisher's note explaining background information about the book, including the discovery of the manuscript and associated sketches, artists and artworks depicted in the book, Geisel's interest in art, and Joyner's approach to illustration.

== See also ==
- List of works published posthumously
