= Sing the 50 United States! =

Book by Dr. Seuss

- The book's front cover
- Author: Dr. Seuss
- Cover artist: Tom Brannon
- Language: English
- Genre: Children's literature
- Publisher: Random House
- Publication date: June 2, 2026
- Publication place: United States
- ISBN: 9798217228560
- Preceded by: Horse Museum

Sing the 50 United States! is a children's book by American author and illustrator Dr. Seuss. Announced on October 28, 2025, it is the first full, posthumous manuscript by Dr. Seuss to be discovered since What Pet Should I Get? in 2015. Theodor Seuss Geisel, known by his pen name Dr. Seuss, died in 1991.

The book is designed to teach children the names of the 50 U.S. states. It was discovered in April 2025 at the Geisel Library at the University of California, San Diego, where much of Geisel's archive is held. The book was published on June 2, 2026—shortly before the United States Semiquincentennial—by Random House, with an initial print run of 500,000 copies.

== Discovery ==
The manuscript was uncovered when three researchers visited the Geisel Library to study sketches from existing works. Archivists provided them with 20 boxes of Geisel's papers and materials, within which they found handwritten working notes and a clean, signed typewritten draft of Sing the 50 United States! The notes were undated and showed no evidence of editorial review.

Susan Brandt, president and CEO of Dr. Seuss Enterprises, described the discovery as "like finding a time capsule of his imagination."

== Contents and illustrations ==
The book features the Cat in the Hat alongside two Little Cat helpers, guiding readers through the names of all fifty states. The found materials includes a cover sketch and art direction notes. The inside dust jacket features a map of the United States. The illustrations were completed in Seuss's signature style by Tom Brannon.

== Related projects ==
Dr. Seuss Enterprises has announced plans for a related music video to be released on the official Dr. Seuss YouTube channel. In addition, the company will sponsor a nationwide "backpack build" program, distributing backpacks filled with Dr. Seuss books and school supplies to students in all 50 states.
