= The Secret Art of Dr. Seuss =

Book by Dr. Seuss

- Author: Dr. Seuss
- Cover artist: Dr. Seuss
- Language: English
- Genre: Visual art
- Publisher: Random House
- Publication date: December 1, 1995
- Publication place: United States
- Media type: Print (hardcover and paperback)
- ISBN: 0-679-43448-8
- OCLC: 32508788
- Dewey Decimal: 759.13 20
- LC Class: ND237.G325 A4 1995
- Preceded by: Daisy-Head Mayzie
- Followed by: My Many Colored Days

The Secret Art of Dr. Seuss (ISBN 0-679-43448-8) is a collection of visual art created by Theodor Seuss Geisel, better known as Dr. Seuss. It was published in 1995, after Geisel's death, by Random House of New York.

== Contents of the book ==
=== Visual art ===
The bulk of this collection consists of painting and drawing. It does, however, include photographs of many sculptures created by Geisel. Both forms of art display the characteristic style and form that can be seen in all of his children's books.

==== Sculpture ====
All of Dr. Seuss's sculptures display the same themes, which are taxidermy and trophy hunting. Each sculpture takes the form of an imaginary and fantastic creature displayed on a wood mount in the style of a hunting trophy. Most of his pieces in this category make use of authentic animal parts.

=== Introduction/foreword ===
In addition to visual art, Secret Art provides more personal insight into the life of Theodor Geisel. The book opens with a very short introductory letter by Geisel's widow, Audrey Geisel, titled "A Personal Note About Theodor Seuss Geisel", as well as an introduction by Maurice Sendak, both of which relate anecdotal tales of Geisel's work ethic and artistic vision.

== Media ==
Dr. Seuss used a wide variety of media in his art. In keeping with the post-modernist tradition, Seuss is very experimental with his media; he even uses a hinged window frame and screen as a frame for one of his oil paintings.

=== Paintings and drawings ===
Theodor Seuss Geisel's favored medium is watercolor, usually either on bristol or illustration board. He also makes ample use of ink or pen, oil, and acrylic. This selection of media helps to expand his distinctive style.

=== Sculpture ===
The most distinct aspect of Geisel's sculpture is his choice of medium. As mentioned above, all of his sculptures take the form of hunting-lodge trophies in the forms of surreal or fantasy animals. As if to enhance this effect, Dr. Seuss uses real parts of dead animals and animal by-products. Each sculpture is hung on a plain wood mount.

=== Complete list of media ===
==== Two-dimensional art ====
- pencil
- ink
- watercolor
- colored pencil
- whiteout
- oil pastel
- pen
- oil
- acrylic
- casein
- gouache
- enamel
- crayon

On

- bristol/illustration/drawing board
- paper
- watercolor board

==== Sculpture ====
- plaster
- metal
- screws
- laminate
- shaving brush
- horns (ex. kudu)
- oil
- fur
- beak
- leather
- bull's horn
- sawfish bill

== Classification and analysis ==
Many have tried to classify Dr. Seuss's artwork, but there is no true consensus among critics on which school of art or movement he belongs to.

Although he was no longer working at the time the terms were coined, he can probably be best defined as a combination of early forms of maximalism and cute formalism. This is evident not only in the visual aesthetic of his work, but also in his work ethic. In the maximalist tradition, his work is very bright, sensual, visually rich, and extremely detailed. He was also very conscientious, and his pieces are all very formalistic and work-extensive. All of his pieces also display a childish and playful nature, with a touch of femininity and a sense of ironic politeness, which leads to the assertion that he was a preemptive cute formalist. This observation is particularly interesting because of the evident Oriental influence on Geisel's art, and both of these movements are centered in Eastern Asian culture (Chinese and Japanese, respectively).

Some have labeled Seuss's art as expressionist, but critics of this argument claim that his working style and ethics were not in-line with those of expressionism. Expressionism is usually defined as the exaggeration or over-emphasis of shapes, forms, and colors to heighten emotional reaction. While Dr. Seuss's art is clearly very exaggerated and emotional, many critics do not believe it was created with the deliberate attempt at emotional "shock value" they see as being characteristic of expressionism.

Neither of these arguments has much critical support, but then, neither do many other arguments concerning the classification of Theodor Seuss Geisel; in fact, he died before some of these terms were even coined. His works were quickly acquired by American pop art galleries, and some (but very few) critics consider it kitsch. Perhaps the safest classification is just as transgressive art, or even just the broader umbrella term of postmodernism.

== See also ==
- Dr. Seuss
- Transgressive art
- Postmodernism
