= Mill River (Springfield, Massachusetts) =

Stream in the U.S. state of Massachusetts

Coordinates: 42°06′25″N 72°32′35″W

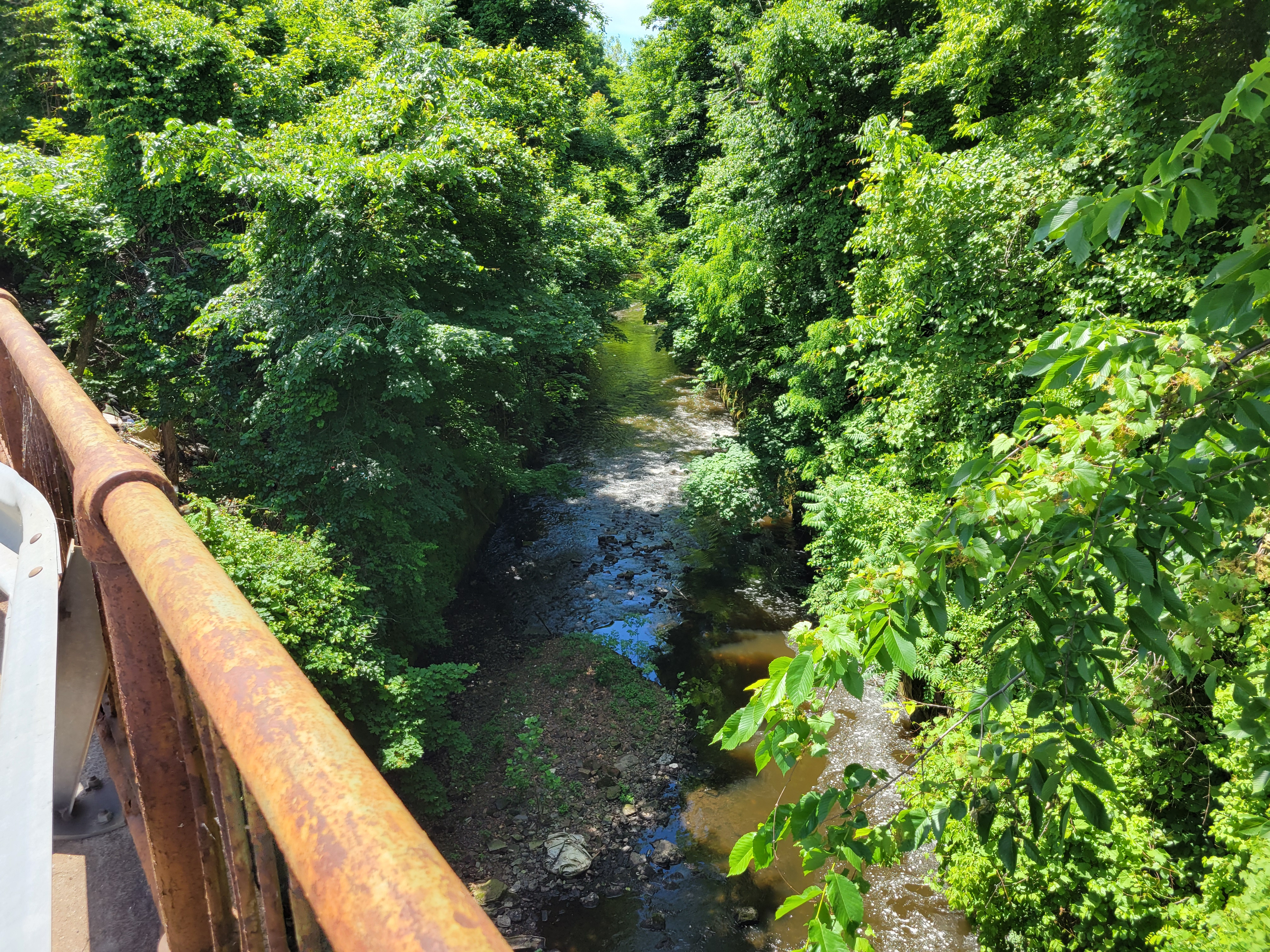
Mill River at Allen Street

The Mill River is a 1.25-mile-long (2.01 km) tributary of the Connecticut River in Springfield, Massachusetts. It flows from Watershops Pond (also known as Lake Massasoit) to its confluence with the Connecticut River. It is referred to as "The Miracle Mile" in a 2009 master's thesis that outlines possibilities for reclaiming the river's mouth as a recreational area. As of 2011, the final 350 feet (110 m) of the river, including its mouth, is confined in a pipe underneath Interstate 91, railroad tracks and a car dealership. Many Springfield residents have bemoaned the loss of the Mill River as a recreational area, and hope to gain greater access to both it and the Connecticut River in upcoming years. As it has for over a century, the Mill River serves as a barrier between Springfield neighborhoods. Surrounding it are some of the most densely urbanized locations in Springfield.

At the head of the Mill River there are steep stone retaining walls that were built to prevent the river's banks from degrading any further. The Mill River was once valued for its benefits to developing industry, but modern day incompatible land use is a hindrance to the river becoming a recreational area again. A 2009 master's thesis described a plan that could revitalize the Mill River and its surrounding neighborhoods by remaking the river as a recreational attraction, connecting the Connecticut River and the Basketball Hall of Fame with Watershops Pond and Springfield College.
