= Daisy-Head Mayzie =

Children's book by Dr. Seuss

- Original cover
- Author: By: Dr. Seuss
- Illustrator: with illustrations based on the sketches by: the author (reprint)
- Language: English
- Genre: Children's literature
- Publisher: Random House
- Publication date: February 5, 1995 (original); July 5, 2016 (republished)
- Publication place: United States
- Media type: Print (hardcover and paperback)
- ISBN: 0-679-86712-0
- OCLC: 30353431
- Dewey Decimal: [E] 20
- LC Class: PZ8.3.G276 Dai 1994
- Preceded by: Oh, the Places You'll Go!
- Followed by: The Secret Art of Dr. Seuss

Daisy-Head Mayzie is a children's book written by Dr. Seuss (the pen name of Theodor Seuss Geisel). It was published in 1995, as Geisel's first posthumous book. It was republished on July 5, 2016, with Geisel's original text and drawings.

== Plot ==
The book is about an 8-year old warmhearted schoolgirl named Mayzie McGrew who one day suddenly sprouts a bright white daisy from her head. It causes alarm in her classroom, family, and town, until an agent makes her a celebrity. Mayzie becomes overwhelmed and distraught over the situation and runs away. The Cat in the Hat, who serves as the narrator to this story, helps Mayzie to understand her problem. He persuades her to go back home, and the daisy eventually goes away, popping up back again on occasion. The book has a mini-song titled "Daisy-Head Mayzie" which her classmates chant.

== Adaptations ==
Prior to its publication, the book was adapted into an animated special for television by Hanna-Barbera in Los Angeles, California, produced in association with Tony Collingwood Productions in London, England, and Fil-Cartoons in Manila, Philippines. It premiered on February 5, 1995, on TNT. The special stars Henry Gibson (of Laugh-In fame) as the voice of The Cat in the Hat, Francesca Marie Smith (later of Hey Arnold! fame) as the voice of the title character and Tim Curry as the villain, Finagle. Four months later, on June 6, it was released on VHS by Turner Home Entertainment. The special can also be found as a bonus feature on MGM Animation/Visual Arts' Horton Hears a Who! (1970), which was released on a Deluxe Edition DVD by Warner Home Video on March 4, 2008.

=== TV special cast ===
- Francesca Marie Smith as Mayzie McGrew
- Henry Gibson as The Cat in the Hat
- Tim Curry as Finagle
- George Hearn as Mayor
- Lewis Arquette as Principal Gregory Grumm
- Jonathan Winters as Dr. Eisenbart
- Susan Silo as Miss Sneetcher
- B. J. Ward as Mrs. McGrew
- Paul Eiding as Mr. McGrew
- Robert Ridgely as Finch
- Benjamin Smith as Butch
- John Graas as Einstein

== Differences in the 2016 edition ==
In 2016, after the popularity of What Pet Should I Get?, the book was republished with Seuss' original text and illustrations. As such, there are several differences between the editions.

- The Cat in the Hat does not appear as the narrator.
- The characters are all designed differently and are given normal hairstyles, as opposed to the wild hairstyles in the 1995 edition.
- Instead of catching all of the bees in his hat, the police officer puts a fishbowl over Mayzie's head to protect her from the bees.
- Mrs. McGrew is a housewife instead of a welder.
- The plot in which the agent gives Mayzie a contract to be rich and famous is completely absent.
- Because of the absence of the Cat in the Hat, the daisy instead assures Mayzie that everyone loves her, and her flight with the Cat on the flying umbrella is not present.
- Mayzie is depicted as a brunette and wears a purple dress, as opposed to a blonde and wearing a pink dress in the 1995 edition.
