= Dr. Seuss Memorial =

Sculpture garden in Springfield, Massachusetts

Dr. Seuss National Memorial Sculpture Garden
- Location: Springfield, Massachusetts, United States
- Coordinates: 42°6′16.3692″N 72°35′14.3304″W
- Type: Sculpture garden
- Website: Springfield Museums

The Dr. Seuss National Memorial Sculpture Garden is a sculpture garden at the Quadrangle in Springfield, Massachusetts, which honors Theodor Seuss Geisel, better known as Dr. Seuss, who was born in Springfield in 1904. The monument was designed by Lark Grey Diamond-Cates, the author's stepdaughter, and created by sculptor and artist Ron Henson.

== History ==
Halfway through her Masters program, Diamond-Cates was approached by Joseph Carvalho and former Museums chairman Thomas Wheeler to help design a memorial for her step-father. She accepted, and spent six and a half years designing and creating the project.

The sculpture garden opened 1 June 2002. The opening ceremony was attended by Geisel's relatives including his widow Audrey Geisel, and Senator Ted Kennedy.

The adjacent The Amazing World of Dr. Seuss Museum includes an exhibit on the sculpture garden's creation.

== Statues ==
The sculpture garden features five large bronze statues:

- Dr. Seuss and the Cat in the Hat: The title character of The Cat in the Hat standing alongside Dr. Seuss at his desk.
- The Storyteller: A chair placed in front of a 10-foot-tall (3.0 m) book with the text of Oh, the Places You'll Go!, the title character from Gertrude McFuzz, and beside it, the Grinch and his dog, Max.
- Horton Court: Horton the Elephant from Horton Hears a Who! steps out of an open book accompanied by various ancillary characters from other Dr. Seuss stories, including Thing 1 and Thing 2 from The Cat in the Hat.
- The Lorax: The titular character from The Lorax stands on a tree stump with the book's refrain: Unless... This statue is located in front of the Springfield Science Museum, which features exhibits on global warming and environmental science.
- Yertle the Turtle: a 10-foot-tall (3.0 m) tower of turtles, from Yertle the Turtle, which introduces visitors to the Quadrangle from the arch on Chestnut Street.
