= Quadrangle (Springfield, Massachusetts) =

Coordinates: 42°6′13″N 72°35′7″W

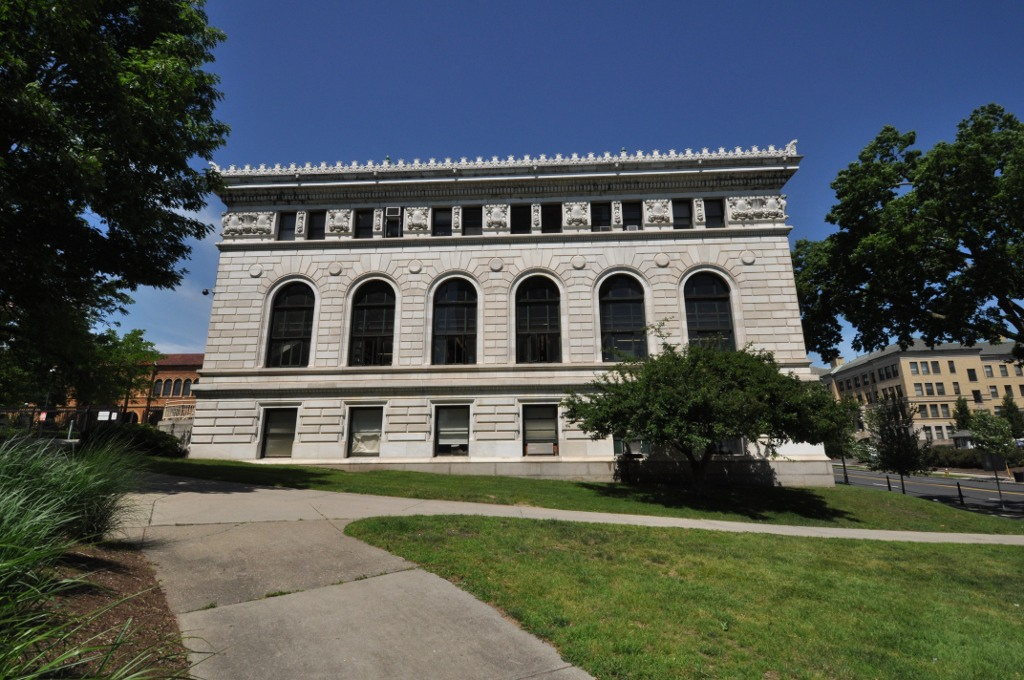
- Springfield City Library
- Location: Metro Center, Springfield, Massachusetts
- Type: Cluster of museums and cultural institutions

The Quadrangle is the common name for a cluster of museums and cultural institutions in Metro Center, Springfield, Massachusetts, on Chestnut Street between State and Edwards Streets.

The Dr. Seuss National Memorial Sculpture Garden, in the center of the Quadrangle, is surrounded by a park, a library, five museums, and a cathedral. A second cathedral is just on the Quadrangle's periphery.

== Merrick Park ==
On the corner of Chestnut and State Streets, Merrick Park is distinguished by sculptor Augustus Saint-Gaudens The Puritan, a statue depicting one of Springfield's settlers, Deacon Samuel Chapin. Springfield Central Library and Christ Church Cathedral are adjacent to the park.

== Springfield City Library ==
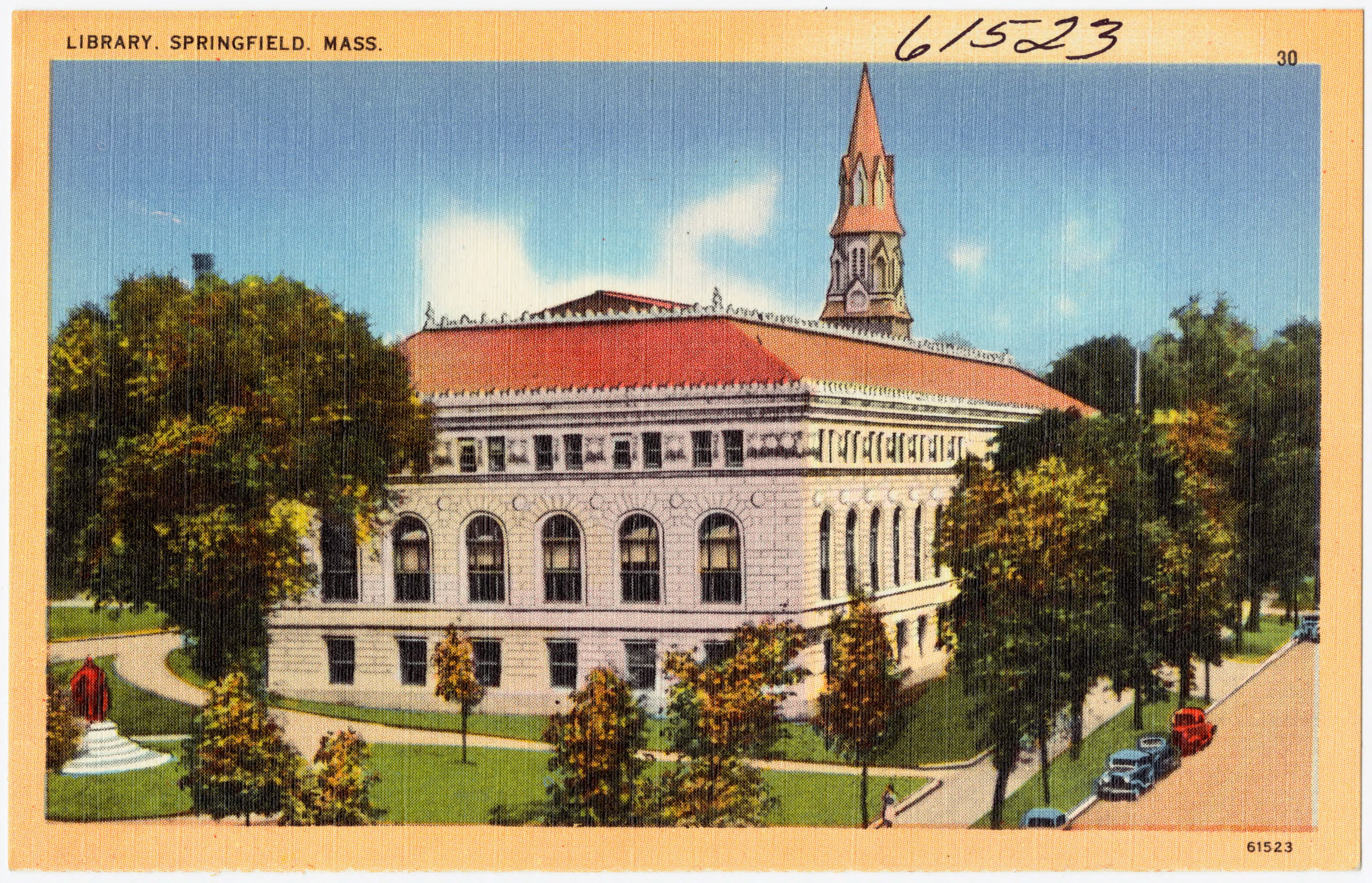
Library, 1930s

The Central Library, constructed in 1913, was paid for by Andrew Carnegie. It is the second library to be built at that location. Adult fiction and nonfiction are based in Rice Hall (named for William Rice), consisting of a main floor and mezzanine. Opposite Rice Hall is Wellman Hall (named for Hiller Crowell Wellman), where periodicals, foreign language materials, and the public computers are housed. The main circulation desk lies in the rotunda between the two halls. Young adult literature, children's literature, a community room, a computer lab, media materials, and a second circulation desk are on the first floor at street level.

== Cathedrals ==
The Roman Catholic St. Michael's Cathedral adjoins the neo-classical Springfield City Library at the southeast corner of the Quadrangle.

Also located near that edge of the Quadrangle is the Episcopal Diocese of Western Massachusetts' Christ Church Cathedral.

== Springfield Museums ==
Springfield Museums Corporation operates the Dr. Seuss Memorial and five museums on the Quadrangle. In 2013, the Springfield Museum consortium achieved national accreditation from the American Alliance of Museums, a distinction awarded to only 6% of national museums in the US. In September 2016, Springfield Museums was named as a Smithsonian affiliate, opening up new opportunities for cultural and historical exhibits, as well as educational programs.

=== George Walter Vincent Smith Art Museum ===
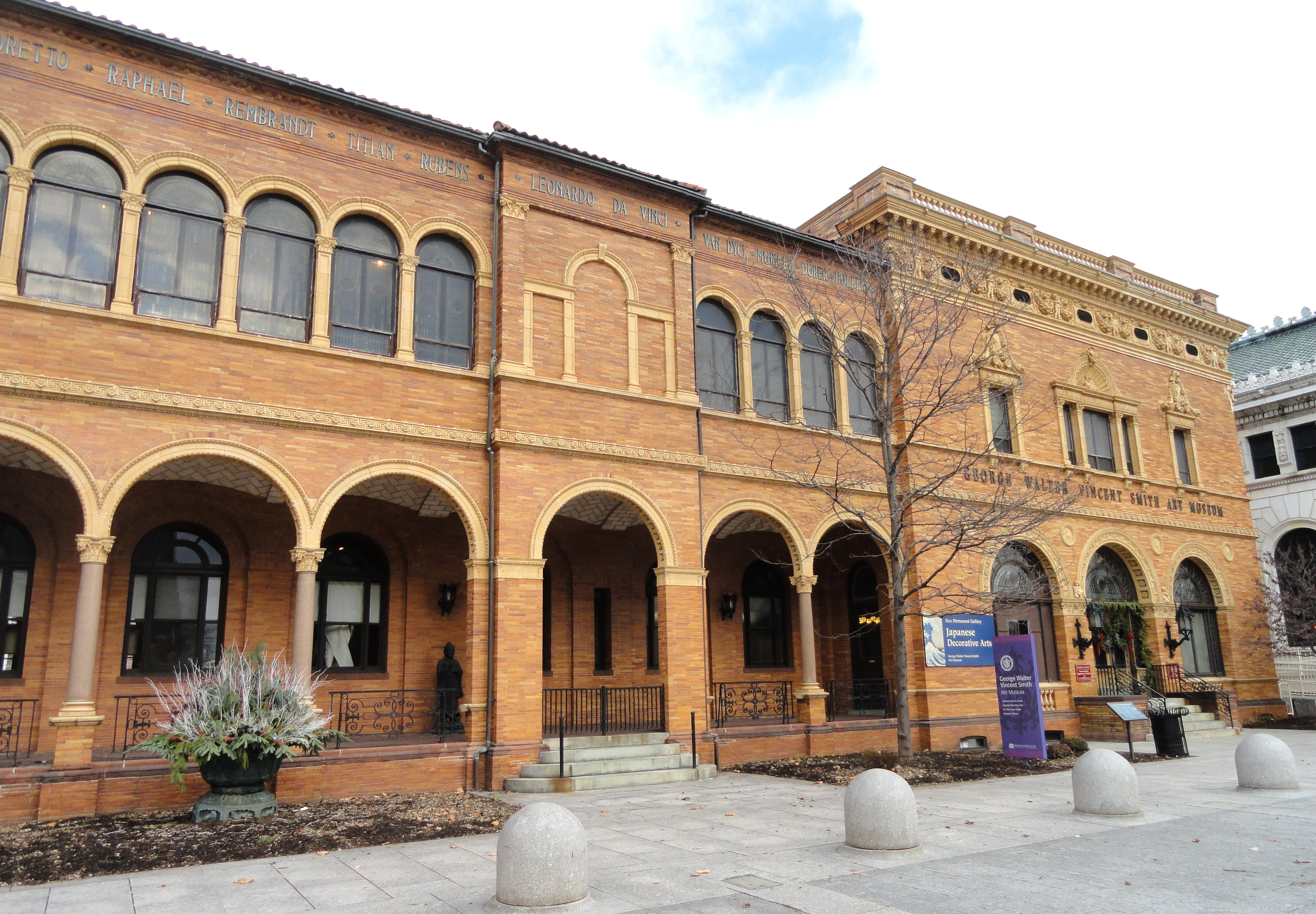
Smith Art Museum

The George Walter Vincent Smith Art Museum is the oldest museum on the Quadrangle. The museum is named for George Walter Vincent Smith and his wife, Belle, who bequeathed their notable collection to begin the museum. The building dates from 1895 and was designed by Renwick, Aspinwall & Renwick and Walter Tallant Owen.

The Ancient Treasures Gallery displays objects from ancient Egypt, China, Greece and Rome. The gallery presents Greek and Roman sculpture and ancient Chinese ceramics and bronzes. Greek pottery and glass from the George Walter Vincent Smith Collection complement the classical sculptures.

The Japanese Arms and Armor Gallery, in addition to holding Smith's extensive collection of East Asian armor, is the site of an ornate Shinto wheel shrine carved during the late 18th and early 19th centuries. Among other collections is a 150-piece holding of Chinese cloisonne work, one of the most extensive collections outside of China.

=== Michele and Donald D'Amour Museum of Fine Arts ===
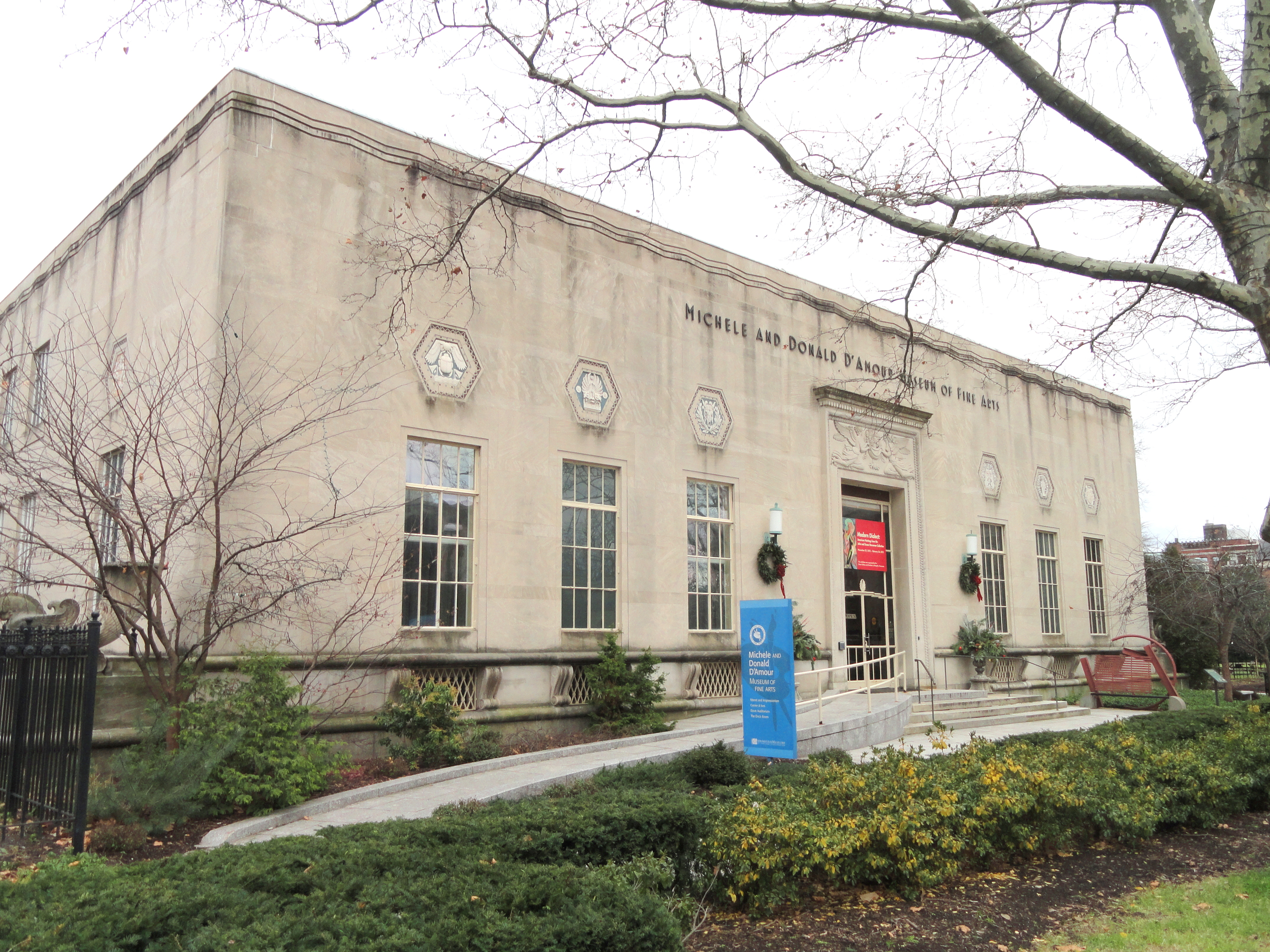
D'Amour Museum of Fine Arts

The Michele and Donald D’Amour Museum of Fine Arts features American and European works including those of Massachusetts native John Singleton Copley and lithographs of Currier and Ives. Works by Edgar Degas, Claude Monet, and others can be found in the European collection. The Museum features many interactive exhibits as well. It also has Late Medieval and Renaissance paintings by Spinello Aretino, Nicolás Francés, Domingo Valls, Pordenone, Daniele da Volterra (Diana), and Goswin van der Weyden. It also has Baroque and 18th Century paintings by Pierre Patel, Jacob Jordaens, Emanuel de Witte, Jan van Goyen, Ferdinand Bol, Jean-Étienne Liotard, Canaletto, and Giovanni Paolo Panini. There are also American paintings by Erastus Salisbury Field, Frederic Edwin Church, George Bellows, and Georgia O'Keeffe. There are also contemporary works of art by Helen Frankenthaler, Joseph Grillo, and Lisa Hoke. The museum also hosts Japanese prints and has the largest collection of Utagawa Kuniyoshi's work in the U.S.

=== Springfield Science Museum ===
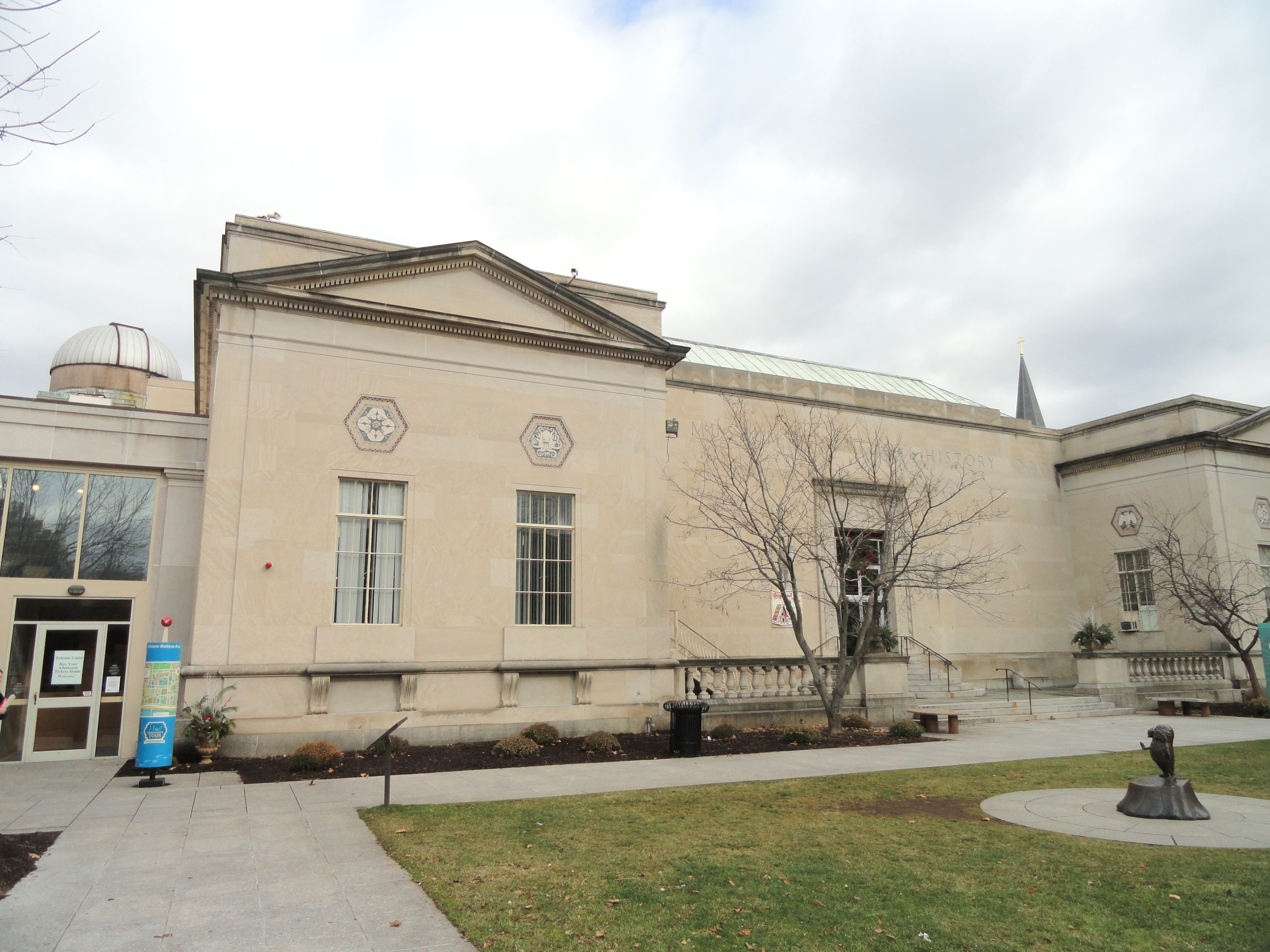
Springfield Science Museum

The Springfield Science Museum displays elements of natural and physical science from the Eco-Center featuring live animals, to the African Hall, which gives visitors a ground-sky perspective of an ecosystem on the Savannah. Dinosaur Hall includes a lifesize Tyrannosaurus rex model and skeletons from other dinosaurs, including a cast of Stegosaurus and both a legbone of Alamosaurus and fragment of a tyrannosaurid believed to represent a new species, both collected in a 1920s Amherst College expedition led by one Fred Brewster Loomis. The museum also features a planetarium – the longest operating projection planetarium in the United States, and one of the very few of the era not built by Zeiss – and earth science exhibits. Additionally, the museum has its own observatory with a 20-inch (51 cm) telescope that is periodically open to the public.

=== Dr. Seuss National Memorial Sculpture Garden ===
The Quadrangle's perimeter was at one time open to vehicles, but was closed off in the 1990s, becoming a pedestrian-only park. Soon after that, the Dr. Seuss National Memorial Sculpture Garden was opened. Several statues depicting Springfield native Theodor Geisel (Dr. Seuss) and many of his creations were sculpted and placed on the Quadrangle green.

=== Lyman and Merrie Wood Museum of Springfield History ===
The Lyman and Merrie Wood Museum of Springfield History opened in the fall of 2009 on the former site of famed painter James McNeill Whistler's childhood home. It tells the story of Springfield, and in particular, highlights its role as "The City of Progress" and "The City of Firsts". The collection features exhibits on the numerous inventions and pioneering manufacturing techniques innovated there, the city's role in American history, as well as examining Springfield in a broader context as a city during various eras, (e.g. different wars, several mass immigrations, and changing transportation technology). Exhibits of antique cars and firearms, formerly housed at the Connecticut Valley Historical Museum, showcase the city's various industries. Also included is a large number of items from the former Indian Motorcycle Museum.

The museum also houses the Springfield History Library and Archives, a collection of historical papers and documents, including genealogical records and over 20,000 books related to genealogy.

=== The Amazing World of Dr. Seuss Museum ===
The newest museum on the Quadrangle, opened in 2017, The Amazing World of Dr. Seuss Museum blends artifacts and information about the life and work of Dr. Seuss with interactive exhibits aimed at children. The museum is housed in the William Pynchon Memorial Building, formerly home of the Connecticut Valley Historical Museum, which closed in 2009.
