= The Amazing World of Dr. Seuss Museum =

Coordinates: 42.104°N 72.587°W

Amazing World of Dr. Seuss Museum
- Established: June 2017
- Location: Springfield, Massachusetts
- Type: Literary and children's museum
- Website: springfieldmuseums.org

The Amazing World of Dr. Seuss Museum is a museum in Springfield, Massachusetts, United States located in the William Pynchon Memorial Building, which until 2009 housed the Connecticut Valley Historical Museum. The museum opened in June 2017. It is located on the Quadrangle along with the Dr. Seuss National Memorial Sculpture Garden and other museums.

== History ==
=== Connecticut Valley Historical Museum ===
In 1927 a new building was constructed to hold the collections of "natural, civil, military, literary, ecclesiastical and genealogical materials" belonging to The Connecticut Valley Historical Society, which had previously stored its collections at the City Library. It was designed by local architect Max Westhoff.

By 2007 plans had been made to renovate the building and repurpose it for a Dr. Seuss themed installation (later expanded into a full museum). The materials hosted in the museum were moved to a nearby office building in 2009.

=== The Amazing World of Dr. Seuss Museum ===
In March 2015, the Springfield Museums announced the opening of the new Seuss-focused museum. At the time, plans were made to open the first floor of the museum in June 2016, with the second floor to follow in 2017. Ultimately, both floors opened in June 2017.

== Exhibits ==
The museum has several rooms on the main floor which contain a "Seussian version of Springfield", with interactive sculptures, exhibits, and original and reproduced artwork from Dr. Seuss. The upper level has original oil paintings, a recreation of Geisel's La Jolla studio, complete with his drawing board and other original items, and family and fan correspondence. The basement, called Cat's Corner, has art workspace and copies of Dr. Seuss Books to read.

=== Readingville ===
The Readingville Exhibit houses The ABC Wall, an interactive larger-than-life wall version of Dr. Seuss's ABC, which allowed children to touch various letters, hear the phonetic sound of the letter being pressed, and see the artwork from the book appear on the wall with the associated text below.

== Controversy ==
The Seuss Museum was set to host a Children's Literature Festival featuring three children's authors, Lisa Yee, Mike Curato, and Mo Willems on October 14, 2017. On October 5, the three authors posted a statement on their Twitter accounts explaining their reason for canceling, namely, a recently painted mural featuring a Chinese racial stereotype from Seuss' first book And to Think That I Saw It on Mulberry Street. The museum canceled the event and also decided to remove the mural. The event was not rescheduled despite the authors thanking the museum for its quick action and offering to fulfill their speaking engagements.
