= My Many Colored Days =

Book by Dr. Seuss

- Author: Dr. Seuss
- Illustrator: Steve Johnson; Lou Fancher
- Language: English
- Genre: Children's literature
- Publisher: Alfred A. Knopf
- Publication date: March 1, 1996
- Publication place: USA
- Media type: Print (hardcover, board book)
- Pages: 32
- ISBN: 0-679-87597-2
- OCLC: 164575524
- Dewey Decimal: [E] 20
- LC Class: PZ8.3.G276 My 1996
- Preceded by: The Secret Art of Dr. Seuss
- Followed by: Hooray for Diffendoofer Day!

My Many Colored Days is a children's book written by Theodor Geisel under the pen name Dr. Seuss. It features animals representing different emotions on different days. These include a horse, flamingos, a seal, a wolf, an anteater, a bee, a fish, and a bird.

Accompanying a manuscript Geisel wrote in 1974 was a letter outlining his hopes of finding "a great color artist who will not be dominated by me". Geisel saw his original text about feelings and moods as part of the "first book ever to be based on beautiful illustrations and sensational color".

It was published posthumously in 1996 by Alfred A. Knopf, after Geisel's death in 1991. It features paintings by Steve Johnson and Lou Fancher. A rhyming story, it describes each day in terms of a particular color which is in turn associated with a specific emotion. Based on a 2007 online poll, the National Education Association listed the book in its "Teachers' Top 100 Books for Children".
