= What Pet Should I Get? =

Book by Dr. Seuss

- Author: Dr. Seuss
- Cover artist: Dr. Seuss
- Language: English
- Genre: Children's literature
- Publisher: Random House
- Publication date: July 28, 2015; January 8, 2019 (special edition with behind-the-pages cut)
- Publication place: United States
- Preceded by: Horton and the Kwuggerbug and More Lost Stories
- Followed by: Horse Museum

What Pet Should I Get? is a Dr. Seuss children's book, posthumously published in 2015. Believed to have been written between 1958 and 1962, the book chronicles the adventures of Jay and Kay from Seuss' One Fish, Two Fish, Red Fish, Blue Fish in their attempts to buy a pet.

== Plot ==
In a pet store, a young brother and sister (Jay and Kay) are trying to choose a pet. They consider a vast array of possible pets as their deadline of noon approaches. Finally, they settle on a pet whose identity remains unrevealed.

== Background ==
After Theodor Seuss Geisel, who wrote as Dr. Seuss, died in 1991, his wife Audrey Geisel renovated their house in La Jolla, California. Geisel went through her husband's papers together with his assistant Claudia Prescott, donating most of his material to the University of California, San Diego. However, a few sketches and unfinished projects were collected in a box and left not donated. In October 2013, Geisel and Prescott examined the leftover sketches and projects closely for the first time; the materials included illustrations for alphabet flash cards, sketches collectively titled The Horse Museum, a folder of miscellaneous drawings labeled "Noble Failures", and the most complete project, a manuscript titled The Pet Shop consisting of 16 illustrations and accompanying pieces of typed text.

Cathy Goldsmith, a Random House associate publishing director who had been the art director for the previous six Dr. Seuss books and who is reportedly the last Random House executive to have worked directly with Seuss, examined the manuscript and judged it to date from between 1958 and 1962, in part because the brother and sister characters in the book are the same as in Seuss's 1960 book One Fish, Two Fish, Red Fish, Blue Fish. It is possible that Seuss conceived The Pet Shop first but eventually decided to use the characters in a less narrative-structured book instead and developed One Fish, Two Fish, Red Fish, Blue Fish around them.

The Pet Shop was reconstructed for publication by Goldsmith, who also colored the black-and-white illustrations. The reconstructed book was published by Random House in July 2015 as What Pet Should I Get?. Random House reported it would likely publish two additional volumes based on the other material found in the same box. The release of the book Horse Museum was announced in a 2019 press release.

== Reception ==
In The New York Times, Maria Russo gave What Pet Should I Get? a largely positive review, saying that "the book is, if not top-flight Seuss, a very good example of his particular genius for distilling both the spirit of his times and the timeless mind-set of children".
