= List of public art in Springfield, Massachusetts =

This is a list of public art in Springfield, Massachusetts, in the United States. This list applies only to works of public art on permanent display in an outdoor public space. For example, this does not include artworks in museums. Public art may include sculptures, statues, monuments, memorials, murals, and mosaics.

Image	Title / subject	Location and coordinates	Date	Artist / designer	Type	Material	Dimensions	Designation	Owner / administrator	Wikidata	Notes
	Bikers	Worthington Street	2011-2012	Robert Markey	Mosaic						
	Break Dancers	Worthington Street	2011	Robert Markey	Mosaic						
	Climbers and birds	Dwight and Worthington Street	2009-2010	Robert Markey	Mosaic						
More images	Civil War Monument	Court Square 42°6′4.95″N 72°35′18.6216″W			Monument						
	Dr. Seuss Memorial	Quadrangle 42°6′13.32″N 72°35′11.08″W			Sculpture garden						
	Duryea Redux	Pynchon Plaza	2021	Beth Crawford and Robert Dickerman	Sculpture						
More images	Statue of Miles Morgan	Court Square 42°6′4.4352″N 72°35′20.13″W	1882	Jonathan Scott Hartley	Statue						
	Mirror Mosaic Dancers	Dwight Street	2010-2012	Robert Markey	Mosaic						
	Pipe Wrench Dreams	Main Street	2017	James Kitchen	Sculpture						
More images	The Puritan	Quadrangle 42.10306°N 72.58527°W	1899	Augustus Saint-Gaudens	Statue	Bronze					
	Saxophone Players and Dancers	Worthington Street	2016	Robert Markey	Mosaic						
	Stone Dog	Forest Park 42.07671°N 72.566585°W	2013		Statue						
More images	William McKinley Monument	Court Square 42°6′0.5″N 72°35′23.15″W	1908	Philip Martiny	Monument						Also known as Fame Reaches for McKinley's Head.

== See also ==
- Murals of Springfield, Massachusetts
