= Bright Nights =

Bright Nights may refer to:

- Bright Nights (album), 2025 album by British indie pop band Allo Darlin'
- Bright Nights (film), 2017 German drama film directed by Thomas Arslan
- Bright Nights (Springfield), an annual holiday lights display held in Forest Park in Springfield, Massachusetts

== See also ==
- Bright Nights Dark Days, an album by Cavo
