= Thomas Arslan =

German-Turkish film director

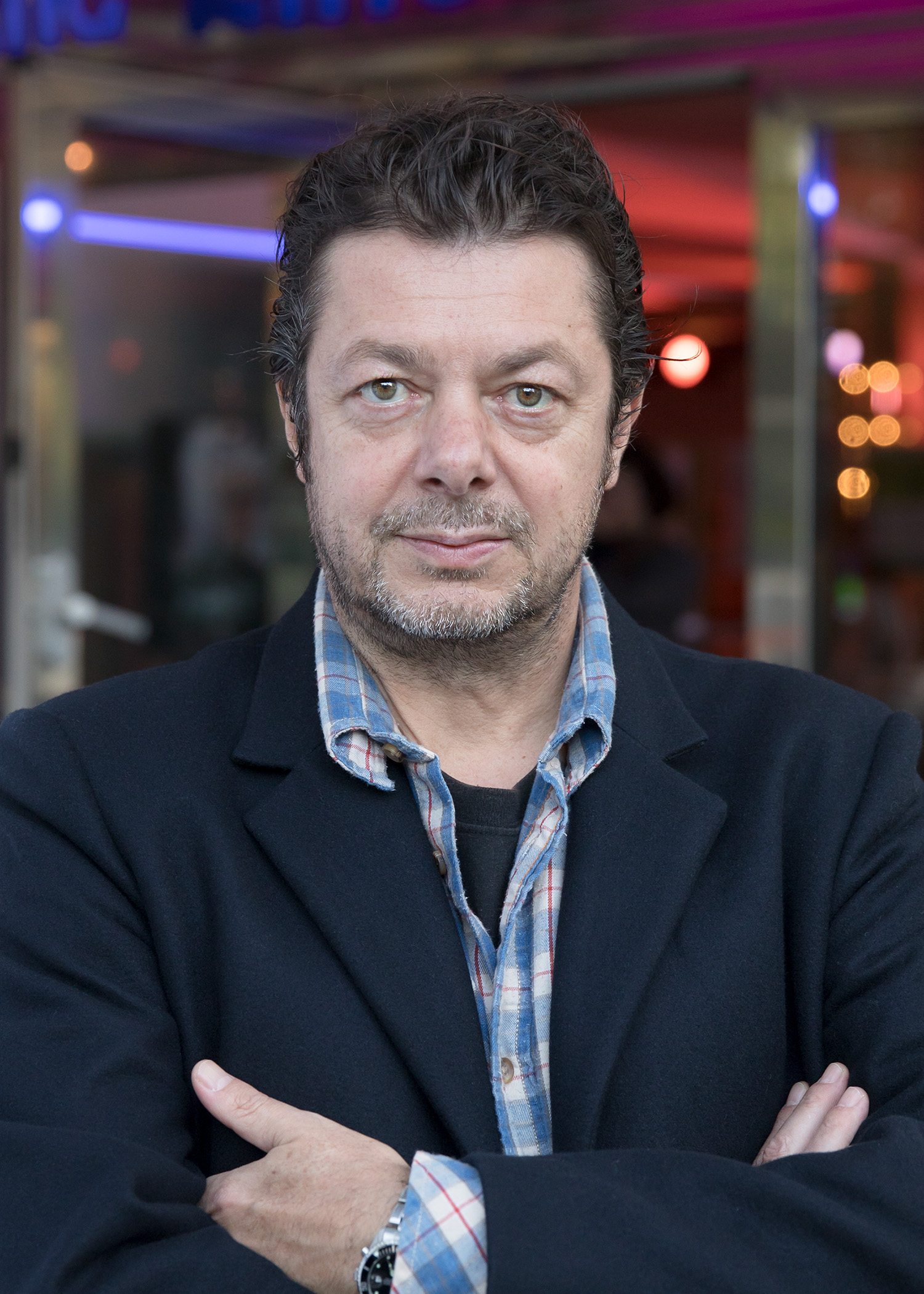
- Born: 16 July 1962 (age 64); Braunschweig, West Germany
- Occupation: Film director
- Years active: 1990-present

Thomas Arslan (born 16 July 1962) is a German film director and screenwriter. He is one of the directors of the Berlin School. He is best known for three films about young Turkish Germans in Berlin, and for the western Gold (2013). he has been a professor of narrative film at the Berlin University of the Arts since 2007.

== Early life and education ==
Arslan was born in Braunschweig to a German-Turkish family. He grew up in Essen, but lived in Ankara for four years as a child. He finished school in Essen in 1982. From 1986 to 1992 he studied at the German Film and Television Academy Berlin (DFFB).

== Career ==
Arslan's first film, Mach die Musik leiser (1994), was about teenagers in Essen. It was shown at the Berlin International Film Festival.

He then made three films about young people of Turkish descent in Berlin: Geschwister – Kardeşler (1996), Dealer (1999) and Der schöne Tag (2001). They are called his Berlin trilogy. The films use long, calm shots and feel close to documentary.Dealer won two prizes at the 1999 Berlinale.

In 2006 he made Aus der Ferne, a documentary about a trip through Turkey. He followed it with the family drama Ferien (2007). He later moved into genre films. Im Schatten (2010) is a crime film. Gold (2013) is a western starring Nina Hoss, about German emigrants on their way to the Klondike. It competed for the Golden Bear.

Bright Nights (2017) follows a father and son on a trip through Norway. Its star, Georg Friedrich, won the Silver Bear for Best Actor at the Berlinale.

In 2024 Arslan released Scorched Earth, a sequel to Im Schatten.

== Filmography ==
| Year | Title | Notes |
|---|---|---|
| 1994 | Mach die Musik leiser | Graduation film; Berlinale Panorama |
| 1996 | Geschwister – Kardeşler | Berlin trilogy, part 1 |
| 1999 | Dealer | Berlin trilogy, part 2; FIPRESCI Prize, Berlinale Forum |
| 2001 | Der schöne Tag | Berlin trilogy, part 3 |
| 2006 | Aus der Ferne | Documentary |
| 2007 | Ferien | Berlinale Panorama |
| 2010 | In the Shadows | |
| 2013 | Gold | Berlinale Competition |
| 2017 | Bright Nights | Berlinale Competition; Silver Bear for Best Actor (Georg Friedrich) |
| 2024 | Scorched Earth | World premiere at the 74th Berlin International Film Festival |
