= Bright Nights (Springfield) =

Holiday celebration in Massachusetts

Bright Nights is an annual holiday lights display held in Forest Park in Springfield, Massachusetts. The event is run collaboratively between Springfield's Department of Parks, Buildings & Recreation Management and local nonprofit Spirit of Springfield. The event usually runs from Thanksgiving week until January 1 or 2, contributing to significant vehicular congestion throughout the Forest Park neighborhood.

== History ==
=== Development ===
In February 1995 Patrick Sullivan, the Springfield Parks Director, found a brochure from a North Carolina company which created light displays. Sullivan, who was also inspired by simple holiday displays he had seen at Forest Park during his childhood, decided he wanted a series of light displays for the park. That spring, Sullivan and Judith Matt, president of Spirit of Springfield, worked with designer John Catenaci to design the displays. The displays were initially invested in by Peter Picknelly, the chairman of Peter Pan Bus Lines at the time.

Construction began in August, with only three months before the opening date. The plans for the event were officially revealed during a press conference on September 7, 1995. The displays themselves began arriving in October.

Further issues arose when it came to actually assembling the displays and powering them, as electricity access within the park was limited. Ultimately, five and a half miles of trenches were dug on either side of the route in order to provide the electricity via underground wiring.

=== 1995–2010 ===
The event's opening night was November 24, 1995. Tickets were six dollars, and 1,488 cars attended. Although its planned closure date was January 7, the event ran until January 14, 1996, by which point some of the displays were buried due to heavy snowfall. 74,859 vehicles attended in total, far beyond the initial estimates of 40,000 vehicles. Original displays included the Nativity scene (which was installed on December 13, after not initially present due to concerns about legality), Never Never Land, North Pole Village, Poinsettia Candles, Seussland, Spirit of the Season, Toy Land, Victorian Village, and the Winter Woods.

In 1996 the Barney Mansion, Noah's ark, Leaping frog, Elf package toss, and Elves polishing sleigh displays were added, as well as a gift shop. In 1998 the Kwanza display was added. In 2000 the poinsettia displays at the opening gate and the Monopoly displays were added. The American flag and the Garden of Peace display were added to the route in 2001; the latter was a memorial to those lost during the September 11 attacks. The final "Happy Holidays Springfield" display was also added this year.

A 2003 study estimated that Bright Nights had brought in $7.3 million to the regional economy.

The Jurassic World display was added in 2005. Santa's cottage was added in 2006. In 2007 LED light replacement began, which would continue until 2022.

The event brought in $8,212 between the 2008 and 2009 seasons.

2009 saw the opening of the new Winter Garden display to celebrate the event's 15th anniversary, which further extended the route by a quarter mile. The 2010 season added the Game of Life spinner to Toy Land.

=== 2011–2020 ===
Preparations for the 2011 season faced some difficulty due to an October snowstorm, which downed trees and branches and damaged some displays; however, the event was able to open on time. By 2012 the event had doubled the number of light displays from 2004.

2014 marked the event's 20th season. A carousel was added to Santa's Magical Forest that year.

2015 saw 36,899 cars attend the event.

Two notable developments occurred shortly before the 2016 season officially began. In mid-November 2016, the Springfield Park Commissioner requested a review of the Spirit of Springfield organization's finances after learning through a Springfield Republican news article about increased revenue and staff pay raises just months after the organization successfully secured a 3-year $79,000 annual discount from the City of Springfield for Bright Nights labor payments to the city. Spirit of Springfield President Judith Matt added to the controversy by criticizing The Republican on a local radio appearance, then refusing to comment to The Republican. The Republican ultimately published a story in December 2016 detailing a $203k Spirit of Springfield profit for fiscal 2016 that was aided by the city labor discount.

Also in mid-November 2016, the John J. Shea Bright Nights Technical Training Facility was opened. The facility would work on equipment used during the lights display and would allow local students to learn trades such as electrical work and welding. 2016 saw a dip in revenue from the event, which was attributed to special dates with lower ticket prices to make the event more affordable. However, attendance had actually increased to 39,969 cars.

Opening night in 2017 was the most well attended in the event's history with 1,400 cars driving through. Starting in 2017, The Zoo in Forest Park has collaborated with the Parks Department and Spirit of Springfield to open the zoo (which is normally closed for the winter) for one or two nights during Bright Nights.

In 2018 a new display honoring the Springfield Thunderbirds was unveiled. In 2019 another display, this one of a lion, was added nearby to commemorate the recent opening of MGM Springfield.

In 2020, the event was subject to restrictions due to the COVID-19 pandemic. All tickets had to be purchased online in advance, and no in-person activities, such as Santa's Village and the Bright Nights Gift Shop, were open. The event's hours were also shortened, with the front gate shutting at 8:45pm. To make up for the loss in hours, the city allowed the display to remain open for three more days in January. Despite the restrictions, more than 45,000 cars drove through the display, making it one of the most successful years since 2000.

=== 2021–2022 ===
In 2021 the lightning ceremony for opening night was attended by Charlie Baker, the then-governor of Massachusetts. This marked the first time the state's governor had attended the event since 1995.

In summer 2022, Bright Nights was one of 20 attractions in the state to be given a grant by the Destination Development Capital Grants program. The $49,350 grant allowed event organizers to replace the old blizzard tunnel and improve the gift shop. In 2022, all lights were officially switched to LED bulbs. Expected attendance was more than 40,000 cars.

== Route ==
The event boasts more than 675,000 lights along a three-mile drive. As of 2019, the event had 420 display pieces.

The entrance to the event features poinsettia lights, and displays depicting an American flag (which has been sponsored by Big Y since 2001), a Nativity scene, a kinara, and a channukiah. From there, cars continue to the Winter Garden section. After a few displays depicting scenes from Peter Pan, the route continues into Seussland, which features displays of some of the characters and buildings from the books of Dr. Seuss, also known as Theodor Geisel, who was born and raised in Springfield.

Cars are given a choice of parking in Santa's Magical Forest or continuing on the route. The Bright Nights Gift Shop and Santa's Cottage, which hosts meet and greets with Santa Claus, are located near the parking lot.

Continuing on the route, cars pass the Garden of Peace, which includes angels watering flowers. The Jurassic World section follows, which has an assortment of dinosaurs and an erupting volcano.

After passing the dinosaurs, cars head down a hill into the Victorian Village section, which features a facade of the Everett Barney mansion. After driving through the Winter Woods under several arches of leaping deer, cars enter the North Pole Village. Following this section is the final section, Toy Land, which features some games from Milton-Bradley, which was based in the region. The final displays are four large candles surrounded by a poinsettia wreath and a display of Santa's sleigh flying over the city with the text "Happy Holidays Springfield".

== Special events ==
The event has had some horse-drawn wagon and carriage rides on the route.

=== Bright Nights 5K Road Race ===
There is a five kilometer race held on one night of the event, dubbed "Springfield's favorite race" by Spirit of Springfield. The event started in 2006. Only 500 tickets to run in the event are available, and they often sell out within days or hours of being released. The lights display is closed to vehicles for the duration of the race, and runners enjoy a soup dinner after they finish. Proceeds from the event go to Spirit of Springfield.

In 2020 the race was not held in person due to the COVID-19 pandemic. Runners did have an option to run the race "virtually", and could upload their times and photos of themselves after running the five kilometers in their own neighborhoods.

=== Military and First Responders Night ===
The night, which gives free admission to military members and first responders, was added in 2004. In 2021, the night also included frontline workers for the pandemic.

=== Supper with Santa ===
This event, which is hosted at the Barney Carriage House, started in 2007.

== Awards ==
In 2001, the event received the title of "Best Tourism Creative Execution - Events" from the Massachusetts Office of Travel and Tourism.

The American Bus Association included Bright Nights on its 2000, 2009, 2011, and 2014 "Top 100" lists.

Yahoo! Travel included the event on its 2012 list of "America's best places for holiday lights".

In 2019, USA Today put Bright Nights in fourth place on their list of the top ten best public holiday lights displays; in 2020 the event was placed tenth. The event has been nominated for the award four times in total.

In 2022, Bright Nights was dubbed "Best Christmas Light Display" in Massachusetts by Travel + Leisure.
