= God of Happiness (film) =

- Directed by: Dito Tsintsadze
- Written by: Dito Tsintsadze
- Produced by: Oliver Damian; Birgit Kemner; Elaine Niessner; Tommy Niessner; Guka Rcheulishvili; Temur Ugulava
- Starring: Lasha Bakradze; Elie James Blezes; Nadeshda Brennicke; Tina Meliava; Ufuk Bozkurt
- Cinematography: Ralf M. Mendle
- Edited by: Martin Menzel
- Production companies: 27 Films Production; East End Film; Manny Films; Koro Pictures
- Distributed by: Kinostar
- Release dates: November 2015 (Biberach); 23 June 2016
- Running time: 93 minutes
- Countries: Germany; France; Georgia
- Language: German

God of Happiness is a 2015 German-French-Georgian black comedy film directed by Dito Tsintsadze and starring Lasha Bakradze, Elie James Blezes, Nadeshda Brennicke, Tina Meliava and Ufuk Bozkurt.

== Plot ==
The film tells the story of a former film director Georgi (Lasha Bakradze) originally from Georgia who plays minor parts in crowd-scenes. He also earns money on the side as a pimp of Ngudu (Elie James Blezes) – his black friend whose clients are wealthy older women with tastes for BDSM.

The two unsuccessful men are always short of money and live in a dingy apartment in an industrial area on the outskirts of Stuttgart. Ngudu uses magic to communicate with his mother, who lives in an African village. They have so little money that Georgi is even forced to sell Ngudu's beloved God of Happiness statue.

Georgi's 15-year-old daughter Tina (Tina Meliava) who lives in Canada with her mother is coming to visit him for the first time in 10 years. He has always pretended to her that he was a successful actor.

Now Georgi must stage a fake life of a rich movie star for Tina. Ngudu's contacts with rich women help him find a villa and an expensive car for Georgi. Georgi convinces his acquaintance, the wooden-legged coke-snorting vaudeville actress Mia (Nadeshda Brennicke) to play his German wife.

Tina arrives, she is quiet, observant and claims to not speak any German. She also has secrets of her own.

Later their plan becomes in danger when Mia's jealous ex-boyfriend Rocco (Ufuk Bozkurt) arrives and stirs up trouble.

But Tina is not easily deceived and the more Giorgi tries to hold on to his lies, the more the situation threatens to spiral out of control.

== Cast ==
- Lasha Bakradze as Giorgi
- Elie James Blezes as Ngudu
- Nadeshda Brennicke as Mia
- Tina Meliava as Tina
- Ufuk Bozkurt as Rocco

== Production ==
This film is very important to me…maybe even too personal, but this could make things even stronger!

— Dito Tsintsadze.

There were some differences in the original script. Georgi's character's original name was Guram. Tina was originally written as a son named Rati.

The filming began on 6 August 2013 in Stuttgart. Initially the title was Wettbewerb (Contest). The filming took four weeks.

Some lines which the politically incorrect Mia says in the film were improvised by Nadeshda Brennicke.

== Reception ==
=== Critical response ===
The film was praised for its acting and deadpan humor which some critics compared with the work of Aki Kaurismäki.

Jürgen Haase, member of the Biberach Film Festival said that "At the first glance the film appears to be a small-scale story which you think you know but instead develops into one which always has exceptional situations, poetic ideas and a laconic wit where life seems like a game".

=== Awards ===
In 2015 it won the grand prize of Biberach Film Festival – the Golden Beaver. Dito Tsintsadze won the Best Director prize at the VIFF Vienna Independent Film Festival and Ralf M. Mendle received the Best Cinematography award for his work on the film in the year 2016.

== References to other films ==
The film references the 2000 film Lost Killers by Dito Tsintsadze which also stars Lasha Bakradze and Elie James Blezes.
