= Scorched Earth (2024 film) =

German crime film

- Teaser poster
- German: Verbrannte Erde
- Directed by: Thomas Arslan
- Written by: Thomas Arslan
- Produced by: Anton Kaiser; Florian Koerner von Gustorf; Michael Weber
- Starring: Mišel Matičević
- Cinematography: Reinhold Vorschneider
- Edited by: Reinaldo Pinto Almeida
- Music by: Ola Fløttum
- Production companies: Schramm Film Koerner; Weber Kaiser production; WDR and ARTE production
- Distributed by: Piffl Medien GmbH [de]; The Match Factory (World Sales)
- Release dates: 20 February 2024 (Berlinale); 18 July 2024 (Germany)
- Running time: 101 minutes
- Country: Germany
- Language: German

Scorched Earth (German: Verbrannte Erde), a 2024 German crime film directed by Thomas Arslan is a sequel to 2010 film In the Shadows. Mišel Matičević is reprising his role as Trojan, a professional criminal who specializes in robberies.

It was selected in the Panorama section at the 74th Berlin International Film Festival where it was screened on 20 February 2024. Subsequently, it was released on 18 July 2024 in theaters in Germany by Piffl Medien.

== Synopsis ==
Trojan, a skilled crook, comes back to Berlin after a botched up coup twelve years ago. Short of money and desperate he joins an attractive art heist through agent Rebecca. A painting by Caspar David Friedrich is to be stolen from a museum for Victor, who has other ideas. With getaway driver Diana, his former companion Luca and the young Chris the coup is attempted. But the well-made plan goes awry and he has to fight for his life.

== Cast ==
- Mišel Matičević as Trojan
- Marie Leuenberger as Diana
- Alexander Fehling
- Anja Schneider as Nadia
- Leonard Proxauf as bob
- Holger Doellmann as jeweler
- Hannah Schutsch as restorer
- Tim Seyfi
- Marie-Lou Sellem
- Katrin Röver
- Bilge Bingül

== Production ==
Principal photography began on 25 October 2022 in Essen and Berlin. Filming ended on 30 November 2022 with filming locations in the regions of Berlin and North Rhine-Westphalia in Germany.

== Release ==
Scorched Earth had its world premiere on 20 February 2024, as part of the 74th Berlin International Film Festival, in Panorama. It was released on 18 July 2024 in theaters in Germany by Piffl Medien.

The Cologne-based sales agent The Match Factory has international sales rights to the film.

It was screened at Lichter Filmfest Frankfurt International, Frankfurt on 17 April 2024. It also made it to the Meeting Point of the 69th Valladolid International Film Festival and screened on 24 October.

== Reception ==
Andreas Köhnemann reviewing in Kino Zeit at Berlinale rated the film with four stars and wrote, "Scorched Earth is competently made genre cinema that, in its reduction, ensures the highest level of tension."

Susanne Gottlieb reviewing the film at Berlinale for Cineuropa wrote, "The narrative elements of friendship, trust, loneliness and betrayal are found in Scorched Earth, and Arslan understands how to handle these basic human conflicts, while also knowing how to keep his audience engaged right up until the final minute."

== Accolades ==
Award	Date	Category	Recipient	Result	Ref.
Berlin International Film Festival	25 February 2024	Panorama Audience Award for Best Feature Film	Thomas Arslan	Nominated	
