= Daniel Brandt =

German musician

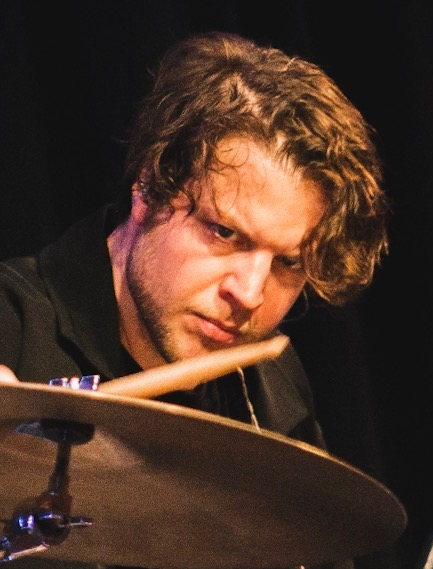
- Brandt in 2019
- Education: Academy of Media Arts Cologne
- Occupation: Electronic musician

Daniel Brandt is a German composer, drummer, and filmmaker from Wiesbaden based in London and Berlin. He is a member of the ensemble Brandt Brauer Frick and also records as a solo artist for the British record label Erased Tapes.

== Biography ==
Brandt was raised in Wiesbaden; his father was a rock drummer and his grandparents on his mother's side were a pianist and an opera singer. He graduated from the Academy of Media Arts Cologne in 2011 with a degree from the film and television studies department. As a student there, he founded the ensemble Brandt Brauer Frick with classmates Jan Brauer and Paul Frick; Brandt plays percussion instruments. The trio released its first full-length album in 2010. After graduating, Brandt toured and recorded with the ensemble and founded his own record label, Gym Records; he also did video live event production for entertainment and news websites such as the BBC and the Guardian. He went on to do record production work as well, including for German musician Anna F., whom he dated in 2017.

His debut release as a solo artist, Eternal Something, was recorded in multiple locations, including a cabin in Germany and Joshua Tree National Park in the United States. Brandt had initially wanted the album to be composed entirely of cymbal sounds, but changed his mind as he composed and recorded for it. The album was released in March 2017 on the Erased Tapes label. Brandt played all the instruments on Eternal Something except for hang drum, trombone, and cello. Stylistically, the album was described by Pitchfork Media as a cross between modern classical and electronic dance music.

Brandt followed Eternal Something with Channels, his second full-length, in October 2018. The Line of Best Fit noted influences from Detroit techno, Tangerine Dream, and Steve Reich on the record.

== Discography ==
- Eternal Something (Erased Tapes, 2017)
- Channels (Erased Tapes, 2018)
- Without Us (Erased Tapes, 2025)
