= Mišel Matičević =

German actor (born 1970)

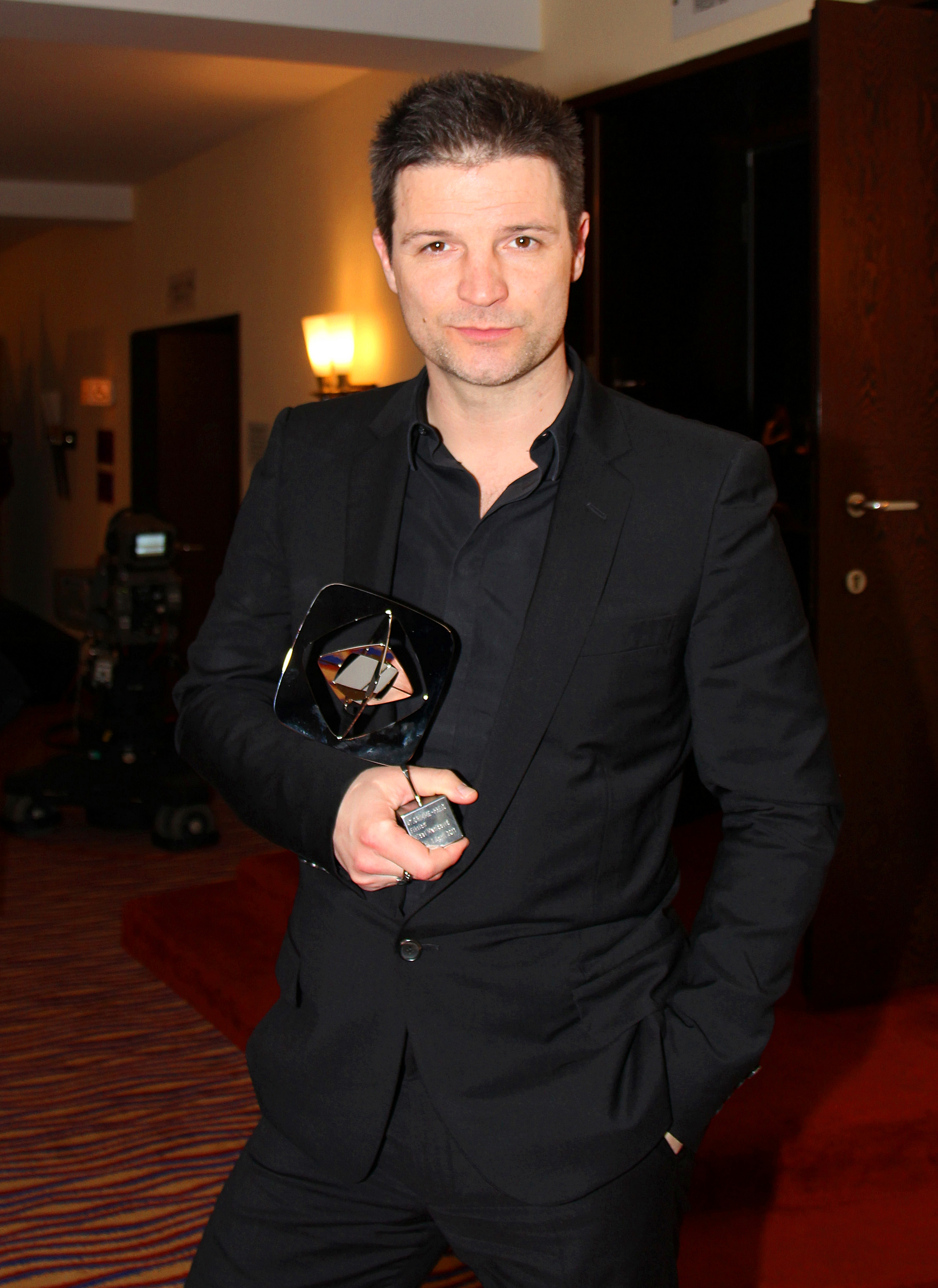
- Matičević in 2011
- Born: 22 April 1970 (age 55); West Berlin, West Germany
- Occupation: Actor

Mišel Matičević (German: [miˈʃɛl maˈtiːtʃɛvɪtʃ], Croatian: [miʃêl matǐːtʃevitɕ]; born 22 April 1970) is a German film, television, and theater actor of Croatian descent.

== Early life and education ==
Matičević was born in West Berlin to Croatian parents who were guest workers in West Germany. Following his parents' divorce, he lived with his mother in Berlin-Spandau. He was initially a trouble maker in childhood and would get in fistfights at school. He refused to join the school's theater group, feeling it was only for kids who were trying to "suck up" to the teachers. However, Matičević saw the 1983 film Danton with Gérard Depardieu and was inspired by Depardieu's performance to become an actor.

He studied acting from 1994 until 1998 at the Konrad Wolf Film University of Babelsberg in Potsdam. While there, he performed with the Berliner Ensemble at the Deutsches Theater in Berlin and the Kleist Theater in Frankfurt Oder.

== Career ==
Since 1996, Matičević has acted in several crime series and films for German television and cinema. He was awarded the Best Actor Award at the 2000 Thessaloniki International Film Festival for his performance in Lost Killers (1999). In 2007, he played the role of the German poet and novelist Clemens Brentano in the film Das Gelübde, which depicts Brentano's encounter with the stigmatised nun Anne Catherine Emmerich.

Matičević's first international role was in the TNT miniseries The Company in 2006, a show about the CIA in which he played a fictional Hungarian poet called Arpad Zelk, a leader of the Hungarian uprising in 1956.

== Personal life ==
Since 2014, Matičević has been an ambassador for Deutschlandstiftung Integration (Germany Integration Foundation), which promotes and celebrates ethnic diversity in Germany, to support the children of guest workers. He has said: "Guest worker children have always existed and will always exist. I deliberately don't say migrants, but guest worker children, because I am also a guest worker child and have learned so much. I just do not like the term migrant. And I'm glad to be able to pass on some of my knowledge and experience."

== Selected filmography ==
=== Film ===
List of film appearances, with year, title, and role shown
Year	Title	Role	Notes
2000	Lost Killers	Branco	
2008	A Year Ago in Winter	Aldo	
2009	Effi Briest	Major Crampas	
2010	In the Shadows	Trojan	
2011	Kokowääh	Rob Kaufmann	
2012	My Beautiful Country	Ramiz	
2014	The King's Surrender	Mendes	
2020	Exile		
2024	Scorched Earth	Trojan	World premiere at the 74th Berlin International Film Festival

=== Television ===
List of television appearances, with year, title, and role shown
Year	Title	Role	Notes
1998	Tatort	Carlo	1 episode
1998	Wolffs Revier		
1999	Schwarz greift ein		
2000–2001	Die Cleveren		2 episodes
2001	HeliCops – Einsatz über Berlin		
2002	Das Duo	Benno Polenz	2 episodes
2003	Doppelter Einsatz		
2003	Inspector Rex		
2003	Alarm für Cobra 11 – Die Autobahnpolizei		
2004	Leipzig Homicide		
2005	Mit Herz und Handschellen		
2005	K3 – Kripo Hamburg		
2005	Abschnitt 40		
2007	Tatort	Milan Popov	1 episode
2007	The Company	Arpad Zelk	
2010	Im Angesicht des Verbrechens	Misha	
2011	Tatort	Dr. Christoph Rubner	1 episode
2011	Polizeiruf 110	Ole Mahler, prosecutor	1 episode
2012	Fast Forward		
2013	Tatort	Ante Mladec, valet	1 episode
2013–2014	Die Chefin		2 episodes
2014	Der letzte Bulle		
2015	Schuld nach Ferdinand von Schirach		
2015/2017	Tatort	Simic/Roman Eggers	2 episodes
2017	Babylon Berlin	Edgar Kasabian	
2018	Tatort	Nenad Ljubic/Nikola/Mike Liebknecht	2 episodes
2018	Dogs of Berlin	Tomo Kovac	
2021	The Billion Dollar Code	Juri Müller	4 episodes
2022	Close to Home: Murder in the Coalfield	Maik Briegand	6 episodes
