= Leonard Proxauf =

Austrian actor

- Born: 27 November 1995 (age 29); Berlin, Germany
- Occupation: Actor
- Years active: 2006–present

Leonard Proxauf (born 27 November 1995) is an Austrian actor, best known for his role as Martin in the film The White Ribbon.

== Life and career ==
Proxauf was born in Berlin. His mother is Austrian actress and artist agent Katja Proxauf. He started filming at the age of 9. His first minor role was the character of young Behrendt in the 2006 film Lohn deiner Angst. Proxauf booked his first major role in 2006. He played Jonas Block in the 2006 film Nevermore. In 2008 he played the small role of Christian Buddenbrook (played as an adult by August Diehl) in the literary film The Buddenbrooks.

The previous peak in Proxauf's acting career was the role of the reverend's son Martin in Michael Haneke's historical drama The White Ribbon (2009). For the European co-production, which tells of mysterious incidents in a north German village on the eve of the First World War, the 14-year-old won the Young Artist Award.

Proxauf will be seen in spring 2011 in the German television (ZDF) crime series The Inspector and the Sea as the police inspector's son, Niklas. He will also appear in a television (ZDF) film Der Test. In 2011 Proxauf filmed a guest leading role in the German TV crime series Tatort, which was aired on German TV in April 2012 and a lead role in the movie Everyday Objects which will be released in autumn 2012.

== Awards ==
Year	Award	Category	Work	Result	Ref.
2010	Young Artist Award	Best Young Actor in an International Feature Film	The White Ribbon	Won	

== Filmography ==
Film and television
Year	Title	Role	Notes
2006	Lohn deiner Angst	Young Behrendt	
2006	Nevermore	Jonas Block	
2008	Buddenbrooks	Young Christian Buddenbrook	
2009	The White Ribbon	Martin	Young Artist Award; Best Performance in an International Feature Film - Leading Young Actor (shared with Leonie Benesch)
2010	Gömböc	Paul	Short film
2010	The Inspector and the Sea	Nicklas	TV series — 2 episodes
2011	Dear Mr. Starr	Anton	Short film
2012	Tatort	Paul Tremmel	TV series — 1 episode
2012	Operation Sugar	Florin	
2013	Everyday Objects	Felix	
2014	Safari		Short film
2015	Pein	Leo	Short film
2015	No Comment	Thomas	
2015	Shed My Skin	Christoph	
2015	SOKO Wismar	Tim Brandt	TV series — 1 episode
2015	Leipzig Homicide	Noah Hausmann	TV series — 1 episode
2017	Die Eifelpraxis	Max Bogner	TV series — 1 episode
2024	Scorched Earth	Bob	World premiere at the 74th Berlin International Film Festival
