= Gun-Shy (2003 film) =

- Directed by: Dito Tsintsadze
- Written by: Dirk Kurbjuweit; Dito Tsintsadze
- Produced by: Christine Ruppert
- Starring: Fabian Hinrichs; Lavinia Wilson; Johan Leysen; Christoph Waltz
- Cinematography: Manuel Mack
- Music by: Dito Tsintsadze; Gio Tsintsadze
- Release date: September 5, 2003 (Toronto International Film Festival)
- Running time: 105 minutes
- Country: Germany
- Language: German

Gun-Shy (German: Schussangst) is a 2003 German crime drama film directed by Dito Tsintsadze.

== Summary ==
The protagonist of Dito Tsintsadze's drama is a loner whose life drastically changes after he meets a stunning but strange girl. Prior to meeting Isabella, Lukas, a young guy who does "meals on wheels" instead of military service, had few friends and led a mundane life. Soon after befriending him, the fascinating girl reveals to Lukas that she has a sexual relationship with her stepfather. He develops an obsession to liberate Isabella by killing the man.

== Plot ==
Conscientious objector Lukas works as a "meals-on-wheels" delivery driver as an alternative to compulsory military service. He leads a rather sad and lonely life. Riding a bus, he encounters strangely fascinating Isabella, who slips him a "Help me!" note. Lukas ends up falling in love with her.

The note she slipped to Lukas is revealed to be in reference to sexual abuse she has endured from her stepfather. Lukas finds himself rethinking his pacifist beliefs. He decides to get a gun to protect or save Isabella from her stepfather.

Lukas gets into the sights of a police detective investigating the theft of a boat. Sensing the violent energy pent up in Lukas, the detective checks in on him repeatedly. Lukas manages to procure a precision rifle, and he begins to practice handling it and mentally prepare himself for the killing. This forces him to question his deepest beliefs as a conscientious objector. Unable to overcome his inhibitions, he recoils from the last step - he is gun-shy.

Isabella's stepfather conducts seminars on anxiety, which Lukas also visits. He is present when the stepfather dies of a heart attack during a lecture. After this, Lukas sees and hears nothing more about Isabella. He leaves a message on her mailbox disclosing that he intended to kill her stepfather, but it goes unanswered.

Eventually Lukas overcomes his fear of shooting and directs his lethal intent at a new target.

== Cast ==
- Fabian Hinrichs - Lukas Eiserbeck
- Lavinia Wilson - Isabella
- Johan Leysen - Isabella's stepfather Romberg
- Christoph Waltz - Johannsen
- Ingeborg Westphal - Sieveking
- Axel Prahl - night swimmer
- Thorsten Mertens - Krausser

== Awards ==
The film won the Golden Seashell at the San Sebastián International Film Festival in 2003.
