= Nevermore (2006 film) =

- Directed by: Toke Constantin Hebbeln
- Screenplay by: Nina Vukovic; Toke Constantin Hebbeln
- Produced by: Manuel Bickenbach
- Starring: Leonard Proxauf; Rolf Becker; Manni Laudenbach; Sylvester Groth
- Cinematography: Felix Novo de Oliveira
- Production companies: Filmakademie Baden-Württemberg; Frisbeefilms
- Release date: 23 October 2006
- Running time: 63 minutes
- Country: Germany
- Language: German

Nevermore, German: NimmerMeer, is a 2006 film written and directed and co-written by Toke Constantin Hebbeln. The film was largely produced and shot by students of the Filmakademie Baden-Württemberg.

== Plot synopsis ==
The film is in the form of a fairy tale, set in 19th century rural Germany, although location shooting was actually in Denmark. A young boy called Jonas Block (Leonard Proxauf) loves the magical stories told to him by his father, Helge (Rolf Becker), an impoverished fisherman. After his father dies, the orphaned Jonas is taken in by the austere clergyman Pfarrer Ekdahl (Sylvester Groth), but is subjected to harsh discipline and neglect. When a travelling circus arrives in the village, the ringmaster, Grido (Manni Laudenbach), befriends Jonas and teaches him to believe in the power of dreams and imagination.

== Awards ==
- 2006 Best New Director Promotional Award for Toke Constantin Hebbeln, Hof International Film Festival
- 2006 German Film Promotional Award for Manuel Bickenbach, Hof International Film Festival
- 2006 Best Foreign Drama Festival Prize for Toke Constantin Hebbeln, Hollywood International Student Film Festival
- 2007 Producer prize for Manuel Bickenbach, Sehsüchte, Potsdam
- 2007 Honorary Foreign Film for Toke Constantin Hebbeln, 34th Annual Student Academy Awards, Academy of Motion Picture Arts and Sciences
- 2007 Rated "particularly valuable", Filmbewertungsstelle Wiesbaden
