= My Beautiful Country =

Die Brücke am Ibar
- Directed by: Michaela Kezele
- Written by: Michaela Kezele; Momčilo Mrdaković
- Produced by: Gabriela Sperl
- Starring: Zrinka Cvitešić; Mišel Matičević
- Edited by: André Bendocchi-Alves; Stine Sonne Munch
- Music by: Gerd Baumann; Martina Eisenreich; Gregor Hübner
- Distributed by: Chamade; Movienet; Lighthouse Home Entertainment
- Release date: 2012
- Running time: 88 minutes
- Country: Germany
- Languages: Serbian language German intertitles

Die Brücke am Ibar (English festival release title My Beautiful Country) is a 2012 German film directed by Michaela Kezele, set in 1999 during the Kosovo War. The film stars Serbian, Bosnian and Croatian actors Zrinka Cvitešić, Mišel Matičević, Andrija Nikcevic, and Nebojša Đorđević. The film received a Special Mention, German Cinema New Talent Category at the Munich Film Festival - Bayerischer Filmpreis 2013 – Young Talent Award, Audience prize at the Biberach Film Festival 2012, the Audience Award at the Arras Film Festival and the Diploma for Best Film at the Pula Film Festival. It also won the Torch Award for best film at the 14th Pyongyang International Film Festival.

== Plot ==
Kosovo, 1999. As the civil war between Serbs and Albanians rages, hatred has replaced tolerance, and towns are brutally divided along ethnic lines. The young Serbian widow Danica (Zrinka Cvitešić) lives with her two sons Vlado (Andrija Nikčević) and Danilo (Miloš Mesarović) in a predominantly Serbian community close to a small town which the River Ibar divides into an Albanian and a Serbian section. The death of Danica's husband at the hands of the Albanians has left profound traces in the family. Little Danilo has not spoken a word since, and Vlado has become a hooky-playing loner who dreams of owning a bright blue bicycle. In order to be able to afford it, he dives into the Ibar every day to catch fish which the kiosk owner buys from him for a few coins. In spite of the war, everyone in the community strives to lead normal lives. But one day, Danica returns from town to find a seriously injured Kosovo-Albanian soldier, Ramiz (Mišel Matičević), in her house. Though aware that he is on the run from the Serbian militia, Danica takes Ramiz in and nurses him...

== Cast ==
- Zrinka Cvitešić as Danica
- Mišel Matičević as Ramiz
- Andrija Nikčević as Vlado
- Miloš Mesarović as Danilo
- Ema Simovic as Nana
- Ana Marković as Milena
- Miloš Timotijević as Igor
- Danica Ristovski as Jelena
- Slavko Štimac as Kiosk owner
- Ljubomir Bandović as Bicycle shop owner
