= The Zoo In Forest Park =

The Zoo In Forest Park and Education Center
- Interactive map of The Zoo In Forest Park and Education Center
- Date opened: 1894
- Location: Springfield, Massachusetts, USA
- Land area: 4 acres (1.6 ha)
- No. of animals: 200+ (2020)
- Annual visitors: 55,000 (2018)
- Memberships: Zoological Association of America (ZAA)
- Director: Sarah Tsitso
- Website: https://www.forestparkzoo.org

The Zoo In Forest Park and Education Center, also known as the Forest Park Zoo, is a nonprofit zoo situated in Forest Park, Springfield, Massachusetts. It spans an area of four acres and is home to a variety of exotic, native, and endangered species.

== History ==
The Zoo in Forest Park opened in 1894 and was initially run by the city's Parks Department. Animals at the zoo in its first decade included badgers, a bald eagle, bears, a Brazilian marmoset, boars, a buffalo, cockatoos, deer, doves, finches, Java pigeons, a pair of Indian leopards, lions (named Caesar and Calpurnia), lynxes, macaws, monkeys, an ostrich, prairie dogs, a rabbit, red-faced apes, timber wolves, toucans, waterfowl, and a wildcat. Domestic animals included cattle, horses, sheep, and Angora goats. Many of the animals were purchased from the animal show market of Coney Island, although some were donated.

It was not until 1923 that the zoo began systematically labeling animals with their species, name, and origin.

For thirty years, the zoo was curated by Theodor Robert Geisel, father of famous author and illustrator Theodor Seuss Geisel. While working at the zoo, the elder Geisel occasionally gave his son antlers, beaks, and horns from deceased zoo animals, which Seuss would purpose for a rogue taxidermy art collection he titled Unorthodox Taxidermy. The zoo also inspired Seuss's acclaimed children's book If I Ran the Zoo (1950).

During World War II the zoo replaced the standard beef given to carnivores with horse meat. The smaller animals were fed grain, acorns, and stale bread along with their standard vegetables.

Well-known animals over the years included Jiggs the chimpanzee (until 1967), Snowball the polar bear (1951-1979), and Morganetta the elephant (1965-1980). Both Jiggs and Snowball were taxidermied and donated to the Springfield Science Museum.

The zoo faced financial difficulties in the 1970s, leading to many of the animals being sold off. In 1976 the zoo received negative media attention as the result of their inclusion in a book titled Living Trophies: A Shocking Look at the Conditions in America's Zoos. In 1979 a proposal for a new $2.7 million zoo was unveiled, but it received little public support. In 1980 the Springfield Parks Commission officially voted against the proposal.

In early 1982 the zoo was officially demolished in the name of aesthetic improvements. However, a zoo did remain in Forest Park: the James P. Heady Kiddieland Zoo, a petting zoo, which was relocated to elsewhere in the park. After the closing and demolition of the original Forest Park Zoo, the Kiddieland Zoo was often referred to as the Forest Park Zoo. It was eventually expanded, and in 1986 the zoo received a $1 million grant from the Massachusetts government for the redevelopment and relocation of the zoo.

In June 2016 one of the zoo's guenon monkeys, Dizzy, escaped his enclosure and made his way into Forest Park. He was re-captured several days later.

The zoo temporarily closed in response to the COVID-19 pandemic, but it was able to re-open with restrictions in June 2020.

In 2023 one of the zoo's screech owls, Clint Screechwood, won BonusFinder.com's 'Superb Owl' contest, which came with a $5000 prize for the zoo.

== Operations ==
The zoo operates from late March until early November.

During the hottest days of summer, some animals are kept inside, with the floors of their enclosures kept free of hay, and staff provide animals with ice.

=== Programs ===
==== Adopt an Animal ====
The Zoo offers the opportunity to become closer to the animals by 'adopting them': assisting in supporting the cost of their food and care. Any individual or group can adopt an animal. Most animals are adopted by more than one person or group.

The program launched in 1989 as a way to raise money for animals' food and veterinary care.

== Animals ==
Most of the animals at the zoo (~85%) are unable to be released in the wild due to injury, illness, or familiarity with humans.

Animals that currently reside at the Zoo In Forest Park and Education Center include:

- African bullfrog
- African common toad
- African pygmy hedgehog
- Alpaca
- American alligator
- American beaver
- Arctic fox
- Argentine black and white tegu
- Axolotl
- Baby Dahl sheep
- Bald eagle (-1913, 2019-)
- Ball python
- Barred owl
- Bearded dragon
- Bennett's wallaby
- Black-handed spider monkey
- Blue-and-yellow macaw
- Blue-tongued skink
- Boa constrictor
- Bobcat
- California kingsnake
- Catalina macaw
- Chinese water dragon
- Common degu (2019-)
- Corn snake
- Cottontail rabbit
- Coyote
- Dromedary camel
- Dumeril's boa
- Emu
- Fennec fox
- Ferret
- Flemish giant rabbit
- Gray fox (2019-)
- Green iguana
- Grey parrot
- Groundhog
- Huarizo
- Indian peafowl
- Leopard
- Leghorn chicken
- Llama
- Long-tailed chinchilla
- Madagascar hissing cockroach
- Miniature donkey
- Miniature horse
- Miniature mule
- Miniature rex rabbit
- Moluccan cockatoo
- Nigerian dwarf goat
- North American porcupine
- Narragansett turkey
- Painted turtle
- Patagonian cavy
- Pekin duck
- Plush-crested jay
- Poitou donkey
- Pot-bellied pig
- Pygmy goat
- Raccoon
- Red-and-green macaw
- Red-eared slider
- Red-footed tortoise
- Red-tailed hawk
- Red fox
- Rhode Island red chicken
- Ring-tailed lemur
- Russian tortoise
- Screech owl
- Serval (2018-)
- Severe macaw
- Short-tailed opossum
- Sika deer
- Silkie chicken
- Six-banded armadillo
- Spotted Leopard Gecko
- Striped skunk
- Sulcata tortoise
- Sulphur-crested cockatoo
- Swedish blue duck
- Timber wolf
- Umbrella cockatoo
- Virginia opossum
- White's tree frog
- Yellow-bellied slider

Species that previously resided at the zoo include:

- Antelope
- Chimpanzee, until 1967
- Elephant, until 1980
- Elk
- Gazelle
- Polar bear, until 1979
- Rhinoceros
- Toucan

== Events ==
=== Brew at the Zoo ===
Brew at the Zoo is an annual fundraiser featuring local breweries, held since 2017.

=== Eggstravaganza ===
Eggstravaganza is the zoo's annual Easter event, held the Saturday before Easter.

=== Spooky Safari ===
Spooky Safari is the zoo's annual Halloween event. Stations are set up within the zoo for trick-or-treating, and additional activities like crafts and face painting are also offered. This event is the successor to "Halloween Happening", which first occurred in 1988.

=== Wine Safari ===
Wine Safari is an annual fundraiser event held since 2018, where guests taste test different wines and are able to meet animals from the regions where the different wines are produced.

== Awards ==
- 2021: Educational Award of Excellence; Zoological Association of America
- 2022: Educational Award of Excellence; Zoological Association of America

== See also ==
- Forest Park (Springfield, Massachusetts)
- Stone Dog, sculpture near the zoo's entrance
