= A Heavy Heart =

2015 film

- Directed by: Thomas Stuber
- Written by: Thomas Stuber
- Starring: Peter Kurth
- Cinematography: Peter Matjasko
- Release dates: 12 September 2015 (TIFF); 17 March 2016 (Germany)
- Country: Germany
- Language: German

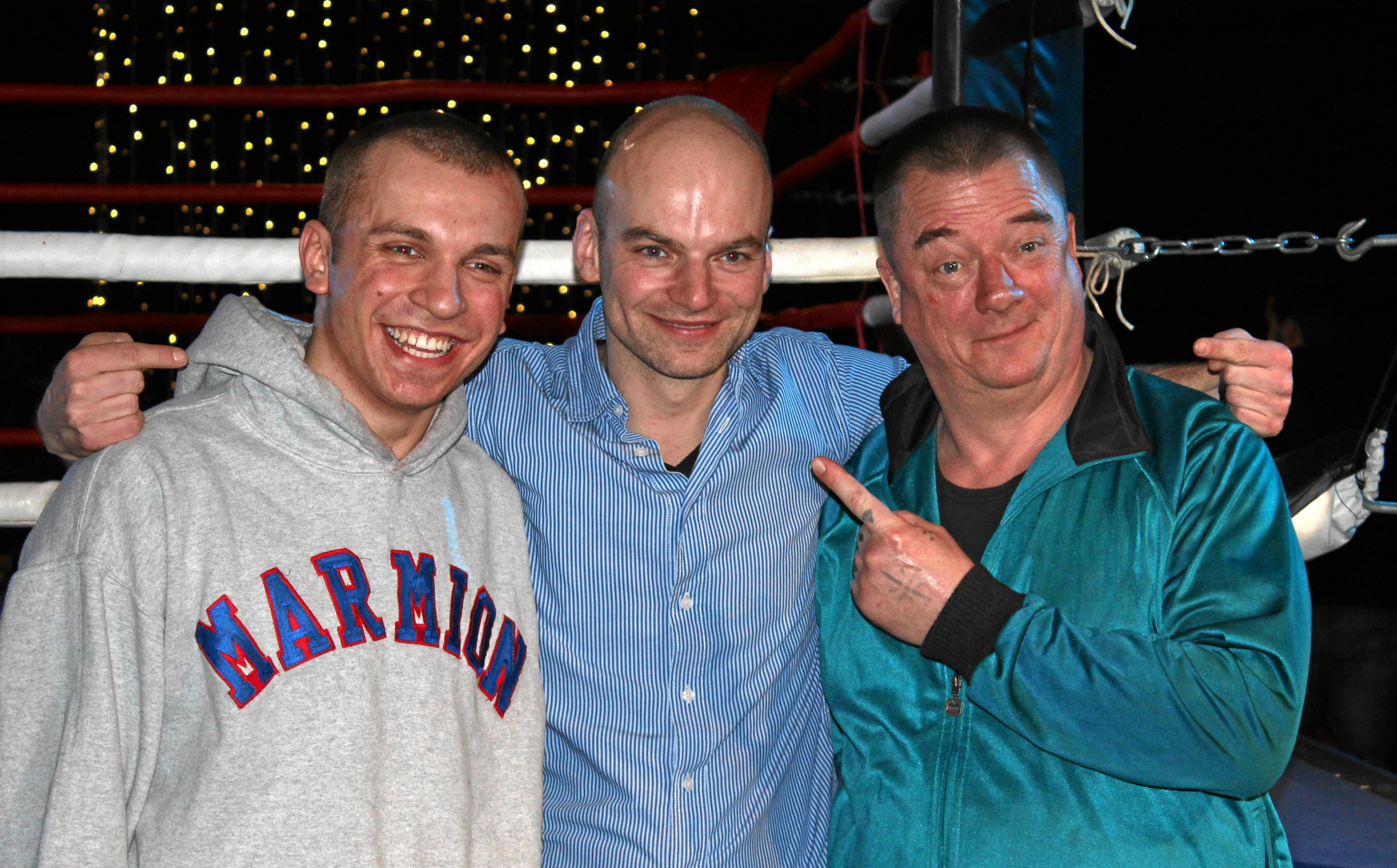
Edin Hasanovic, Thomas Stuber and Peter Kurth on the set of A Heavy Heart.

A Heavy Heart (German: Herbert) is a 2015 German drama film directed by Thomas Stuber. It was screened in the Contemporary World Cinema section of the 2015 Toronto International Film Festival.

== Plot ==
The former East German professional boxer Herbert earns his living as a debt collector and bouncer. Besides, he trains the upcoming boxer Eddy. At the first time Herbert gets muscle cramps, he tries to cover them up, but eventually he is diagnosed with ALS. Now he has to learn to live with restrictions, cramps and a wheelchair while his former environment has no need for him. His protégé Eddy also finds a new coach. His girlfriend Marlene accompanies him on his way. For years his work had been more important to him than his family. Now he tries to get to know his daughter Sandra and his granddaughter Ronja and to reconcile.

== Production ==
Herbert was produced by Departures Film and made in co-production with deutschfilm, Mitteldeutscher Rundfunk, ARTE and Hessischer Rundfunk. The film was supported by Mitteldeutsche Medienförderung, Deutscher Filmförderfonds, Beauftragte für Kultur und Medien, Kuratorium junger deutscher Film and Filmförderungsanstalt.

Herbert is the first feature-length film by Thomas Stuber. The film represents Stuber's second collaboration with Departures Film, following the short film Von Hunden und Pferden. As in Stuber's previous works Von Hunden und Pferden and Teenage Angst, Peter Matjasko was responsible for the camera. Stuber wrote the screenplay together with Leipzig-based author Clemens Meyer, who already wrote the original short story of Von Hunden und Pferden.

The film was shot in Leipzig and Halle in 35 days in the spring of 2014. Actor Peter Kurth worked up 16 kilograms of muscle mass for the role and starved it off during filming to portray Herbert's decline. The film was therefore filmed in chronological order. Kurth's acting starts out strongly physical and becomes more and more restricted until it is almost limited to the face. When Herbert also loses his voice, the acting is completely limited to his eyes.

Director Thomas Stuber sees the film as a reverse boxing film. In the classic American boxing film, he says, there is a young guy from nowhere who works hard, fights his way to triumph, and wins recognition and happiness. Herbert, on the other hand, is a film about the decline of a once great boxer.

Wild Bunch/Senator Film released Herbert in German theaters nationwide in spring 2016. Picture Tree International was handling worldwide distribution.

== Cast ==
- Peter Kurth as Herbert
- Lena Lauzemis as Sandra
- Lina Wendel as Marlene
- Edin Hasanović as Eddy
- Marko Dyrlich as Mark
