= Dito Tsintsadze =

Georgian film director

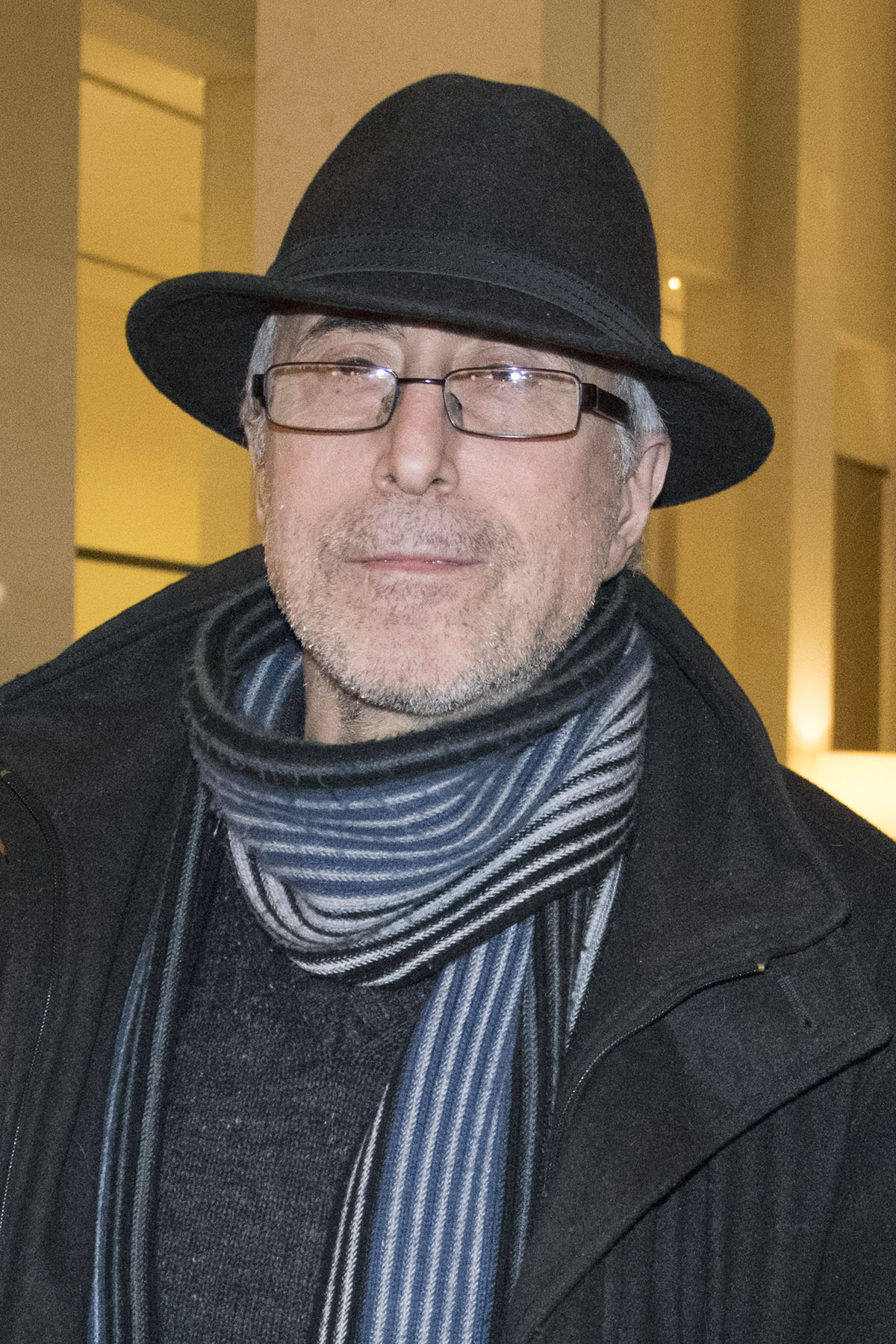
- Dito Tsintsadze in 2017
- Born: Dmitri Tsintsadze; 2 March 1957 (age 69); Tbilisi, Georgia
- Occupations: Film director, screenwriter
- Years active: 1988-present

Dito Tsintsadze (Georgian: დიტო ცინცაძე; born 2 March 1957) is a Georgian film director and screenwriter. He has directed thirteen films since 1988. His film Lost Killers was screened in the Un Certain Regard section at the 2000 Cannes Film Festival. In 2007 he was a member of the jury at the 29th Moscow International Film Festival. Starting from the year 1996 he lives and works in Berlin.

== Biography ==
From 1975 to 1981 he studied film directing at the Shota Rustaveli Theatre and Film University under Eldar Shengelaia and Otar Iosseliani. Until 1989 he worked as an assistant director in the Kartuli Pilmi film studio. In 1990 he made his first feature film Guests, then worked for the private film production company Shvidkatsa. In 1993 for the film Zgvardze, which paraphrases the civil war in Georgia he received the Silver Leopard at the Locarno Film Festival and the Golden Eagle at the International Black Sea Nations Film Festival in Tbilisi.

Between 1993 and 1996 Tsintsadze worked for an Italian film production. In 1996 he got a Nipkow film fellowship to Berlin, then lived with his family in Georgia and Germany. These personal experiences influenced the plot of Lost Killers (2000), a film about five migrants who spend their lives in a red-light district of Mannheim. He received a special jury award – the Silver Alexander at the Thessaloniki Film Festival and the main prize at the Cottbus Film Festival. For the film Gun-Shy, a story about a young amorous man who loses his grip on reality leading up to a murder, in 2003 he was awarded at the San Sebastián International Film Festival in Spain with the Golden Shell and at the Tbilisi International Film Festival with the Golden Prometheus.

Since then he lives entirely in Berlin. In 2005 Dito Tsinstadze authored together with the Georgian writer and director Zaza Rusadze the screenplay for the film The Man from the Embassy and directed it in Georgia. The Man from the Embassy portrays the connection of a German embassy official to a local. Lead actor Burghart Klaußner was awarded the best male actor with the Golden Leopard at the Locarno Film Festival. Dito Tsintsadze and Zaza Rusadze won at the Mar del Plata International Film Festival the Silver Astor Award for Best Screenplay.Argentine Film Critics Association reviewed The Man from the Embassy as the best film of the festival. In 2007 he did the TV movie Reverse in Georgia. In 2008 his feature film Mediator was selected as the official Georgian entry for the Best Foreign Language Film nomination at the 2009 Academy Awards.

In 2011 Dito Tsintsadze gave the CineMerit Award at the Munich International Film Festival to his former mentor Otar Iosseliani.

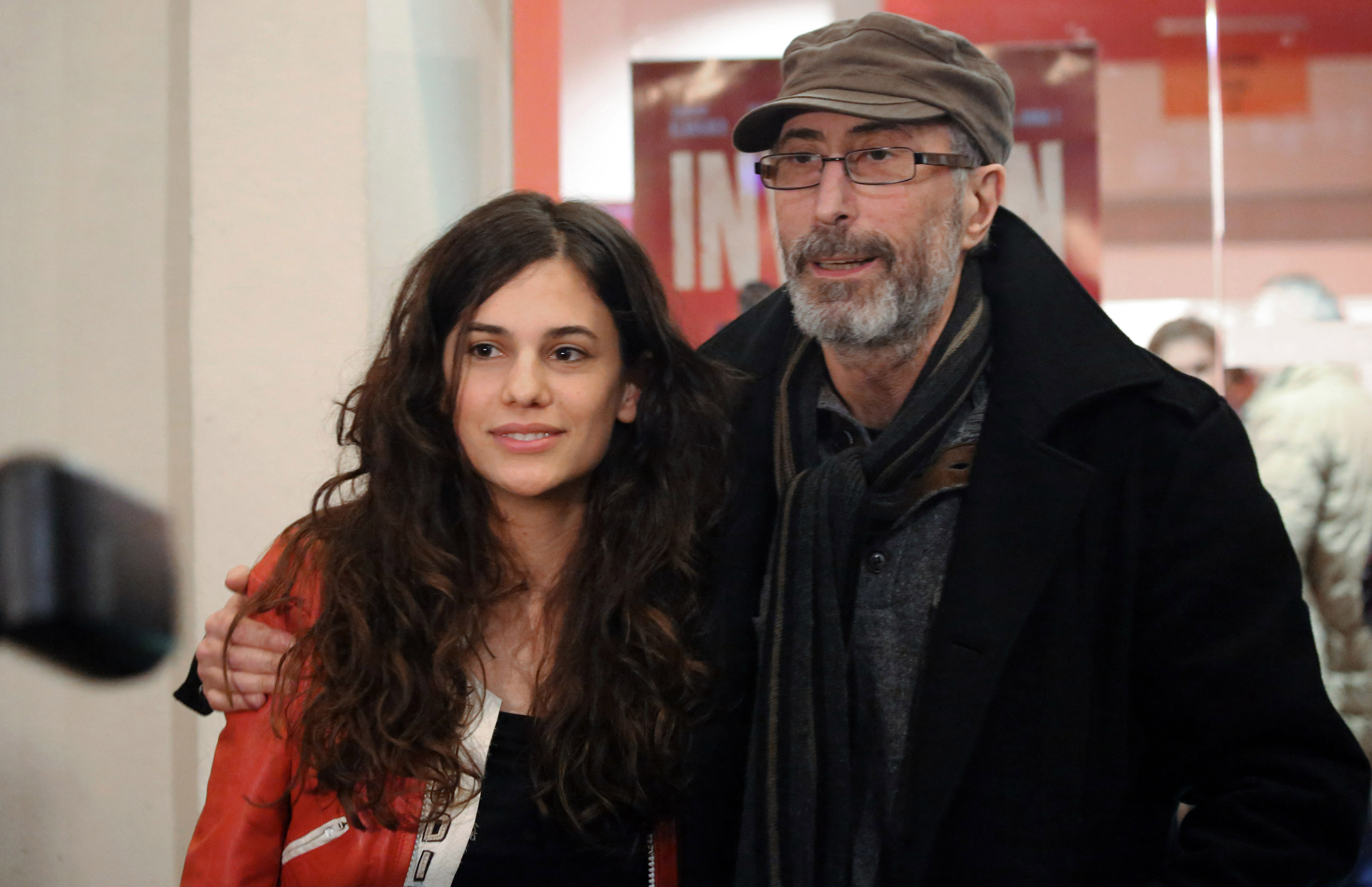
Dito Tsintsadze with singer Anna F. at the premiere of Invasion in Vienna, Austria in 2013

His film Invasion was released theatrically in German cinemas in 2012. The same year Invasion won the Special Grand Prix of the jury of the Montreal World Film Festival.

In 2015 Tsintsadze's film God of Happiness won the grand prize of Biberach Film Festival – the Golden Beaver. In the year 2016 he was a jury member of the Sofia International Film Festival. Tsintsadze´s latest movie Shindisi was screened at the 2019 Shanghai International Film Festival. It was selected as the Georgian entry for the Best International Feature Film at the 92nd Academy Awards. It won the Grand Prix at the 35th Warsaw International Film Festival in 2019, where Tsintsadze also won in the category of Best Director.

Tsintsadze is married to actress Marika Giorgobiani. They have one son, Nicolos Tsintsadze. From a previous marriage, he has one daughter, Nutsa Tsintsadze, and from a previous relationship, a daughter, Marika Antadze.

== Filmography ==
- The Drawn Circle (1988)
- Guests (1990)
- The Return (1990)
- House (1991)
- Zgvarze (1993)
- Lost Killers (2000)
- An Erotic Tale (2002)
- Gun-Shy (2003)
- The Man from the Embassy (2006)
- Reverse (TV film) (2006)
- Mediator (2008)
- Invasion (2012)
- God of Happiness (2015)
- Shindisi (2019)
