= Peter Kurth =

German actor

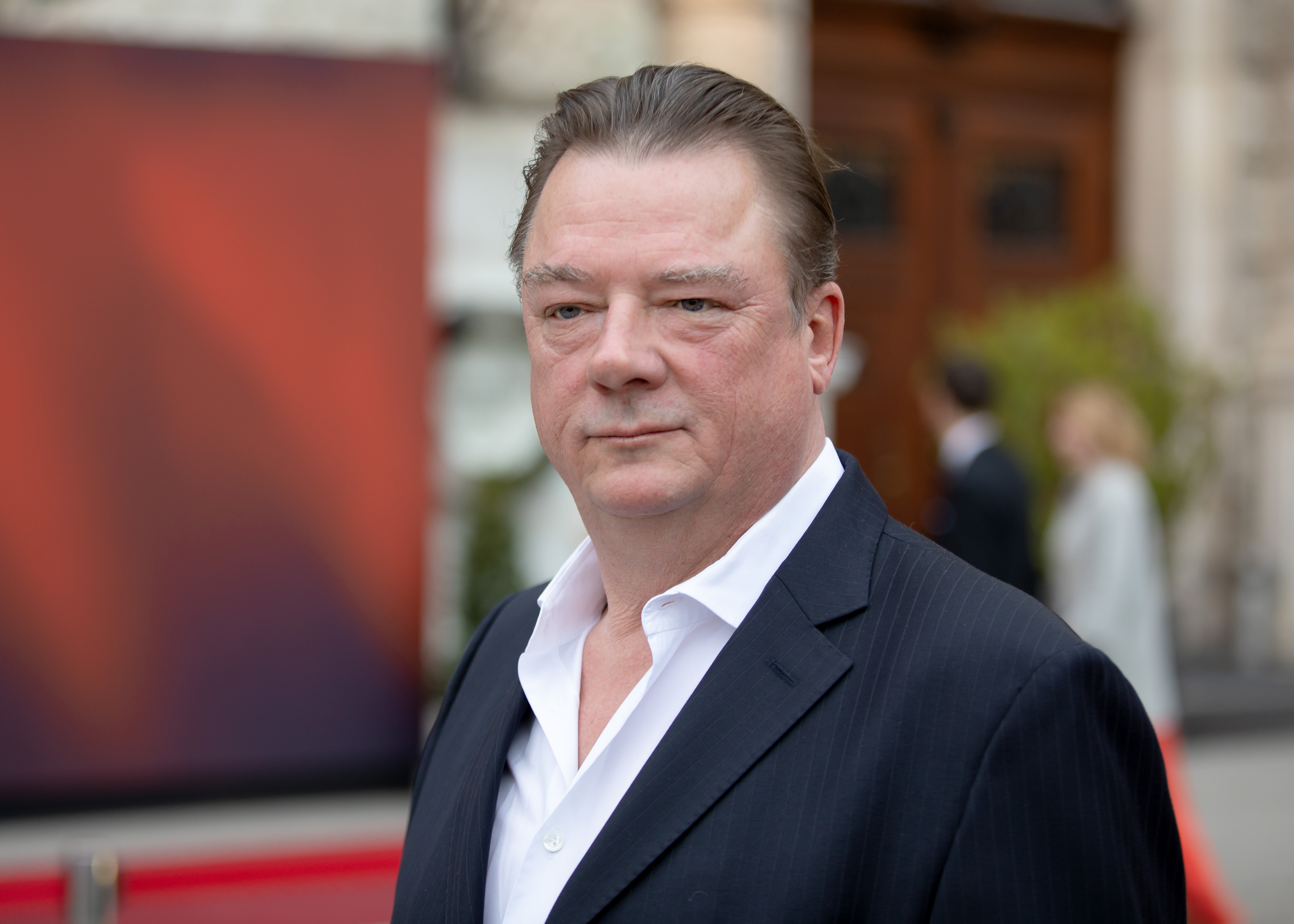
- Kurth in 2018
- Born: 4 April 1957 (age 69); Güstrow, Mecklenburg-Vorpommern, East Germany
- Occupation: Actor
- Years active: 1981–present

Peter Kurth (born 4 April 1957) is a German actor. He won the 2016 German Film Award for Best Actor for portraying a former boxer diagnosed with amyotrophic lateral sclerosis in the drama film A Heavy Heart.

== Early life ==
Kurth was born on 4 April 1957 in Güstrow, Mecklenburg-Vorpommern, East Germany. Growing up in Goldberg, he frequently visited the local movie theater, later citing it as an influence on his decision to become an actor. He attended the state drama school in Rostock from 1978 to 1981.

== Career ==
After graduating from drama school, Kurth performed at Theater für junge Leute in Magdeburg from 1981 to 1984 and at Theater der Altmark in Stendal from 1984 to 1988. He then moved to Karl-Marx-Stadt (Chemnitz), where he performed at Städtisches Theater. In 1997, Kurth joined the Schauspiel Leipzig in Leipzig, where he also taught drama. He moved to Hamburg in 2000 to perform at the Thalia Theater. He joined the Maxim Gorki Theater in Berlin in 2006, and later transferred to the Stuttgart Drama Theater.

Kurth was named Actor of the Year by the German theater magazine Theater heute in 2014. He won the German Film Award for Best Actor, as well as the Deutscher Schauspielpreis (German Actor Award), for the 2015 film A Heavy Heart in which he played Herbert, a boxer diagnosed with amyotrophic lateral sclerosis (ALS). Kurth prepared extensively for the role, gaining 35 pounds (16 kg) in the months before filming to physically resemble a former boxer, before losing his newly gained weight over the course of the 35-day shoot to portray Herbert's ALS progression. Scott Roxborough of The Hollywood Reporter called Kurth's portrayal of Herbert an "acting master class".

In 2018, Kurth was nominated for the Deutscher Fernsehpreis award for Best Actor, for his role as Detective Bruno Wolter in the German neo-noir television series Babylon Berlin.

== Personal life ==
Kurth is married and has two children.

== Selected filmography ==
Film performances
Year	Title	Role	Ref
2003	Good Bye, Lenin!	"X-TV" chef	
2003	Wolfsburg	Oliver	
2005	Ghosts	Foreman	
2006	A Friend of Mine	Fernandez	
2008	1 May: All Belongs to You	Harry	
2008	Without You I'm Nothing	Hans-Gert	
2009	Whisky with Vodka	Herbert	
2010	In the Shadows	Richard Bauer	
2013	Gold	Wilhelm Laser	
2014	Schmitke	Julius Schmitke	
2015	The Small and the Wicked	Hotte Mazocha	
2015	A Heavy Heart	Herbert	
2018	In the Aisles	Bruno	
2018	Sew the Winter to My Skin	General Helmut Botha	
2020	Christmas Crossfire	Rainer	
2021	Next Door	Bruno	
2022	Dark Satellites		
2025	Franz	Hermann Kafka	

Television performances
Year	Title	Role	Notes	Ref
2017	Babylon Berlin	Bruno Wolter		
2019	Criminal: Germany	Jochen Müller	Episode: "Jochen"	
2020	Altes Land	Hinni Lührs	2 episodes	
2021	Sörensen hat Angst	Jens Schäffler	Television film	
2022	Inventing Anna	Vadim Sorokin	Netflix miniseries	
