= Springfield Science Museum =

Science museum in Springfield, Massachusetts

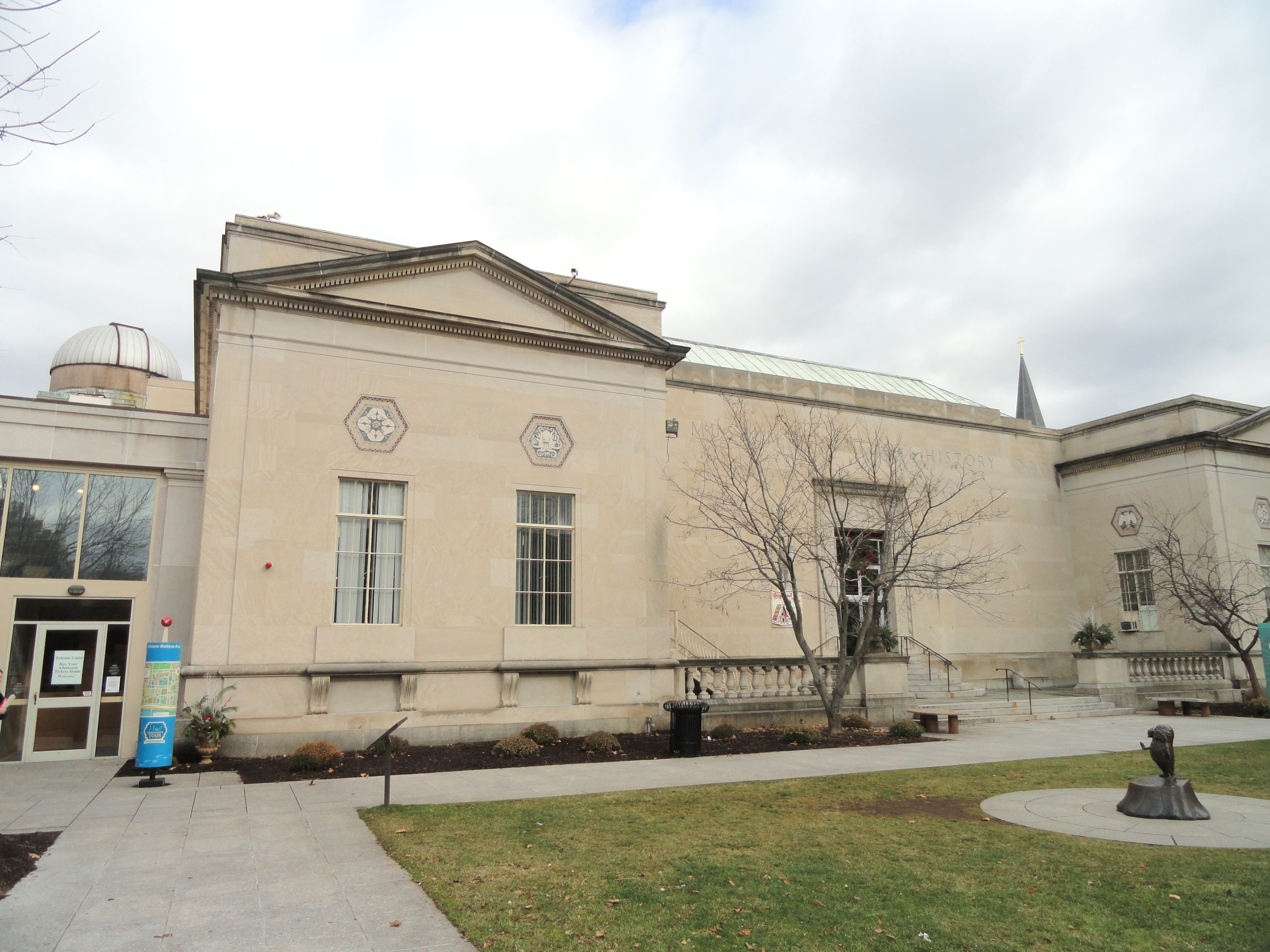
- Former name: Springfield Ethnological and Natural History Museum
- Established: December 1859
- Location: Springfield, Massachusetts, United States
- Coordinates: 42°06′16″N 72°35′09″W
- Type: Science museum
- Director: Jenny Powers
- President: Kay Simpson
- Website: springfieldmuseums.org

The Springfield Science Museum is located in Springfield, Massachusetts, in the United States. Founded in 1859, the museum has operated in its current building since 1899. The building has undergone two expansions, in 1934 and 1970. It is also home to the country's oldest operating projection planetarium, Seymour Planetarium.

== History ==
The Springfield Science Museum was founded in December 1859 at Springfield's City Hall, originally as a natural history museum and curiosities collection. It was moved to the City Library in 1871, when the library gained its own building separate from City Hall. Early exhibits included geological displays of rocks and minerals, and Revolutionary War relics. In the early 1890s the museum was moved once again, this time to the Art museum. The museum's collections began being moved to its own building in February 1899, and it opened as the Springfield Ethnological and Natural History Museum on October 16, 1899.

In 1928, the museum received Miss Oita, one of 58 Japanese friendship dolls, which has remained in the museum's collection up to the present day.

Exhibits present in the 1930s, which are still present in the current building, include the Native American Hall, with a diorama of two Native American men and one woman engaged in tool-making and cooking, and Habitat Hall, which features dioramas of taxidermied animals in their natural habitats. A Bird Hall also existed, with various local specimens and a case of extinct species (including the passenger pigeon, heath hen, and Carolina parakeet). Another since-removed area was the Hall of Ethnology, which showcased Native American baskets and tools, traditional Greenlandic clothing, musical instruments from around the world, and dolls from around the world.

Although not ready at the time of the museum's 1934 re-opening, the building did leave space for a planetarium, which would ultimately open in November 1937. The museum turned to Chicopee locals Frank and Stanley Korkosz to create the planetarium's "star ball", as they were unable to afford equipment from Zeiss.

In 1979 or 1980, the museum received a taxidermied polar bear, Snowball, who had lived at the Forest Park Zoo for 29 years.

In 1986, a Massachusetts man stole "Indian artifacts" from the museum, as well as from five other Massachusetts museums; the artifacts were recovered in February 1987.

Temporary exhibits hosted by the museum have covered a variety of topics, from natural gas (1993), to extinction (1998), to the history of bicycles (2002).

== Exhibits ==
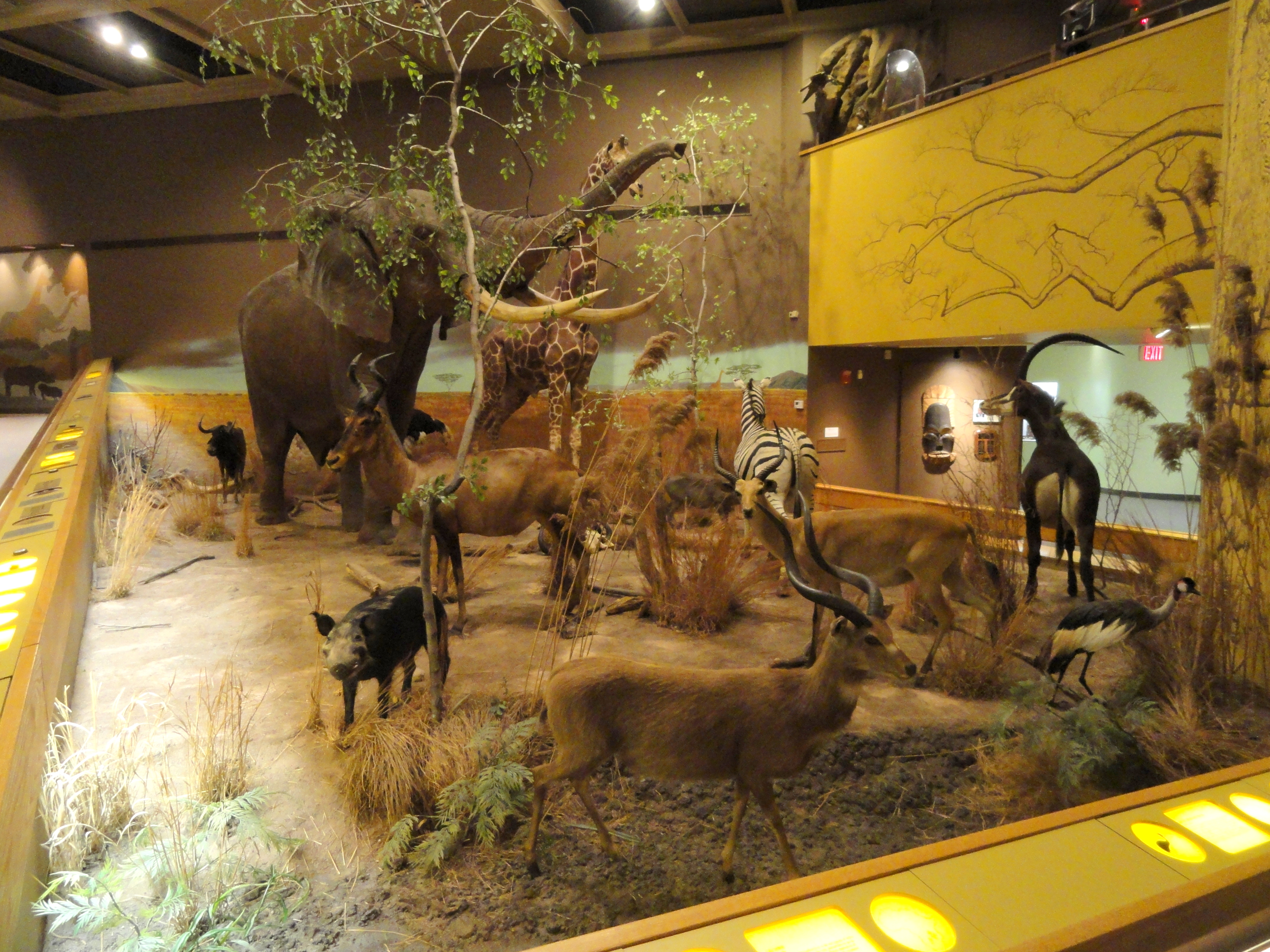
Part of the African Hall

The African Hall features multiple taxidermied Savanna species, including a chimpanzee who lived at the Forest Park Zoo until 1967, and a giraffe, acquired in 1985, that died at a park in Oklahoma.

The Dinosaur Hall includes a lifesize Tyrannosaurus rex model, which was installed in April 1975. The hall also includes a cast of Stegosaurus, and both a legbone of Alamosaurus and fragment of a tyrannosaurid believed to represent a new species, both collected in a 1920s Amherst College expedition led by Fred Brewster Loomis.

The museum's planetarium, Seymour Planetarium, which opened in November 1937, was one of a few of the era not built by Zeiss. It was remodeled and officially reopened in April 2023.

The museum has its own observatory with a 20-inch (51 cm) telescope that is periodically open to the public.

== Repatriation ==
In 1985, a Southington council member requested that the museum return the Luman Andrews collection, a collection of Native American objects collected by a Southington resident, to the Connecticut town from which he originated. The collection had originally been donated to the museum in 1921. The collection was loaned to Southington for a year and opened there in September 1985.

The museum announced their intentions to repatriate two Seneca masks in 1997, and Klamath jewelry and a Navajo pouch In 2002. The museum repatriated one set of human remains to Hawaii in 1997.

In 2013, the museum's curator found a mid-19th century Tlingit war helmet in the museum's collection, making it one of fewer than a hundred known examples. The helmet had been given to the museum sometime in 1899, but was miscatalogued as an "Aleution hat". The Central Council of Tlingit and Haida Indian Tribes of Alaska announced at the time they intended to request repatriation of the helmet.

According to NAGPRA, the museum had 148 Native American remains in the 1990s. A 2004 report from the museum reported that 84 remains were made available for return. 2007 marked the most recent year of repatriation, at which point 78% of all reported remains had been made available for return to tribes. In 2023, the museum reported having repatriated 25 additional remains, although these are not documented by NAGPRA. At one point, the museum had more than 600 objects associated with funerals; as of January 2023, 562 had been made available for return. As of October 2023, the museum self-reported having 31 human remains and 109 associated funerary objects.

== See also ==
- Quadrangle (Springfield, Massachusetts)
