= Invasion (2012 film) =

2012 film by Dito Tsintsadze

- Film poster
- Directed by: Dito Tsintsadze
- Written by: Dito Tsintsadze
- Produced by: Karl Baumgartner; Thanassis Karathanos; Vincent Lucassen; Ebba Sinzinger
- Starring: Burghart Klaußner; Heike Trinker; Anna F.; Merab Ninidze
- Cinematography: Ralf M. Mendle
- Music by: Gio Tsintsadze
- Release date: June 30, 2012 (Munich Film Festival)
- Running time: 102 minutes
- Countries: Germany, Austria
- Language: German

Invasion is a 2012 German-Austrian drama film directed by Dito Tsintsadze.

== Plot ==
The 59-year-old widower Josef has to cope with the death of his wife and son. After his son died in a bus accident, his wife had no more life courage and soon also died. During his visits to the cemetery, he meets Nina, who introduces herself as alleged cousin of his wife. She tells him that her son Simon and his wife Milena are looking for a place to live and that they can not find it, and gets Joseph to offer them a temporary home in his spacious villa on the outskirts of town. Soon after, the couple will follow Nina herself and her partner Konstantin and Milena's son Marco. They all spread out in the spacious property. First of all, Josef is happy about the visitors who care for him and bring him back a bit of life's courage. With time, however, there are more and more tensions between him and his new roommates and the originally ideal world begins to crumble.

In particular, Simon is a thorn in Joseph's eye with his questionable educational methods, which he shows when dealing with Milena's son Marco. Even Konstantin attracts Joseph's displeasure - he has settled in his office and operates a shady business, and invites alleged clients to the property to have grand celebrations.

In the course of the entanglements Simon and Nina come to their deaths. Konstantin, who is largely responsible for it, is killed by Josef in the forest at night when he is about to bury Nina's body. Then Josef returns to the villa in the early morning, where Milena, who has become his mistress, is already waiting for him. Josef has found a new family with Milena and her son Marco and in the hope of a carefree future, they will live together on his estate from now on.

== Cast ==
- Burghart Klaußner - Josef
- Heike Trinker - Nina
- Anna F. - Milena
- Merab Ninidze - Konstantin
- David Imper - Simon
- Jasper Barwasser - Marco
- Dmitry Brauer - Guest
- Waléra Kanischtscheff - Christian Fleischhauer
- Wilhelm J. von Reitzenstein - Ronald Fleischhauer

== Awards ==
The film won the Grand Prix of the Jury at the Montreal World Film Festival in 2012.
