= The King's Surrender =

- Film poster
- Directed by: Philipp Leinemann
- Starring: Ronald Zehrfeld; Mišel Matičević
- Release date: 28 June 2014 (FFM)
- Running time: 107 minutes
- Country: Germany
- Language: German

The King's Surrender (German: Wir waren Könige) is a 2014 German thriller film directed by Philipp Leinemann.

== Cast ==
- Ronald Zehrfeld - Kevin
- Mišel Matičević - Mendes
- Thomas Thieme - Harthmann
- Bernhard Schütz - Willmund
- Hendrik Duryn - Brandes
- Tilman Strauß - Thorsten
- Frederick Lau - Jacek
