= Gold (2013 film) =

2013 film

- Film poster
- Directed by: Thomas Arslan
- Written by: Thomas Arslan
- Produced by: Florian Koerner von Gustorf; Michael Weber
- Starring: Nina Hoss; Uwe Bohm
- Cinematography: Patrick Orth
- Edited by: Bettina Böhler
- Music by: Dylan Carlson
- Release dates: 9 February 2013 (Berlin); 28 February 2013 (Germany)
- Running time: 112 minutes
- Country: Germany
- Languages: German; English

Gold is a 2013 German Western film directed by Thomas Arslan. The film premiered in competition at the 63rd Berlin International Film Festival.

== Plot ==
The film depicts a trek of settlers of German and Austrian-Hungarian origin on their way through a sparsely populated part of Canada. The Group travels in 1899 from Ashcroft, British Columbia to Dawson City, following the Klondike Gold Rush.

== Cast ==
- Nina Hoss as Emily Meyer
- Uwe Bohm as Gustav Müller
- Kindall Charters as First Indian
- Rosa Enskat as Maria Dietz
- Peter Kurth as Wilhelm Laser
- Marko Mandić as Carl Böhmer
- Wolfgang Packhäuser as Otto Dietz
- Lars Rudolph as Joseph Rossmann

== Reception ==
Variety's Alissa Simon described the film as an "involving, naturalistic period piece" and an homage to "late-era Western". She also appreciated the cinematography for portraying the landscapes as "ruggedly majestic".

Cine Vue's Patrick Gamble praised Nina Hoss for being "her usual captivating self" who convinces the audience she lived through a variety of strong emotions "without even flinching a muscle" but he also stated her performance was squandered because the plot offered "little in the way of entertainment or palpable suspense".
