= Anna F. =

Austrian singer-songwriter and actress (born 1985)

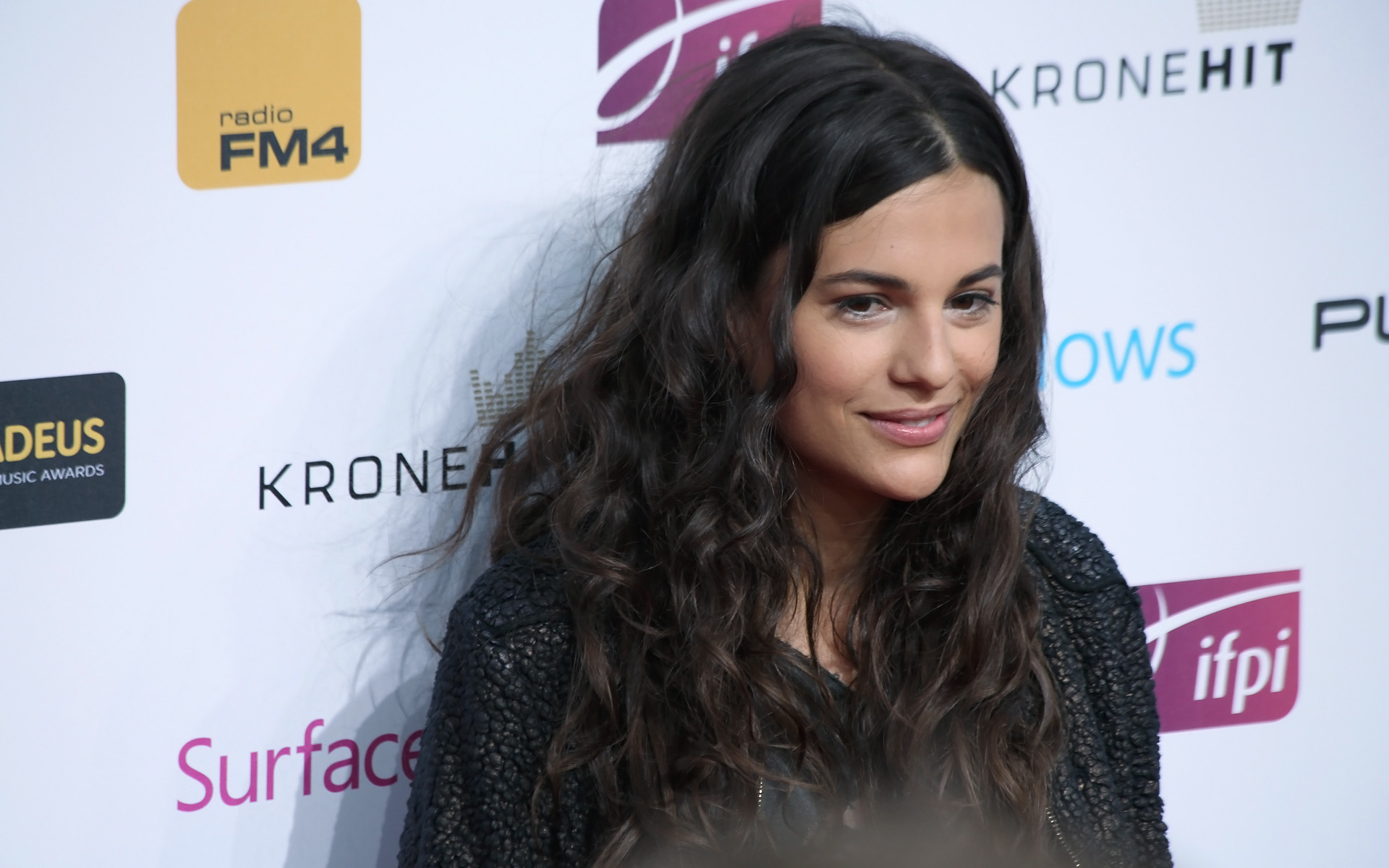
- Anna F. in 2014

Background information
- Born: Anna Wappel; 18 December 1985 (age 40); Friedberg, Austria
- Occupations: Singer; songwriter; actress
- Instrument: Vocals
- Years active: 2009–present
- Member of: Friedberg
- Website: www.friedbergmusic.com

Anna Wappel, (born 18 December 1985), known professionally as Anna F., is an Austrian singer-songwriter and actress. She is the frontwoman for the rock band Friedberg.

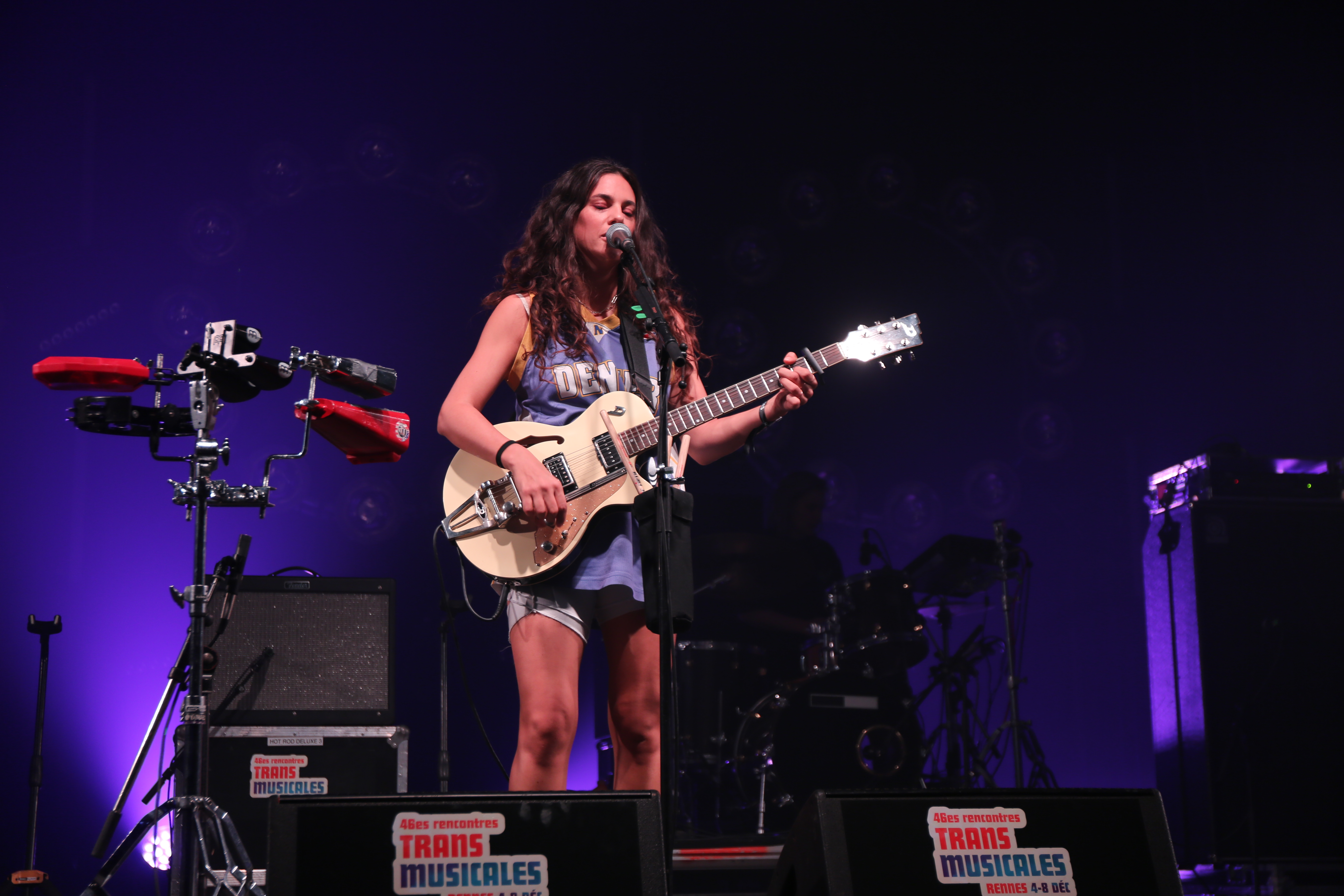
Anna F., with Friedberg band at Trans Musicales 2024

== Life and career ==
=== 1996–2008: Early life ===
Wappel was born in the Austrian town of Friedberg. She began singing in childhood, and cites the first records of her parents including Bob Dylan, Alanis Morissette and Joan Baez. She studied English and Italian philosophy and literature in Graz and worked for ATV on the weekends.

=== 2009–2011: Career beginnings, For Real ===
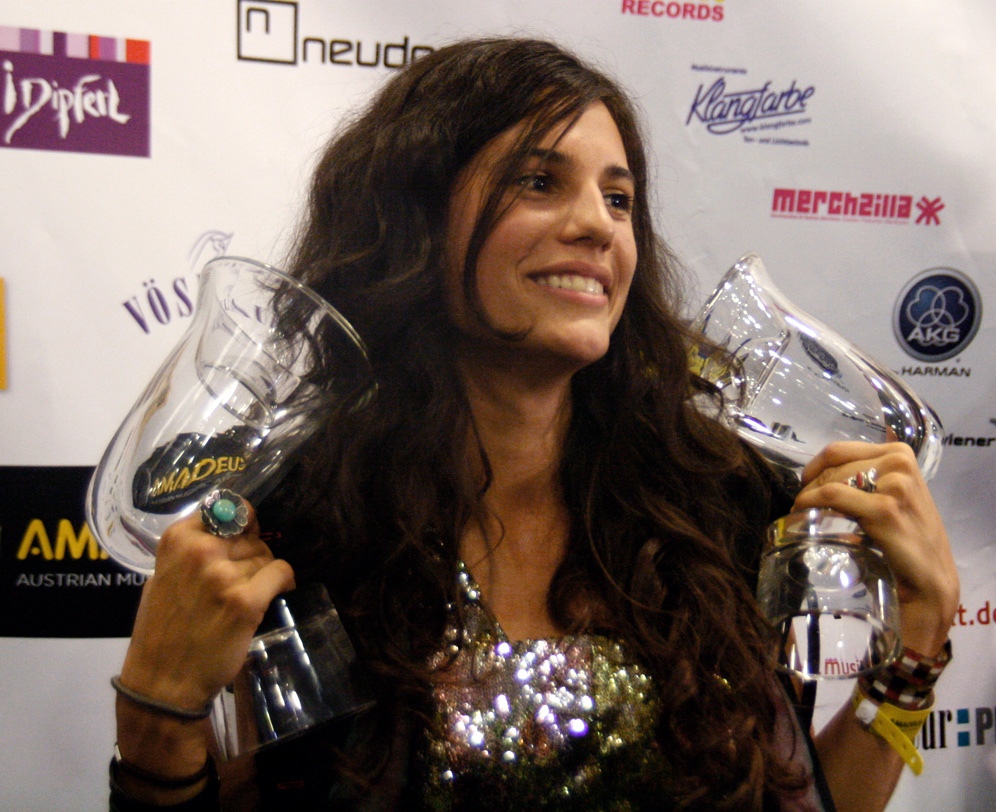
Anna F. at the Amadeus Austrian Music Awards 2010.

In the summer of 2009, Anna was an opening act for Lenny Kravitz's European tour. She won the "Pop" category at the Amadeus Austrian Music Awards 2009.

She published her debut album, For Real, on 5 February 2010. The album reached third place on the Austrian music charts and was awarded a golden certification. Wappel toured throughout Austria, including the Donauinselfest.

=== 2012–present: Acting debut, King in the Mirror, and DNA ===
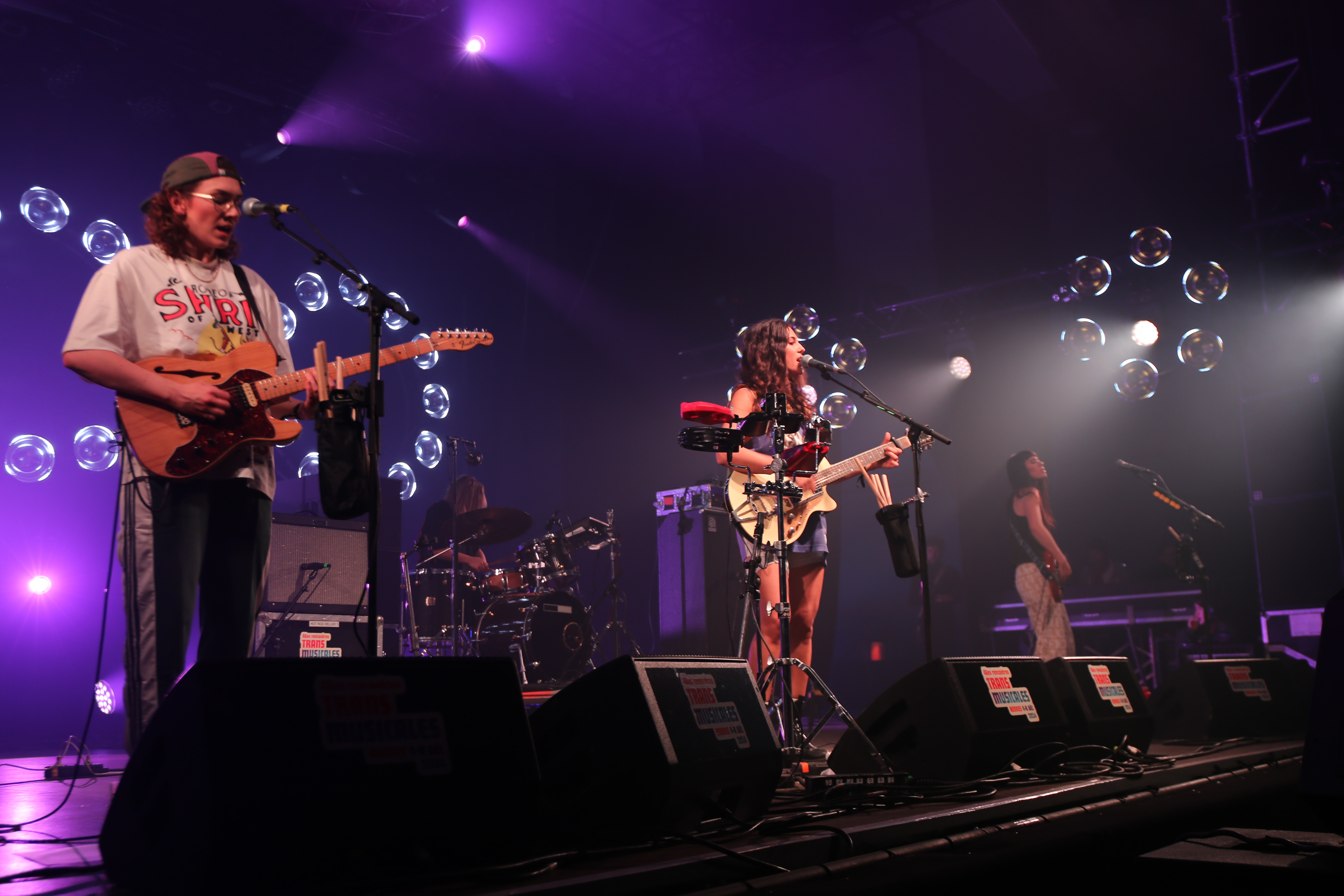
Friedberg band at Trans Musicales 2024

In 2012, Wappel made her acting debut in Dito Tsintsadze's feature film, Invasion which premiered on 30 June 2012 at the Filmfest München.

Wappel moved to Prenzlauer Berg in Berlin in 2012. She signed to Polydor/Island (Universal Music Group) in 2013. In August 2013, Anna released DNA as her first song from the upcoming album King in the Mirror. The music video was released on 3 August 2013. She performed on Jan Böhmermann's television show Lateline.

King in the Mirror was released in February 2014. Wappel was the opening act for James Blunt's tour in Austria, Germany, Italy and Switzerland.

In preparation for the Eurovision Song Contest 2015, Anna was a part of the ORF team which searched for potential candidates to represent Austria, acting as a coach to the musicians.

In 2017, Anna began recording a new album with producer Daniel Brandt, whom she was also dating at the time.

== Discography ==
=== Studio albums ===
Title	Details	Peak chart positions				Certifications
Title	Details	AUT	GER	ITA	SWI	Certifications
For Real	Released: 2010; Label: moerder music	3	—	—	—	IFPI AUT: Gold
King in the Mirror	Released: 2014	5	71	82	94	—
Hardcore Workout Queen	Released: November 2024		—	—	—	

=== Singles ===
Title	Year	Peak chart positions		Album	Certifications
Title	Year	AUT	ITA	Album	Certifications
"Time Stands Still"	2009	38	—	For Real	—
"Most of All"	2009	17	—	For Real	—
"DNA"	2013	15	19	King in the Mirror	FIMI ITA: Gold
"Too Far"	2013	16	—	King in the Mirror	—
"—" denotes a single that did not chart or was not released.

== Filmography ==
=== Film ===
Year	Title	Role
2012	Invasion	Milena (as Anna F.)
2017	Iceman	Kulan

== Awards and nominations ==
Year	Event	Category	Nominated work	Result
2009	Amadeus Austrian Music Award	Pop	—	Won
2010	Amadeus Austrian Music Award	Album of the Year	"For Real"	Won
2010	Amadeus Austrian Music Award	Pop/Rock	—	Won
2014	Amadeus Austrian Music Award	Song of the Year	"DNA"	Won
