= Shindisi =

2019 film

- Film poster
- Directed by: Dito Tsintsadze
- Starring: Dato Bakhtadze
- Music by: Zviad Mgebry
- Release date: June 2019 (Shanghai IFF)
- Running time: 105 minutes
- Country: Georgia
- Languages: Georgian; Russian

Shindisi (Georgian: შინდისი) is a 2019 Georgian drama film directed by Dito Tsintsadze. It was screened at the 2019 Shanghai International Film Festival. It was selected as the Georgian entry for the Best International Feature Film at the 92nd Academy Awards, but it was not nominated. It won the Grand Prix at the 35th Warsaw International Film Festival in 2019.

== Plot ==
Based on the true story of villagers from Shindisi engaged in saving wounded Georgian soldiers ambushed by Russian troops despite a ceasefire during the Russo-Georgian War.

== Cast ==
- Dato Bakhtadze
- Goga Pipinashvili

== See also ==
- List of submissions to the 92nd Academy Awards for Best International Feature Film
- List of Georgian submissions for the Academy Award for Best International Feature Film
