= Lost Killers =

2000 film

- Film poster
- Directed by: Dito Tsintsadze
- Written by: Dito Tsintsadze
- Produced by: Monika Kintner
- Starring: Lasha Bakradze; Mišel Matičević; Elie James Blezes; Nicole Seelig
- Cinematography: Benedict Neuenfels
- Edited by: Stephan Krumbiegel
- Music by: Dito Tsintsadze; Adrian Sherwood; Mirian; Little Axe
- Production companies: Home Run Pictures; Rommel Film
- Distributed by: Budapest Film; Mondo Films; Planet Media Home Entertainment
- Release date: 26 September 2000
- Running time: 100 minutes
- Country: Germany
- Language: German

Lost Killers is a 2000 German crime black comedy film directed by Dito Tsintsadze. It was screened in the Un Certain Regard section at the 2000 Cannes Film Festival. At the 10th Cottbus Film Festival the film won the top prize and at the 2000 Thessaloniki International Film Festival, Mišel Matičević won the award for Best Actor.

== Plot ==
The film is set in a red-light district of Mannheim, Germany and depicts five illegal immigrants on the fringes of society. Georgian Merab (Lasha Bakradze) and Croatian Branko (Mišel Matičević) have trouble finding employment and end up trying to work as paid contract killers. Their first assignment is to kill a Russian businessman (Viktor Benzler) but Merab does not have the stomach for murder. Branko also sells drugs in order to earn a living for himself and his dying mother Dusica (Dito Tsintsadze). Their lives become intertwined with three other outsiders. Carlos, a former martial artist (Elie James Blezes) from Haiti wants to sell one of his kidneys to get enough money to move to Australia. He also earns some money as a street musician. Lan (Nicole Seelig) from Vietnam who works as a cheap prostitute longs for expensive dental work which would fix her bad teeth. Her colleague Maria (Franca Kastein) who was abused as a child dreams of finding her soul-mate.

== Cast ==
- Lasha Bakradze - Merab
- Mišel Matičević - Branco
- Elie James Blezes - Carlos
- Nicole Seelig - Lan
- Franca Kastein - Maria (as Franca Kastein Ferreira Alves)
- Franz Koller - Franz
- Michael Holz - Flory
- Dito Tsintsadze - Dusica
- Athanasios Cosmadakis - Kostos (as Athanasios 'Saki' Cosmadakis)
- Viktor Benzler - Russian businessman
- Oliver Rischak - Drug dealer
- Jan Zagorski - Hotel porter
- Paul Haworth - Hippie in a car

== Reception ==
Review by Lisa Nesselson from Variety: "In "Lost Killers," an informal quintet of lovable losers pursue dubious schemes to improve their lives as illegal immigrants in Mannheim, Germany. Sly, off-kilter humor balances the essential tawdriness of prostitution, drug dealing and contract killing, resulting in a strikingly shot and surprisingly amusing slice of life. Georgian helmer Dito Tsintsadze's modest ode to joy in unlikely places is a nice bet for fests as well as a showcase for its multicultural cast."
