= Everett Barney =

American businessman and inventor (1835–1916)

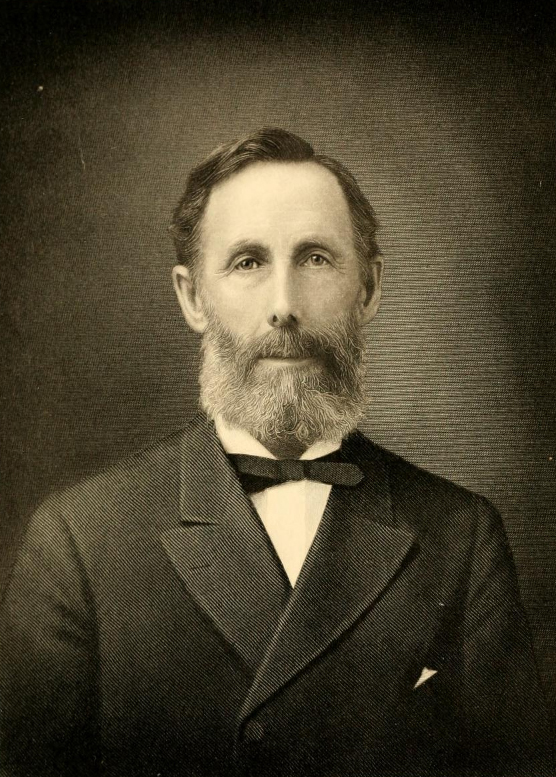
- Born: December 7, 1835; Framingham, Massachusetts, U.S.
- Died: April 1, 1916 (aged 80); Orlando, Florida, U.S.
- Resting place: Barney Mausoleum, Forest Park, Springfield, Massachusetts

Everett Hosmer Barney (December 7, 1835–April 1, 1916) was an American businessman and inventor from Massachusetts.

== Early and personal life ==
Barney was born in Framingham, Massachusetts to Harriet Hosmer Barney (d. 1847) and Jaries Sidney Barney (d. 1859), the third oldest of an eventual six siblings. His father worked as a manufacturer in Saxonville, producing machinery for woollen mills. Barney attended public school in Framingham.

Barney was one of the first consumers to buy a Knox Automobile in the early 1900s, and brought the first bicycle to Springfield, Massachusetts.

He personally enjoyed skating and canoeing, having taken up the sport in 1883. He won canoe meets at the Thousand Islands and Lake Champlain in 1886 and 1887, respectively. He was a charter member of both the Springfield Canoe Association (incorporated 1885) and the Springfield Boat Club (incorporated 1892) and, in 1903, became a life member of the American Canoe Association.

Although not attached to any one church, Barney was said to have Congregationalist affiliations.

From 1905 to 1910, Barney was involved in multiple regional organizations, including the Connecticut Navigational Association, the Connecticut River Improvement Association, the Connecticut Valley Historical Society, the Home Market Club, and the Republican Club.

His only child, George Murray Barney, was born on March 27, 1863. He had "business talent," and took up canoeing after his father became interested in the sport. He died unexpectedly at age 26 on May 29, 1889, from "lung fever". Following his son's death, Barney constructed a mausoleum on the estate, in which his son was interred, and in which he and his wife, Eliza Jane Knowles (1830–1905), were also eventually interred.

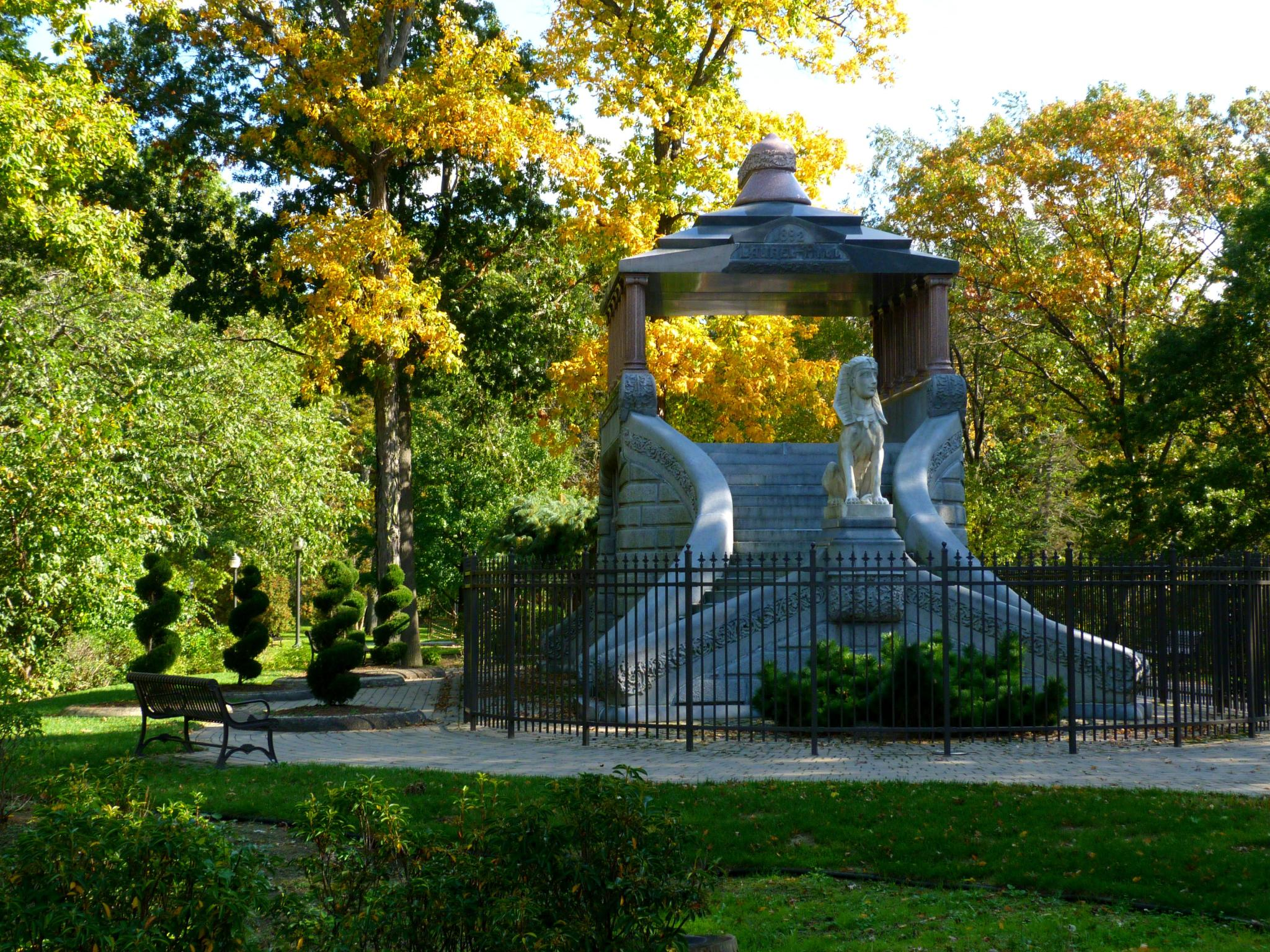
The Barney Mausoleum in Forest Park

Barney died at his winter home in Orlando, Florida in 1916. He also kept a winter home in Osprey, Manatee County, Florida.

== Career ==
In 1851, Barney was hired as a contractor at Hinkley & Drury's, a Boston-based company which made locomotives. He traveled for his work with the firm, visiting locales such as St. Louis, Missouri.

In the late 1850s, Barney moved to Connecticut, where he worked for a gun manufacturer, producing Spencer carbines. He later worked for the manufacturer in their New York branch, where he was put in danger during the draft riots. He then moved to Springfield, Massachusetts, to help another branch to help them finish a contract for the federal government.

In 1864, Barney patented clip-on ice skates, the first person to do so. He teamed up with a business partner, John Berry, whom he knew from work in Boston, to form the Barney and Berry Company, which began to produce the ice skates that same year by leasing machinery from a gun factory. The steel for the blades was produced in Windsor Locks, Connecticut, while the sheet steel for the tops was imported from England. The company built a factory at the mouth of the Mill River in the South End of Springfield, Massachusetts in 1866; during its time in operation, it was a primary provider of jobs for Springfield workers. In 1869, Barney bought Berry's share of the company, but retained the company's original name. In 1872, a factory was built on Broad Street.

In 1868 Barney invented and patented a perforation machine for banks. His other inventions included the breech-loading shotgun, which was an improvement of the carbine,, the saluting cannon for installation on boat decks, and a "life-saving sled" that could be used on ice and water.

== Forest Park estate ==
In 1882, Barney bought 110 acres of land in south Springfield near the Connecticut River. Beginning in 1884, he had water gardens created, and gardens planted with plants imported from around the world. He hosted public concerts and allowed people to visit the estate to be able to watch boat races occurring on the river. In 1883 or 1885, he built a mansion called Pecousic Villa on the estate.

In the 1890s, Barney donated his estate to the city to form part of the new public Forest Park, under the condition that he and his wife be allowed to live in his mansion until their deaths.

== Philanthropy ==
Barney funded the first public playground in Springfield, known as Fort Gallagher, which was located "along the river bank" on Wilcox Street. He also funded the construction of boathouses for a local high school.
