= Georg Friedrich (actor) =

Austrian actor (born 1966)

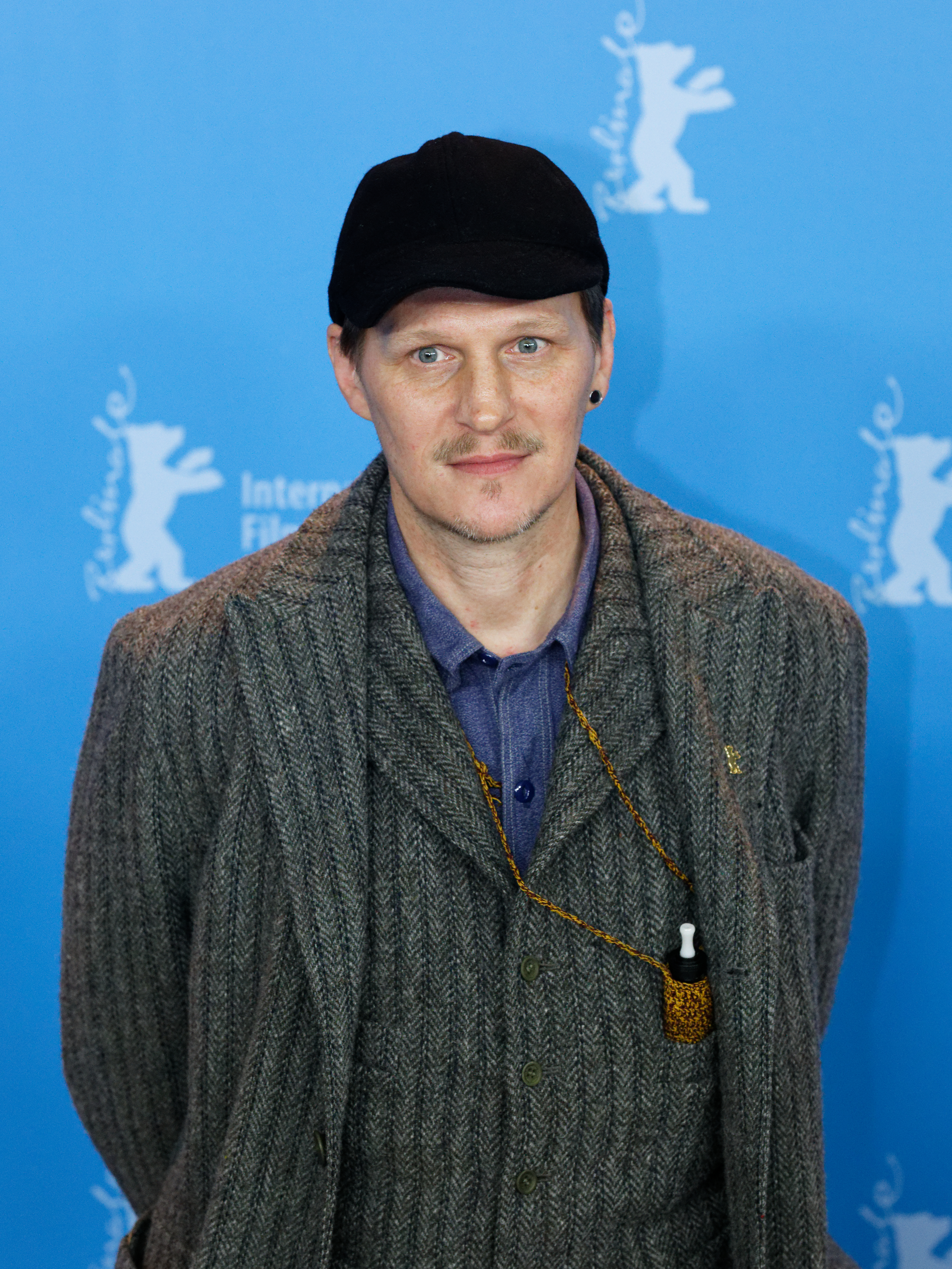
- Georg Friedrich at Berlin International Film Festival 2017
- Born: 31 October 1966 (age 59); Vienna, Austria
- Occupation: Actor
- Years active: 1984–present

Georg Friedrich (born 31 October 1966) is an Austrian actor. He appeared in more than eighty films since 1984. In 2017 he played in the German movie Wild by Nicolette Krebitz. He won the Silver Bear for Best Actor at the 2017 Berlin Film Festival for his performance in the film Bright Nights.

== Selected filmography ==
Year	Title	Role	Notes
2005	Fremde Haut		
2007	Import/Export		
2008	North Face		
2009	Contact High		
2009	Parkour	Janko	
2010	At Ellen's Age	Florian	
2011	Above Us Only Sky		
2011	Breathing		
2011	My Best Enemy		
2011	My Life in Orange		
2012	Lullaby Ride	Jorge	
2012	Annelie	Max	
2013	My Blind Heart		
2014	Superegos		
2014	Stereo		
2016	Wild		
2016	Aloys		
2016	Marija	Georg	Nominated for Best Actor – Riviera International Film Festival
2017	Bright Nights	Michael	
2017	Wild Mouse	Erich	
2020	Freud	Inspector Alfred Kiss	
2021	Great Freedom	Viktor Kohl	
2022	Rimini		
2022	Sparta		
2023	Caviar	Klaus	
2026	Objet a		
