= Bright Nights (film) =

2017 film

- Film poster
- Directed by: Thomas Arslan
- Written by: Thomas Arslan
- Produced by: Maria Ekerhovd
- Starring: Georg Friedrich
- Edited by: Reinaldo Pinto Almeida
- Music by: Ola Fløttum
- Release date: 13 February 2017 (Berlin)
- Running time: 86 minutes
- Country: Germany
- Language: German

Bright Nights (German: Helle Nächte) is a 2017 German drama film directed by Thomas Arslan. It was selected to compete for the Golden Bear in the main competition section of the 67th Berlin International Film Festival. At Berlin, Georg Friedrich won the Silver Bear for Best Actor award.

== Cast ==
- Georg Friedrich as Michael
- Tristan Göbel as Luis
- Marie Leuenberger as Leyla
- Hanna Karlberg as Cecilia
