= In the Shadows (2010 film) =

- Film poster
- German: Im Schatten
- Directed by: Thomas Arslan
- Starring: Mišel Matičević; Karoline Eichhorn
- Music by: Geir Jenssen
- Release dates: 15 February 2010 (Berlin); 7 October 2010 (Germany)
- Running time: 86 minutes
- Country: Germany
- Language: German

In the Shadows (German: Im Schatten) is a 2010 German crime film directed by Thomas Arslan. The film premiered at the 2010 Berlin International Film Festival, and released to German theatres on 7 October 2010.

== Plot ==
After being released from prison, Trojan seeks out his former accomplice Richard Bauer to claim his share of the heist they once carried out together, a crime Trojan never betrayed him over. Bauer fobs him off with a ridiculous €10,000, and even sends two hitmen after him. In need of money, Trojan contacts a planner to ask about work, and is offered a jewelry store robbery, but backs out when he meets the two designated partners, an alcoholic and a heroin addict. Through lawyer Dora Hillmann, he instead learns about the possibility of robbing a cash in transit van, and Martin Krüger, a casual acquaintance of hers who works for the company, can provide crucial inside information. Trojan visits his old friend Nico, and persuades him to join the job.

Meanwhile, police officer René Meyer, who is also involved in drug dealing on the side, hears from one of his dealers that Trojan is back in business. By surveilling Trojan and Dora Hillmann, he uncovers the plan. After the successful robbery, Meyer takes Martin Krüger's share and kills him, and when he later breaks into Dora Hillmann's apartment to seize her portion as well, Trojan shoots him dead.

Trojan and Dora Hillmann go their separate ways. Trojan dumps Meyer's body in a river, and hides out in his forest cabin. At the same time, the two hitmen sent by Richard Bauer torture and kill Nico. The next morning they sneak up to the cabin, but Trojan notices them and manages to kill them both. After disposing of the bodies, he returns to the cabin only to find the police waiting, forcing him to flee without his loot. At a gas station he steals a car, and drives off into the night.

== Soundtrack ==
Norwegian composer Geir Jenssen, known for scoring Erik Skjoldbaerg’s masterpiece Insomnia, created "a rhythmless soundtrack that tonally fits with the sound effects to create a disturbing atmosphere".

== Cast ==
- Mišel Matičević as Trojan
- Karoline Eichhorn as Dora Hillmann
- Uwe Bohm as Meyer
- Rainer Bock as Nico
- David Scheller as Martin Krüger
- Peter Kurth as Richard Bauer
- Hanns Zischler as Der Planer
- Jörg Malchow as Dragan
