= Forest Park (Springfield, Massachusetts) =

Park in Springfield, Massachusetts

Coordinates: 42°4′30.1″N 72°34′6.6″W

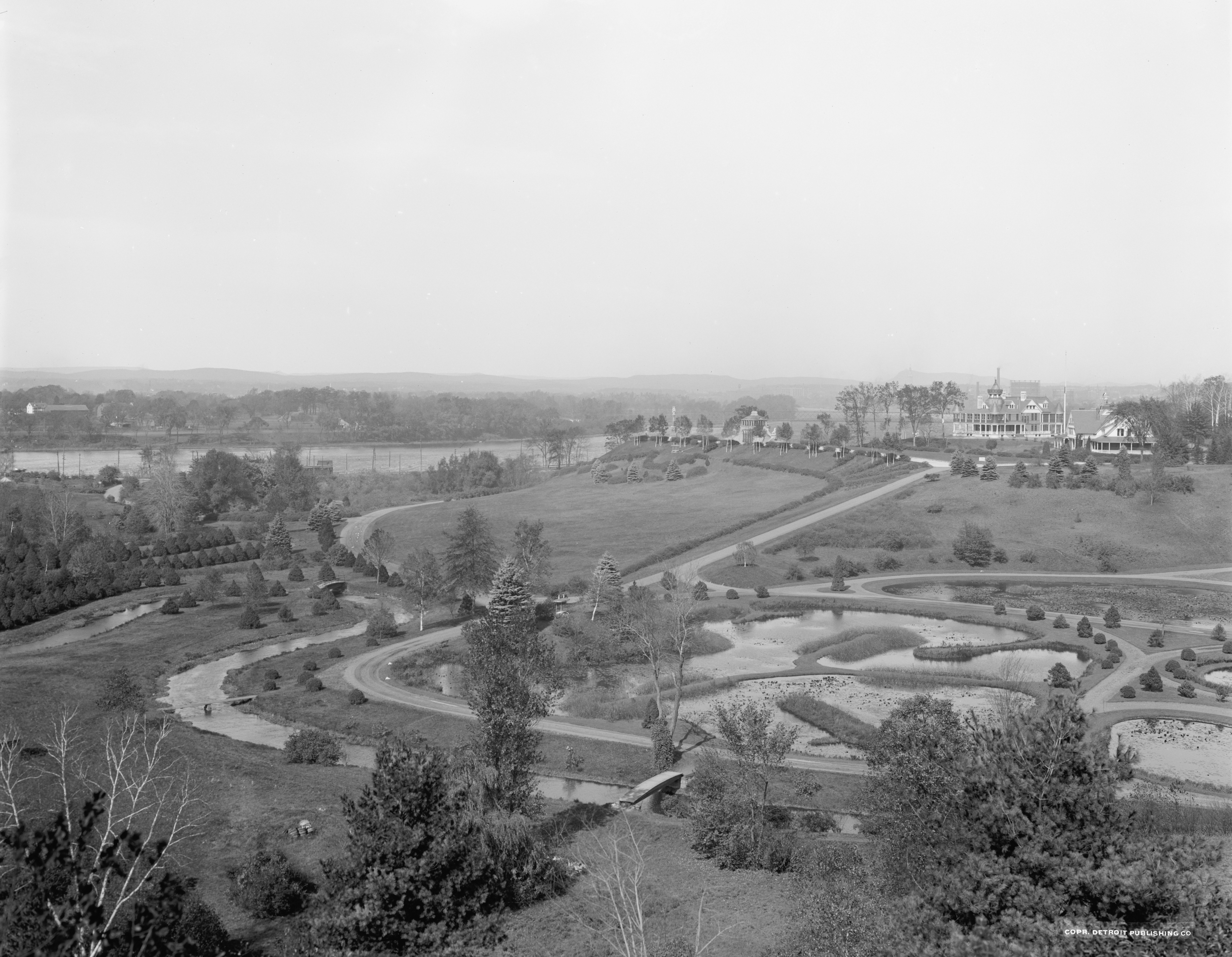
- Laurel Hill and Aquatic Gardens
- Interactive map of Forest Park
- Location: Springfield, Massachusetts, in Massachusetts, United States
- Area: 736 acres (2.98 km^{2})
- Created: 1884
- Operator: Springfield Parks Department

Forest Park in Springfield, Massachusetts, is one of the largest urban, municipal parks in the United States, covering 735 acres (297 ha) of land overlooking the Connecticut River. Forest Park features a zoo, aquatic gardens, and outdoor amphitheater, in addition to design elements like winding wooded trails, and surprising, expansive views. The site of America's first public, municipal swimming pool, currently, during the holiday months Forest Park hosts a popular high-tech lighting display, known as Bright Nights. Contrary to popular belief, the park was not designed by Frederick Law Olmsted, although it was designed by his firm.

== History ==
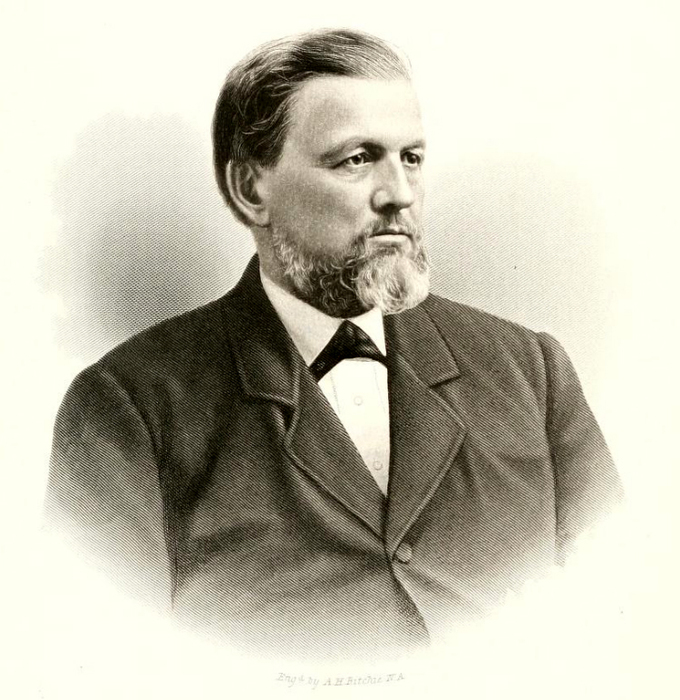
Orick Herman Greenleaf

In 1884, Springfielder Orick H. Greenleaf offered 65 acres (26 ha) for the establishment of a park to be named Forest Park. Shortly after, approximately 178 acres (72 ha) were donated by wealthy philanthropist Everett Hosmer Barney. Barney made his fortune as a Civil War arms producer and later as a businessman, inventing clamp-on ice skates and rollerskates.

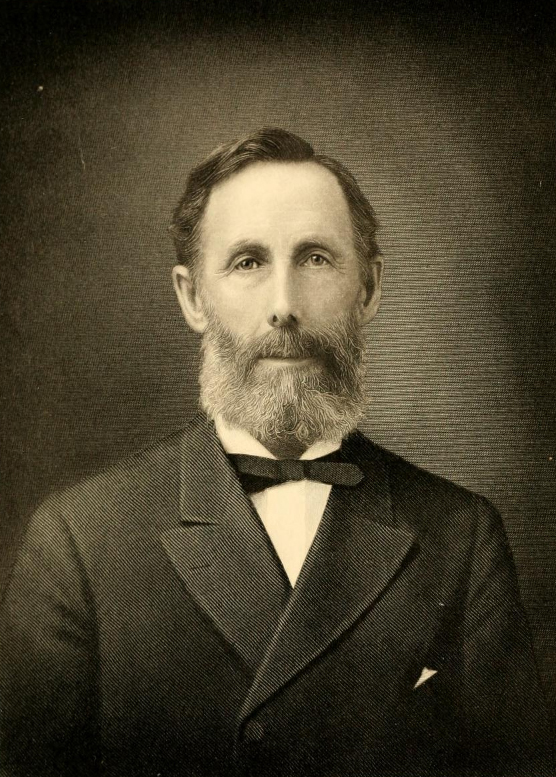
Everett Hosmer Barney

In 1890 Barney built an elaborate, turreted 2 1/2-story Victorian mansion on a hill at the west end of his estate, which featured a spectacular view of the Connecticut River and Metro Center Springfield. The mansion's elaborate carriage house still stands, today serving as a restaurant and banquet hall in Forest Park.

To create the parcel of land on which Forest Park was built, Greenleaf and Barney convinced several of their wealthy friends and neighbors to donate much of the remaining land that would ultimately make-up the 735-acre Forest Park. They both became members of the Board of Park Commissioners, which also listed John Olmsted (resigned on March 1, 1886). At the time, much of this land was located in the neighboring suburb of Longmeadow, Massachusetts, (which had separated from Springfield nearly a century before the construction of Forest Park). Ultimately, Longmeadow ceded complete control of Forest Park to the City of Springfield.

In October 2017, Massachusetts Governor Charlie Baker announced that the state would assume the $3 million costs to repair a culvert at the main entrance of the park.

On Aug. 27, 2024, Springfield Mayor Domenic Sarno and Parks Director Tom Ashe unveiled a new street sign for Chief Joe Luvera Way. Joseph Luvera (1930 - 2021) founded the Springfield Park Rangers in 1990, and served as its volunteer chief for over 25 years. He led a group of more than two dozen volunteer rangers. The newly named street is inside the Trafton Road entrance to the park. The mayor called Joe an "unsung hero" and "dedicated public servant."

== Interstate 91 ==
The Barney Mansion was used for Forest Park events until the mid-1950s, when about 50 acres (20 ha) of the park, including 15 acres (6.1 ha) of the former Barney estate, were taken to construct the Springfield/Longmeadow sections of Interstate 91. Barney's house stood atop the hill at the northwest corner of the park, and the highway construction may have threatened its foundations; anticipating that, it was razed. Ultimately, the construction of I-91 severed the Forest Park's connection to the Connecticut River.

The Barney Mansion's stained glass windows were moved to a house in Palmer, Massachusetts, where the demolition contractor lived at the time. The mausoleum of Barney's son and a carriage house still survive from the estate, along with many remnants of an extensive arboretum and water gardens planted by Barney around 1900. The developer of the Forest Park neighborhood continued this theme by planting many specimen trees, especially around Magnolia Terrace. This historic neighborhood with many fine examples of Victorian houses abuts the park on the north, while a small enclave of Springfield's stately brick colonial homes and the town of Longmeadow, Massachusetts borders the park to the south.

== Attractions ==
Among the Forest Park's notable year-round attractions are the Forest Park Zoo, which features large cats, monkeys, birds, and a number of other "exotic and indigenous animals"; several playgrounds; Porter Lake; an ice hockey and ice-skating rink, Cyr Arena; several baseball diamonds and a grandstand; a rose garden; a bocce court; a lawn bowling court; basketball and tennis courts; an aquatic garden (in the Asian style); numerous promenades; a beach volleyball court; several wooded groves; picnic areas; America's first public swimming pool (1899); ponds with various waterfowl; an exhibit of ancient dinosaur tracks, and an eternal flame that burns 24 hours a day honoring President John F. Kennedy.

The ruggedly contoured valley of Pecousic Brook occupies more than half of the south side of the Forest Park. This area has been left largely Naturalist in style, although it features many walking trails and a few bridges. This network of trails includes the Meadowbrook Ravine Trail, accessible near Barney Pond, and is a wide, well-traveled path with outlets to the Forest Park neighborhood of Springfield.

The park is also home to many species of birds and wildlife.

The statue at the Route 5 entrance to Forest Park was created by Peter Wolf Toth and is part of the Trail of the Whispering Giants. The statue represents Omiskanoagwiak.

A statue of a golden retriever, Stone Dog II, currently stands between the park's largest playground and the zoo. The statue is a near replica of an older statue (known by Springfield natives and park patrons as Stone Dog), which went missing from the park in 1987. The original Stone Dog dates back to the late 19th century.

Since 1970, the Environmental Center for Our Schools (or ECOS, as it is commonly called) takes all Springfield public school students in grades four through seven on a two-day environmental learning outing in Forest Park. The headquarters of this organization is located in Forest Park.

== Camp STAR ==
During Summer, Camp STAR/Angelina is an inclusive camp for children of all abilities, ages 3 to 22 years old. Some of the special needs populations the camp has worked with include: developmental delays, ADD/ADHD, emotional problems, learning disabilities, and visual and hearing impairments. Camp STAR/Angelina is a 6-week summer program. The camp is located on the outskirts of Forest Park off Trafton Road and activities include swimming, sports, games, crafts, field trips and an end of camp variety show.

== Bright Nights ==
Bright Nights at Forest Park is a national attraction from Thanksgiving through New Year's Day. It is a lighting spectacle that features time and color coordinated lighting exhibits. Trees and sculptures are decorated to look like various scenes and characters, including many from the works of Springfield native Dr. Seuss. Many scenes are animated; others are simply decorative. One of the spectacles' most elaborate exhibits is a replica of Everett Barney's mansion. Viewers in automobiles queue up to drive for approximately three miles along a meandering path through the park to see the displays.
