= Stone Dog =

Golden retriever statue in Springfield, Massachusetts

Coordinates: 42.07671°N 72.566585°W

Stone Dog II
- Artist: Getty Granite
- Year: 2013
- Medium: Granite
- Subject: Golden Retriever
- Dimensions: 76 cm × 61 cm × 120 cm (30 in × 24 in × 48 in); 2.5 ft × 4 ft × 2 ft
- Designation: Statue
- Location: The Zoo at Forest Park, Springfield, Massachusetts
- Owner: City of Springfield / Parks Department

Stone Dog II, located outside the Zoo at Forest Park (Springfield, MA). (photo by C. Welz)

Stone Dog II is a granite statue of a golden retriever posed standing guard in front of the Zoo at Forest Park in Springfield, Massachusetts. This 2013 statue, crafted by Getty Granite in Connecticut, replaced the original Stone Dog which went missing from the park in 1987, and continues a tradition with roots in the late 19th century. The present statue is almost identical to the original, measuring about 2.5 feet tall, 4 feet long, and 2 feet wide, and weighing approximately 1,000 pounds.

== History of the Stone Dog ==
The original Stone Dog had a long history in the city, dating back to 1888 or 1889, when it guarded a fountain at the triangle located at the intersection of Mill and Pine Streets between the city's South End, Six Corners, and Forest Park neighborhoods. Even then, neighborhood children were attracted to the dog, and used to play around the fountain and sit on the dog's back. In 1909, when the fountain was removed from the triangle, the dog was moved to Forest Park, near the original Forest Park Zoo. At some point, it was removed from that area, but was found in storage by park superintendent Theodor R. Geisel (father of Theodor S. Geisel, the popular author known as Dr. Seuss). Geisel had the dog placed at a playground near the Paddle Pond, where the swimming pools and hockey rink are now located. When the hockey rink was constructed in 1973, it was moved again, to a location near the Rose Garden, back by the old zoo. The dog continued to be well loved by visitors to the park, and was often photographed with children sitting on its back. In the summer of 1987, when construction began on the new zoo, the dog was moved to a park maintenance yard. While in storage, the dog disappeared.

== Investigation of the Stone Dog's Disappearance ==
Stone Dog poem from Peggy in the Park written by W.G. Ballantine in 1933. Illustration by A.B. Tufts.

The Stone Dog's absence was noted as early as November 1987, after which the Parks Department reported the theft to the Springfield Police Department, and a larceny investigation was opened. The detective assigned to the case exhausted all leads, and even offered amnesty from larceny charges if the statue were to be returned to the park. A reward was also offered for the return of the dog. Concerned citizens also investigated the loss of the dog. Students from Sumner Avenue Elementary School made picture books and posters appealing for the return of their friend, which they sent to then Mayor Richard Neal. Kevin Welz (a Springfield fire-fighter and lifelong Springfield resident), and Maggie Humbertson (then a city librarian, now the Head of Library and Archives at the Lyman and Merrie Wood Museum of Springfield History) researched the history of the dog, finding countless photographs, and also a poem about the dog in the children's book Peggy in the Park, written in 1933 by William G. Ballantine.

Ballantine was a biblical scholar at Springfield College. While the illustration in the book does not look exactly like the Stone Dog, the book includes references to many other sites in the park, including the zoo and monkey house, so it is reasonable to infer that the poem refers to Forest Park, and the Stone Dog.

Unfortunately, despite pleas for its return, the dog was never found. Welz, who had noticed that the dog was missing while visiting the park with his four-year-old daughter (who asked him “Where’s the doggy?”), was one of the first to inquire about the missing dog. Over the next quarter century, he often returned to the investigation, talking to other Springfield residents, following up with the Parks Department, researching the dog's history at the Springfield Library and Archives, and exploring the park and surrounding neighborhoods in search of the dog. Over the years, other Springfield residents have fondly recalled the Stone Dog, posting photographs and stories on social media, and inquiring as to its whereabouts through social media.

== Stone Dog II ==
In the summer of 2012, Welz decided that the park could not exist without its dog any longer. Collaborating with Parks Director Patrick Sullivan, Welz commissioned a new statue from Getty Granite in Connecticut. The new dog would be almost identical to the original. He submitted a number of pictures of the dog, to help with its recreation. The Parks Department was able to fund the project with money from the Edward and William Walker Trust and the Everett Barney Trust (reportedly including donations made after the disappearance of the original Stone Dog).

In September 2013, Stone Dog II was placed between the Zoo and the park's largest playground. Despite a suggestion to place the dog inside the zoo where it would be protected from theft or vandalism, Welz insisted that the Stone Dog belongs to all of Springfield's residents, and should be accessible to all park visitors. In the years since, a new generation of Springfield children have befriended the dog, and it is not uncommon to see them sitting on his back.
