= Sommerblut =

Sommerblut is a cultural festival in Cologne, Germany, which first took place in 2002 and offers a broad spectrum of performances, dance- and theatre productions, but also concerts, movies, art expositions and lectures. The program includes events from the fields of theater, dance, music, performances, exhibitions - including many in-house productions. Some events are especially suitable for people with walking disabilities, hearing disabilities or visual impairments.

== Awards ==
- 2007: Cologne Dance Award together with DIN A 13 Tanzkompanie for the performance "SEX ID".
- 2012: Cologne Innovation Award Disabled Policy for a theatre production covering dementia "ANDERLAND".
- 2018: Nomination for the Cologne Theatre Award for a production with drug addicts "DRUGLAND".
- 2019: Nomination for the Cologne Theatre Award for a production with young actors "YOUTOPIA".

== Past dates and artists ==
16 June – 5 July 2002

- Events: 13, i.a. Tim Fischer, Kommando Rothenberger, Janice Perry, Kordula Völker, Caspar & Bianca, Charles Ripley
- Visitors: 2.000

26 June – 11 July 2003

- Events: 16, i.a. Pe Werner, Maren Kroymann, the Pfister Siblings, dem Kommando Rothenberger, Malediva, Gayle Tufts, Rainer Bielfeldt
- Visitors: 5.000

9 June – 17 July 2004

- Events: 25, i.a. Antony and the Johnsons, Désirée Nick, Tim Fischer, Georgette Dee, Lilo Wanders, Ursula West, Kommando Rothenberger
- Visitors: 6.500

19 June – 10 July 2005

- Events: 28, i.a. Georgette Dee, Hermes Phettberg, Mirjam Müntefering, MännerKulturen, Barbara Kuster, Robert Kreis, Stefan Stoppok, Bettina Böttinger, Anka Zink, Isabel Varell, Coco Camelle
- Visitors: 8.000

18 May – 8 June 2006

- Events: 52, i.a. Tim Fischer, Georgette Dee, Katharina Thalbach, Christine Westermann, Gerburg Jahnke, Irmgard Knef, Konrad Beikircher, Gustav Peter Wöhler, Knacki Deuser, Beate Rademacher, Barbara Kuster, Rainer Bielfeldt, Christian Überschall
- Visitors: more than 10.000

16 May – 11 June 2007

- Events: 62, i.a. Georgette Dee, Dirk Bach, Désirée Nick, Herbert Feuerstein, Claude-Oliver Rudolph, Doris Kunstmann, Robert Kreis, Clueso, Jan Plewka, Anka Zink, Romy Haag, Hella von Sinnen, Rainer Bielfeldt, Lilo Wanders, Ulla Meinecke, Christine Westermann, Barbara Kuster, Ralph Morgenstern, Manes Meckenstock, Knacki Deuser, Mouron, Terry Truck, Telmo Pires

2008

- 120 events at 25 locations, 20.000 visitors

2009

- 150 events at 40 locations, 23.000 visitors

2010

- 150 events at 45 locations, 20.000 visitors.

2011

- 120 events at 35 locations, 18.000 visitors.

2012

- Topic: DEMENTIA (60 events at 25 locations, 12.000 visitors)

2013

- Topic: FLEEING (70 events at 40 locations, 11.000 visitors)

2014

- Topic: TABOO (80 events at 35 locations, 12.000 visitors)

2015

- Topic: MONEY (80 events at 30 locations, 11.000 visitors)

2016

- Topic: LOVE (80 events at 35 locations, 15.000 visitors)

2017

- Topic: INTOXICATION (38 events at 24 locations, 10.000 visitors)

2018

- Topic: BODY (31 events at 24 locations, 6.000 visitors)

2019

- Topic: FAITH (35 events at 25 locations, 13.500 visitors)
