= Austria in the Eurovision Song Contest 2002 =

- Eurovision Song Contest 2002
- Participating broadcaster: Österreichischer Rundfunk (ORF)
- Country: Austria
- Selection process: song.null.zwei
- Selection date: 1 March 2002

Competing entry
- Song: "Say a Word"
- Artist: Manuel Ortega
- Songwriters: Alexander Kahr; Robert Pfluger

Placement
- Final result: 18th, 26 points

Participation chronology

Austria was represented at the Eurovision Song Contest 2002 with the song "Say a Word", composed by Alexander Kahr, with lyrics by Robert Pfluger, and performed by Manuel Ortega. The Austrian participating broadcaster, Österreichischer Rundfunk (ORF), organised the national final song.null.zwei in order to select its entry for the contest.

ORF had returned to the Eurovision Song Contest after a one-year absence following its relegation from 2001 as one of the bottom six entrants in the 2000 contest. To select its entry for the 2002 contest, ten songs competed in a televised show where an internet jury panel and a public vote selected "Say a Word" performed by Manuel Ortega as the winner.

Austria competed in the Eurovision Song Contest which took place on 25 May 2002. Performing during the show in position 3, Austria placed eighteenth out of the 24 participating countries, scoring 26 points.

== Background ==
Prior to the 2002 contest, Österreichischer Rundfunk (ORF) has participated in the Eurovision Song Contest representing Austria thirty-eight times since its first entry in 1957. It has won the contest on one occasion: in 1966 with the song "Merci, Chérie" performed by Udo Jürgens. Its least successful result has been last place, which it has achieved on seven occasions, most recently in 1991. It has also received nul points on three occasions; in 1962, 1988, and 1991.

As part of its duties as participating broadcaster, ORF organises the selection of its entry in the Eurovision Song Contest and broadcasts the event in the country. The broadcaster confirmed its intentions to participate at the 2002 contest on 1 June 2001. From 1995 to 2000, ORF has held an internal selection to choose its entries at the contest. Along with its participation confirmation, the broadcaster also announced that its entry for the 2002 contest would be selected through a national final. This method had last been used by ORF in 1994.

== Before Eurovision ==
=== song.null.zwei ===
song.null.zwei (song.zero.two) was the national final that selected the Austrian entry for the Eurovision Song Contest 2002. The competition took place on 1 March 2002 at the ORF Center in Vienna, hosted by Andi Knoll and broadcast on ORF 1 as well as streamed online via ORF's official website. The first part of the national final was watched by 814,000 viewers in Austria with a market share of 31%, while the second part was watched by 913,000 viewers in Austria with a market share of 42%.

==== Format ====
Ten songs competed in the competition where the winner was selected by public voting and a jury panel consisting of 2,002 Internet users that were selected in late February 2002 via an online quiz organised by the radio channel Ö3. The jury results created an overall ranking from which points from 1 (lowest) to 5 (highest) were distributed to the top five entries. Viewers were able to vote via telephone or SMS, each of them which also created an overall ranking and assigned scores from 1 to 5. After the combination of all scores, the entry with the highest number of points was selected as the winner.

==== Competing entries ====
Six artists were nominated by record companies, while an additional four acts were chosen through an open submission. For the open submission, ORF invited all interested artists to submit their songs to the broadcaster between 28 August and 30 November 2001. The broadcaster received over 700 submissions at the close of the deadline, which were reviewed by a team of music professionals. The ten artists selected to compete in the national final were revealed on 28 January 2002 at an ORF press conference that was hosted by Andi Knoll.

Artist	Song	Songwriter(s)	Selection
Anik Kadinski	"Be Somebody, Be Someone"	Anik Kadinski, Florian Glaszer	Nominated by ORF
Bluatschink	"Bluama in da Scherba"	Toni Knittel	Nominated by ORF
Ela	"Love Can Change Your Heart"	Gernot Korak, Hubert Weninger	Open submission
Hartmann	"Supadupa"	Alfred Vau, Oliver Vettori	Open submission
Ilevenless7	"SMS4Love"	Christine Nachbauer	Nominated by ORF
Kubilay Baş	"Güle güle"	Kubilay Baş, Musit Dörtköse	Open submission
Loud9	"Won't Forget Tonight"	Ludwig Coss, Martin Böhm	Nominated by ORF
Manuel Ortega	"Say a Word"	Robert Pfluger, Alexander Kahr	Nominated by ORF
The Shepherds	"On a Day in June"	Gudrun Liemberger, Stefan Angerer	Open submission
Stermann & Grissemann	"Das schönste Ding der Welt"	Dir Stermann, Christoph Grissemann, Fritz Ostermayer	Nominated by ORF

==== Final ====
The televised final took place on 1 March 2002. Ten songs competed and the combination of votes from a jury panel and a public televote split between telephone and SMS voting selected "Say a Word" performed by Manuel Ortega as the winner.

Final – 1 March 2002
R/O	Artist	Song	Jury	Phone	SMS	Total	Place
1	The Shepherds	"On a Day in June"	0	0	0	0	8
2	Stermann & Grissemann	"Das schönste Ding der Welt"	0	4	5	9	2
3	Ela	"Love Can Change Your Heart"	3	0	0	3	6
4	Hartmann	"Supadupa"	0	0	0	0	8
5	Ilevenless7	"SMS4Love"	0	1	0	1	7
6	Bluatschink	"Bluama in da Scherba"	4	2	2	8	3
7	Manuel Ortega	"Say a Word"	1	5	4	10	1
8	Loud9	"Won't Forget Tonight"	2	3	3	8	3
9	Kubilay Baş	"Güle güle"	0	0	0	0	8
10	Anik Kadinski	"Be Somebody, Be Someone"	5	0	1	6	5

== At Eurovision ==
According to Eurovision rules, all nations with the exceptions of the bottom six countries in the 2001 contest competed in the final. On 9 November 2001, a special allocation draw was held which determined the running order and Austria was set to perform in position 3, following the entry from the United Kingdom and before the entry from Greece. Austria finished in eighteenth place with 26 points.

The show was broadcast in Austria on ORF eins with commentary by Andi Knoll and via radio on FM4 with commentary by Stermann & Grissemann.

=== Voting ===
Below is a breakdown of points awarded to Austria and awarded by Austria in the contest. The nation awarded its 12 points to the United Kingdom in the contest. ORF appointed Dodo Roscic as its spokesperson to announce the Austrian votes during the final.

Points awarded to Austria
Score	Country
12 points	Turkey
10 points	
8 points	
7 points	Switzerland
6 points	
5 points	Belgium
4 points	
3 points	
2 points	
1 point	Cyprus; Russia

Points awarded by Austria
Score	Country
12 points	United Kingdom
10 points	Latvia
8 points	Malta
7 points	Bosnia and Herzegovina
6 points	Croatia
5 points	Switzerland
4 points	Sweden
3 points	Estonia
2 points	Slovenia
1 point	Germany
