= Wicked Game (disambiguation) =

"Wicked Game" is a 1990 song by Chris Isaak.

Wicked Game may also refer to:

- Wicked Game (Chris Isaak album), 1991 album by Chris Isaak
- Wicked Game (Il Divo album), sixth studio album by the operatic pop group, Il Divo
- Wicked Game (film), 1989 Egyptian film

== See also ==
- "Wicked Games", 2011 song by the Weeknd
- Wicked Games, a diptych comprising the films Rimini and Sparta directed by Ulrich Seidl
