= The Candy Kid =

The Candy Kid may refer to:

- The Candy Kid (1917 film)
- The Candy Kid (1928 film)
