= Carpet cleaner =

Carpet cleaner or rug cleaner may refer to:

- a product used in carpet cleaning
- Carpet beater
- Carpet sweeper
