= Belgian Quarter (Cologne) =

Neighborhood in Cologne, Germany

Coordinates: 50°56′18″N 6°56′5″E

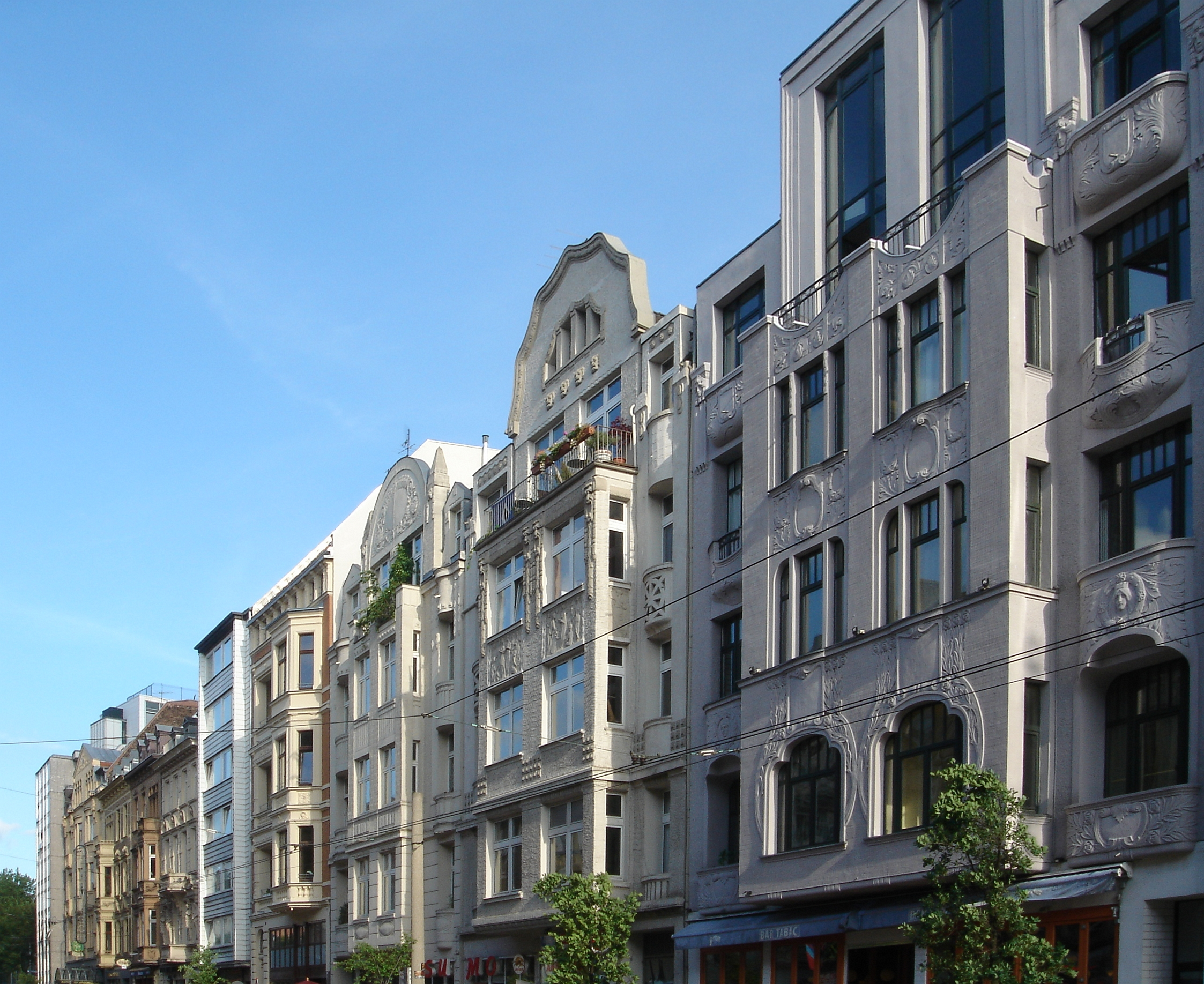
Aachener Straße

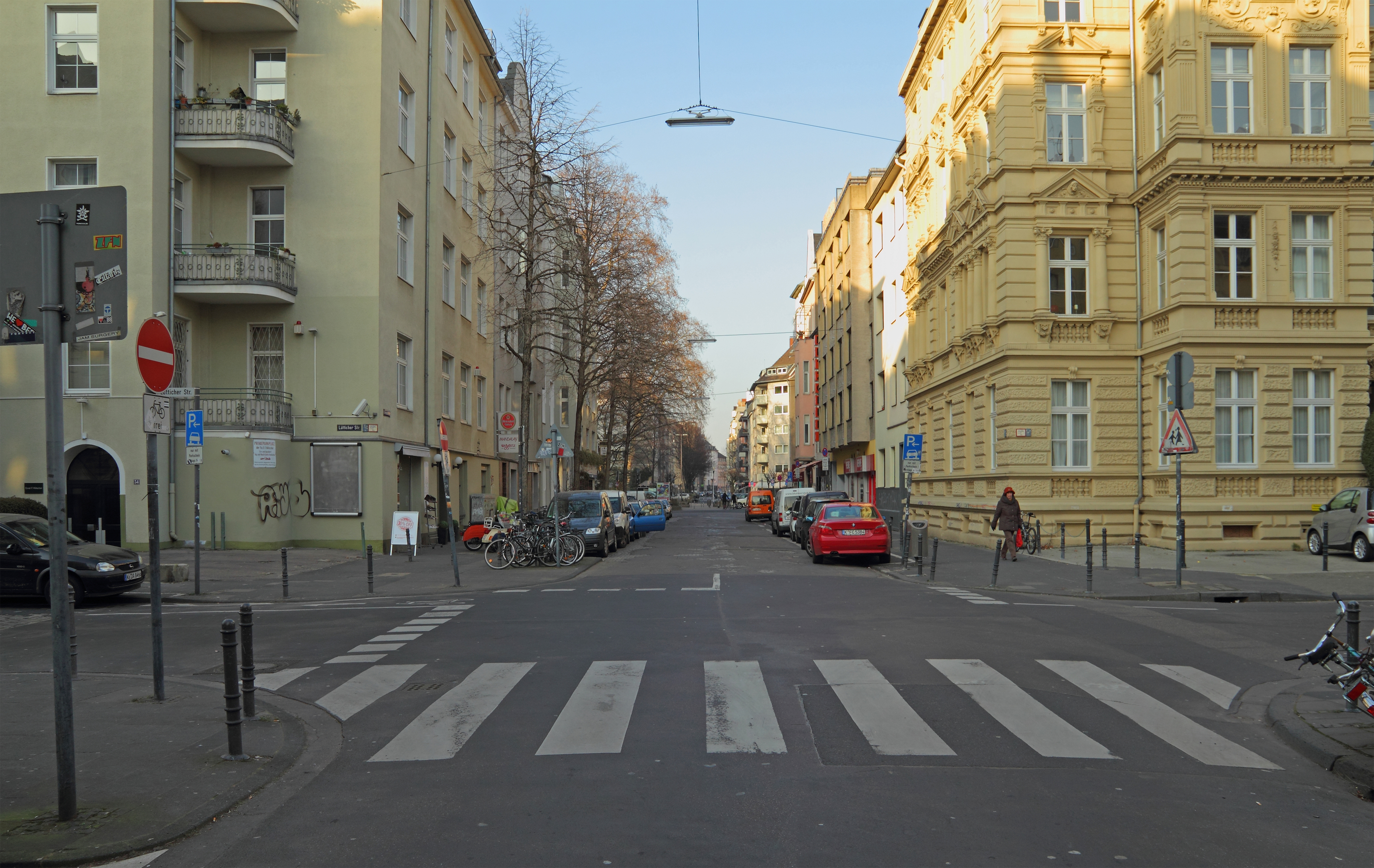
Brüsseler Straße

The Belgian Quarter (German: Belgisches Viertel, Standard German: [ˈbɛlɡɪʃəs ˈfɪʁtl̩], Colognian: [ˈbɛ̂ljeʃə ˈfêdəl]) is an inner city district of Cologne, Germany. The name is derived from street names in the vicinity, referring to Belgian provinces or cities.

In the northern part of the Quarter, street names such as Goebenstraße, Werderstraße, Moltkestraße and Spichernstraße celebrate the leaders and victories of Prussia in the Franco-Prussian War of 1870–1871 which brought down the Second French Empire and led to the creation of a new German Empire.

At the heart of the Belgian Quarter is the Brüsseler Platz, or Brussels Square, dominated by the neo-Romanesque St Michael's Church, built between 1902 and 1906. On warm summer evenings, the square becomes a popular gathering place for young people.

With a wide variety of cuisine, this Veedel (the local language term for quarter) of Cologne is now considered fashionable, and in the July 2010 issue of the lifestyle magazine Prinz it was named as the part of the city most worth living in. The publication's web site continues to praise it as an "upmarket residential district and meeting place for the creative arts". The TV show NightWash was set in a laundrette in the district for years.

== History ==
=== Middle Ages ===
The present-day Brüsseler Straße and Moltkestraße once formed part of the medieval Bischofsweg. The shorter northern section of Brüsseler Straße, between Antwerpener Straße and Venloer Straße, follows the route of the old medieval Bischofsweg, while the central section, between Aachener Straße and Antwerpener Straße, follows the later Neuer Bischofsweg ("New Bischofsweg"). The southern section of Moltkestraße, between Jülicher Straße and Aachener Straße, follows the route of the Neuer Bischofsweg. Horticulture predominated in the area between the medieval city wall and the Bischofsweg, while arable farming and livestock raising were more common in the outer jurisdictional district (Burgbann). Horticulture consisted primarily of vegetable cultivation and viticulture on small plots enclosed by fences or walls.

=== 19th century ===
During the period of French rule, the Bischofsweg became the boundary between the cantons of Weiden and Cologne on 5 February 1799.

City architect Josef Stübben presented plans for the expansion of Cologne on 14 October 1881. He was commissioned to oversee the large-scale demolition of the medieval fortifications and their twelve gates and the construction of the Cologne Ring boulevard in their place. The first breach in the city wall was made at Gereonswall on 18 June 1881. Its subsequent demolition enabled the rapidly growing city to expand into the land outside the former fortifications, an area corresponding to the present-day Neustadt.

The Cologne architect Carl August Philipp had already submitted a development plan for the former fortress grounds in 1879. Construction in the Belgian Quarter began shortly after demolition of the city wall commenced on 18 June 1881.

On 6 March 1884, the city council considered the naming of streets in the new quarter and selected Lütticher Straße, Maastrichter Straße, Antwerpener Straße, Genter Straße and Brüsseler Straße. The decision noted that, together with the already existing Limburger Straße and Flandrische Straße, the intention was to "bring together all of Holland and Belgium" in the quarter. Municipal building-line plans determined the routes of the new streets. Plans nos. 13 and 27, adopted by the city council on 25 May 1882 and 30 October 1884 respectively, defined the course of Lütticher Straße between Flandrische Straße and Moltkestraße.

In May 1889, the Archdiocese of Cologne acquired a site on Brüsseler Platz for St Michael's Church. The church was consecrated on 29 September 1894, and the present building was constructed between 1902 and 1906. Brüsseler Platz was laid out partly on the site of Lunette 5, a former lunette of the city's fortifications. The square was named after the existing Brüsseler Straße, continuing the Belgian and Dutch naming scheme used for streets in the quarter.

Around the turn of the 20th century, representative residential buildings in the Jugendstil style were erected in the streets surrounding the square. Some featured marble staircases decorated with mirrors. Examples included Brüsseler Platz 14 (c. 1898; demolished in 1974) and nos. 11–21 (c. 1898), as well as the earlier buildings at Brüsseler Straße 1–5 (1893) and the later building at no. 92 (1904). Blind-tracery balustrades were used, among other places, at Brüsseler Platz 17 and Brüsseler Straße 33. The residential buildings on Lütticher Straße, with the exception of those in its eastern section, had front gardens. The house at Lütticher Straße 34, built in 1903 in the Historicism style, has been a listed monument since 2 August 1983, as have many other buildings in the quarter. Further examples included Antwerpener Straße 3 (c. 1886), Genter Straße 23 (1905) and Antwerpener Straße 24–40 (1900–1905).

The buildings at Flandrische Straße 12–20 and Lütticher Straße 1–5, completed by Carl August Philipp in 1885, were a characteristic example of a coordinated group development comprising several houses; only Lütticher Straße 5 survives today. The construction of Utrechter Straße, approximately following the route of the old Melatener Weg beyond Moltkestraße as far as the railway embankment, was not approved by the city council until 14 February 1889. Most of the streets in this area were laid out only after 1890. Maastrichter Straße originally extended continuously as far as the Maastrichter Tor; in 1903, the section between Brüsseler Platz and the Maastrichter Tor was renamed Neue Maastrichter Straße.

=== 20th century ===
During Nazi rule, the Kreisverwaltung Köln-Land, the district administration for the rural district surrounding Cologne, was based at Lütticher Straße 19 from 25 May until 4 November 1933. The street names of the Belgian Quarter were consistent with the street-naming principles introduced by the Nazi authorities in 1939, which stated that grouping streets into quarters by assigning names belonging to a particular category was useful because it made orientation considerably easier for visitors unfamiliar with the area.

During World War II, an air raid on 28 September 1944 damaged numerous patrician houses in the quarter, and St Michael's Church was also hit. Numerous historic townhouses in the neighbourhood survived the bombing and subsequently became among the most sought-after residential properties in Cologne.
