= Gloria-Theater (Cologne) =

Theatre and event space in Cologne, Germany

Coordinates: 50°56′15″N 6°56′42″E

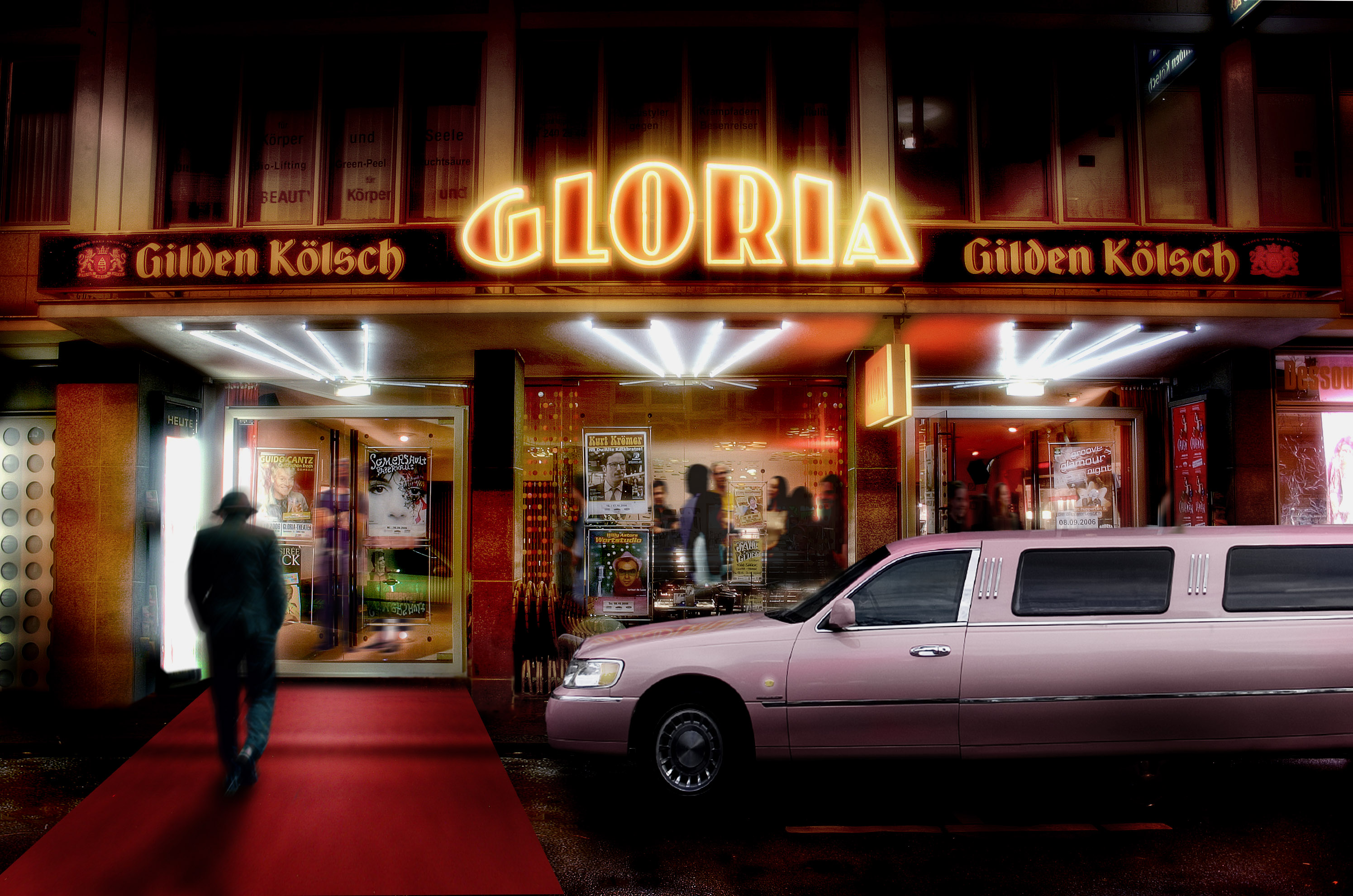
Entrance to the Gloria-Theater

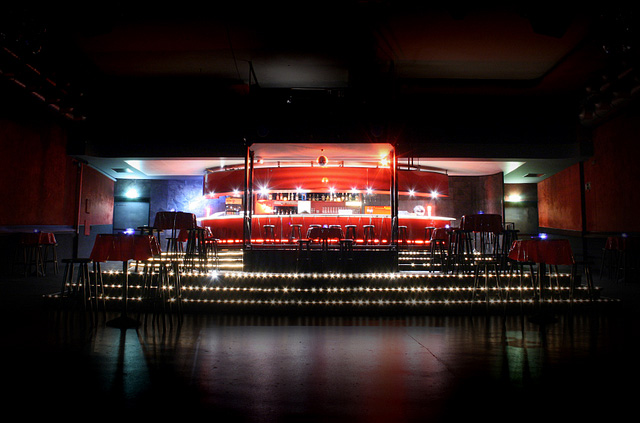
Bar area

The Gloria-Theater is a multi-purpose theatre and event space, originally a cinema-theatre, in the centre of Cologne, North Rhine-Westphalia, Germany. It is located on Apostelnstraße north of the Neumarkt, near the Basilica of the Holy Apostles.

== History ==
The Gloria opened on 30 November 1956 as a cinema-theatre with the Austrian film Engagement at Wolfgangsee, directed by Helmut Weiss, and the play Till Eulenspiegel with Gérard Philipe. In the 1970s it showed pornographic films, such as those featuring Ingrid Steeger.

In 1991 the building ceased to be a cinema and became an event location, specialising in hosting gay and lesbian parties. Hella von Sinnen celebrated a première there in 1995, Hermann Götting threw popular birthday parties, and The Kelly Family played an AIDS benefit there. In 1994, the opening scene of the film Der bewegte Mann with Til Schweiger was shot inside, and in 2001 Walter Bockmayer set Wer Liebe sucht there.

After a complete renovation and the addition of up-to-date technical equipment, the Gloria has since 2000 been a multi-purpose theatre and event location. It contains a theatre space with a maximum capacity of 400 sitting or 950 standing, and an 80-seat café. The ambience evokes the 1950s, and the showcases with neon script at the entrance, the ticket kiosk, and the red velvet décor in the auditorium still recall its past as a cinema. The operator is Gastro-Event GmbH, which employs approximately 50 people there. The Gloria is used for concerts, parties, readings, theatrical and comedy performances including the Cologne Comedy Festival, and sometimes for TV shows, including NightWash. It has been described as "at the nexus of Cologne's trendy gay and lesbian scene".
