= Manuel Ortega (singer) =

Austrian singer of Spanish origin (born 1980)

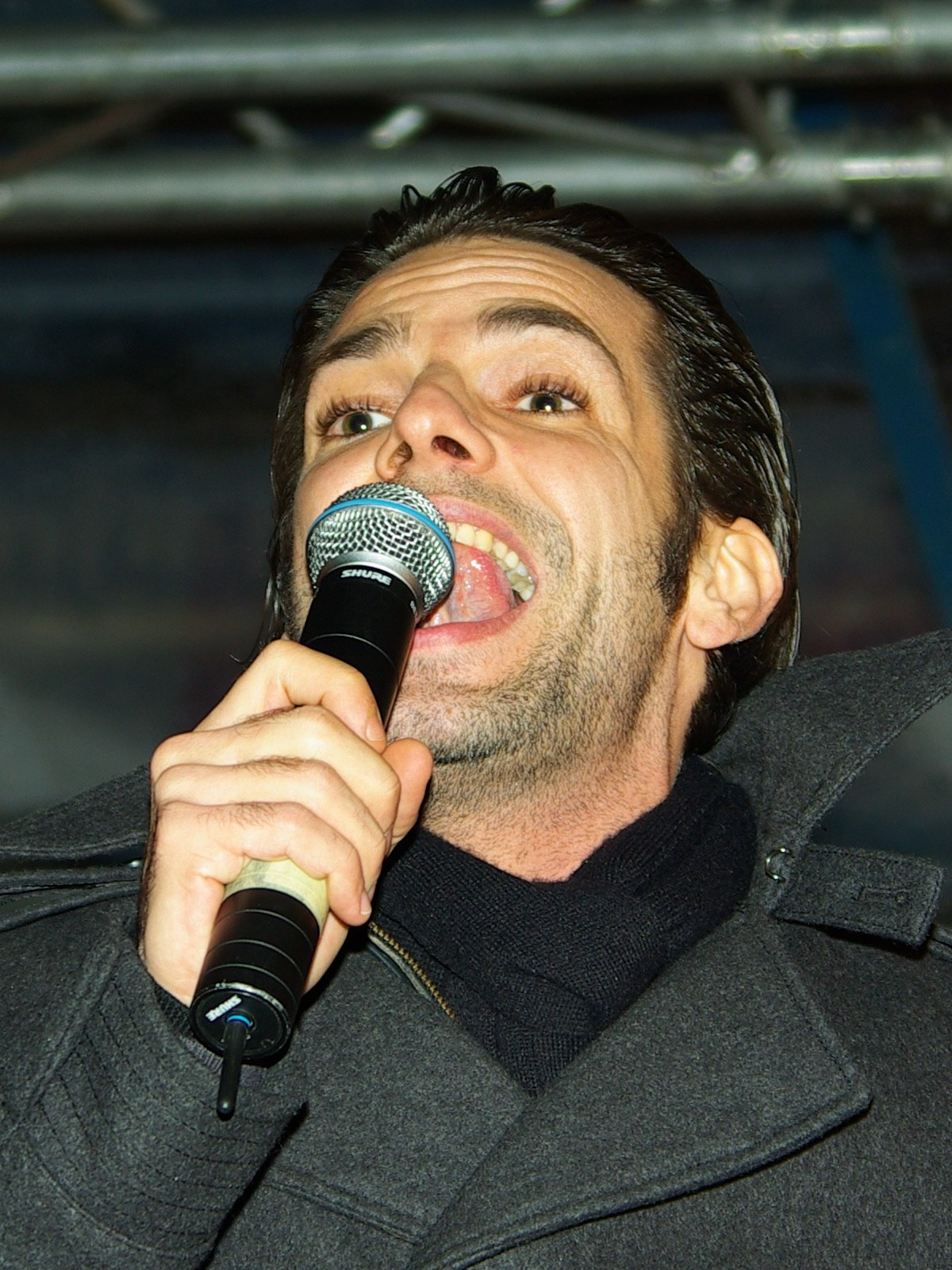
- Manuel Ortega, January 2008

Background information
- Born: Manuel Hanke; 8 April 1980 (age 46); Steyregg, Austria
- Occupation: Singer
- Instrument: Vocals

Manuel Hanke (born 8 April 1980), known professionally as Manuel Ortega, is an Austrian singer of Spanish origin.

== Biography ==
The son of a Spanish mother and an Austrian father, Ortega began his career as a singer when he was 10 years old. He sang with the Florianer Sängerknaben in one of the oldest choirs from Austria. His love for pop music led to him joining a band called BAFF when he was a teenager. Starting from an early age, meant Ortega has been able to make over 200 stages performances as of 2003. When he was 17, he took part in a search for talent and was chosen out of 1300 entrants to be the singer of a new group. Whilst successful, the group was not enough for Ortega and in 2001 he began a solo career.

The song El Amor, La Vida was the Austrian summer hit of 2001. In 2002 he represented Austria in the Eurovision Song Contest with the song Say A Word. He participated in the 3rd Season of the Ukrainian Dancing With the Stars (so-called International League of Champions) where he danced with the Ukrainian ballroom dancer, and Eurovision Dance Contest 2007 runner-up Yulia Okropiridze.

Awards and achievements
Preceded by Marika Lichter & Andy Kainz	Dancing Stars winner Season 2 (2006 with Kelly Kainz)	Succeeded by Klaus Eberhartinger & Kelly Kainz
Preceded by The Rounder Girls with "All to You"	Austria in the Eurovision Song Contest; 2002	Succeeded by Alf Poier with "Weil der Mensch zählt"
