= Sparta (film) =

- Festival poster
- Directed by: Ulrich Seidl
- Screenplay by: Ulrich Seidl; Veronika Franz
- Produced by: Ulrich Seidl; Philippe Bober; Michel Merkt
- Starring: Georg Friedrich; Florentina Elena Pop; Hans-Michael Rehberg; Marius Ignat; Octavian-Nicolae Cocis
- Cinematography: Wolfgang Thaler; Serafin Spitzer
- Edited by: Monika Willi
- Production companies: Ulrich Seidl Filmproduktion; Essential Films; Parisienne de Production; Bayerischer Rundfunk; Arte France Cinéma
- Distributed by: Stadtkino Filmverleih (Austria); Neue Visionen (Germany); Damned Films (France)
- Release dates: 18 September 2022 (Zinemaldia); 5 May 2023 (Austria); 18 May 2023 (Germany); 31 May 2023 (France)
- Running time: 99 minutes
- Countries: Austria; France; Germany
- Languages: German; Romanian
- Budget: €4.5 million

Sparta is a 2022 drama film directed by Ulrich Seidl. It depicts an Austrian man named Ewald who is a non-offending pedophile and teaches judo to boys in Romania. The film is the second in a diptych; the other film, Rimini, centres on Ewald's brother.

On 2 September 2022, Der Spiegel published allegations by crew members, child actors, and their guardians that children were exploited on set and that their guardians were not sufficiently informed about the film's subject. The 2022 Toronto International Film Festival, where it was scheduled to have its world premiere, cancelled the screenings in light of the allegations. It premiered in competition at the 70th San Sebastián International Film Festival on 18 September 2022.

== Cast ==
- Georg Friedrich as Ewald
- Florentina Elena Pop as Ewald's girlfriend
- Hans-Michael Rehberg as Father
- Marius Ignat as Octavian's stepfather
- Octavian-Nicolae Cocis as Octavian

== Production ==
Written by Seidl and Veronika Franz, Rimini and Sparta were originally conceived and shot as one film titled Wicked Games (German: Böse Spiele), and were split into two during the post-production. Based on the story of a German man arrested in Romania in 2010, Sparta was filmed in Germany, Austria, and Romania. Filming in Romania took place in the winter of 2018–2019 and the summer of 2019. The primary location was the village of Baba Novac, Ardud, near the city of Satu Mare in northern Romania.

== Allegations of on-set abuse ==
=== Spiegel article ===
On 2 September 2022, Der Spiegel published a report of allegations of child exploitation during the production of Sparta in Romania, based on interviews with "dozens" of crew members, nine of whom were present on set in Romania, nine local non-professional actors, seven of whom were underage, and "the guardians of eight children involved in the movie". The allegations include that actors and their parents were not informed that the film addressed pedophilia or that some of them would perform in their underwear, that child actors were often filmed without their knowledge, and that parents and two teachers hired to oversee the children were denied entry to the set.

A ten-year-old boy was cast as a character who, in one scene, is told to drink alcohol and caressed by two drunk men, the filming of which led him to cry and vomit. Several workers told Der Spiegel that they were aware that the boy had an abusive alcoholic father, and one claimed that Seidl cast him in the role specifically because of his background. Two workers claimed that an assistant director forcibly removed clothes off a boy on set. Another boy told Der Spiegel that he was in a scene with Friedrich in the shower while Friedrich was naked and shaving his pubic hair, and that he was asked if he wanted to take off his underwear too. A local man, who gets aggressive when he drinks by his own admission, told Der Spiegel that he was offered alcohol by the crew before performing in a scene in which he grabs a boy by his ear, and that Seidl told him to do so harder after a take. In Romania, parents are required to contact authorities and get approval from a paediatrician and a psychologist before allowing their children to be in a film. Parents of actors in Sparta and the head of Seidl's production told Der Spiegel that they were not aware of these requirements.

On 26 October 2022, Die Welt reported that Austrian organisation FC Gloria may have been instrumental in initiating the Spiegel investigation. FC Gloria issued a statement denying "in the strongest possible terms" that its board members approached Der Spiegel, adding that the organisation "does not see it as its task to act against individuals, but is committed to the structural improvement of gender equality in the Austrian film industry".

=== Further allegations ===
A former assistant to Seidl told the Berliner Zeitung that she was not informed of what the film would be about when she was tasked with recruiting actors in Satu Mare and that she resigned after she passed along inquiries from Romanian families and Seidl's answers remained vague.

On 13 September 2022, Falter published further allegations based on accounts of six people involved in the production of Sparta and Rimini. A Romanian casting assistant, who also worked on set as an interpreter, confirmed that she was instructed not to reveal the subject of pedophilia during casting. She also said she was appointed a child carer mid-production despite her lack of pedagogical training. Another crew member claimed that a car driven by Friedrich with seven children hit a post and was damaged during filming, without stunt performers or safety precautions, though no one was injured. A boy with a high fever was allegedly not allowed to go home for hours in case Seidl needed him. A Romanian-speaking worker involved in pre-production said the filmmakers were specifically seeking boys from broken families.

=== Official investigations ===
On 23 July 2019, Satu Mare police received a tip that "various acts of violence" had been inflicted on children during the production of a film in Baba Novac. They launched an investigation, which was closed in February 2022. The final report included testimonies from six minors that they did not experience harassment during the production. According to Seidl, the investigation was prompted by rumours spread by a website, which took them down after Seidl contacted it through a lawyer in Romania.

Days after the publication of the Spiegel article, the Directorate for Investigating Organized Crime and Terrorism (DIICOT) and the General Directorate of Social Assistance and Child Protection (DGASPC) of Satu Mare County started investigations. However, in August 2023, Seidl said he had not been contacted by Romanian authorities.

The Austrian Film Institute, which funded the diptych with €1.3 million, launched an investigation and demanded documents such as contracts and consent forms from Seidl's company. Other sponsors such as ORF and Bayerischer Rundfunk also expressed intention to examine the case. On 7 December 2022, the Austrian Film Institute announced that it found no violation of the subsidy contract by Seidl's company and therefore would not demand the return of the funds. According to Seidl, Austria's Finanzprokuratur also conducted an investigation and found no violation.

=== Seidl's response ===
In response to the Spiegel article, Seidl issued a statement that said, "incorrect descriptions, rumors and events on the set of Sparta taken out of context have been woven into a distorted picture that in no way corresponds to the facts ... I have the greatest respect for all my actors and would never take a decision that could in any way endanger their physical and psychological wellbeing." Seidl said that "[t]he young actors were under constant supervision" and that he "explained all the essential elements of the film to the parents in numerous one-on-one conversations (with an interpreter) prior to shooting", including "the ambivalence of the character of Ewald" and "his relationship to children".

On 1 October 2022, Profil published an interview with Seidl, marking the first time he spoke to media about the allegations. He said he explained to actors' parents that the film was "about a man who wants to be around children and is attracted to them, who is also tender with them", before the cast was filled. Seidl told Profil, "I would never work with people who feel even the slightest discomfort about my films." He attributed the accusations in part to his not maintaining contact with child actors' families after the shoot, which he said was "a massive mistake". After the Spiegel article was published, Seidl made two trips to Romania to reconnect with the families and show the film, which he said they received positively. Seidl said, "they were glad that nothing problematic happened to their children at any moment. There was no objection to a single scene."

Seidl said he understands that an image of a scene in which an abusive stepfather forces liquor on a boy, which was shot with a minimal crew, gave some others on set the impression of wrongdoing and was the ultimate cause of the controversy. He said the scene was rehearsed, the actor knew it was about his character confronting the stepfather, though he did not know his character would be forced liquor on, and Seidl discussed the scene with the actor afterwards. Seidl said the actor said he cried because his mother might think he had drunk alcohol. Seidl said that the actor vomited on the drive home after shooting, and that his parents said he often gets carsick. Seidl said he does not know if the actor playing the stepfather was drunk, but he would not prohibit an actor who is a habitual drinker from drinking, and it was his responsibility to make sure the alcoholism does not lead to an uncontrollable or violent situation. Seidl denied that a feverish boy was left uncared for, and said that the crew laid him to see if the fever was temporary and then took him to a doctor, and that his family was grateful. Seidl characterised Falter's reporting of an alleged car accident as "completely false", and said the car only "rubbed against a concrete plug in which a carpet hanger pole was stuck" and no children were on board.

Describing his working method, Seidl said he does not distribute the script on set, shoots with a minimal crew, and wants "everyone to behave as if the camera is rolling all the time" in order to create "an intimate atmosphere" and be able to shoot spontaneously. He said some workers joined Sparta mid-production and resigned after a few days, apparently dissatisfied, but he did not receive complaints from them. Seidl said he relied on a Romanian service provider and "assumed that all guidelines and requirements were fully complied with", but the crew "took care of the children's well-being throughout" and "never exceeded the shooting times". Seidl said his lesson from the controversy was to communicate better with his crew.

Seidl told Profil that he was given 48 hours to answer questions by Der Spiegel. Authors of the Spiegel article disputed this on Twitter, saying they sent the questions on 29 August 2022 and received replies from Seidl's lawyer on 1 September.

On 3 October 2022, the Süddeutsche Zeitung published an interview with Seidl, coinciding with the German release of Rimini. Seidl said the showing of Sparta to the parents of child actors was "a very gratifying experience because everyone was able to confirm that there was nothing in the film that they might have feared after all the newspaper reports". Seidl said he did not use the word "pedophilia" when explaining the film to parents before casting so as not to give the wrong impression that sexualised scenes would be filmed. He said there were no psychologists on set "because that was not necessary".

A number of publications ran interviews with Seidl on 20 October 2022, the day before the film's Austrian premiere at the Viennale.

=== Key crew members' accounts ===
On 10 September 2022, Profil published an article by film critic Stefan Grissemann featuring quotes from Seidl's collaborators. Assistant director and production manager Klaus Pridnig and cinematographer Wolfgang Thaler said Seidl builds trust and works respectfully with his actors, and expressed scepticism towards the allegations. Pridnig said, "Everyone knew what Sparta was about. We of course informed all parents about this, and of course made it clear that no child would be confronted with sexuality or violence in any way." He said young women working in Romanian theatre and film, who were responsible for casting, accompanied the shooting as carers. Pridnig, production designer Andreas Donhauser, and costume designer Tanja Hausner said young actors had an amicable environment on set.

On 17 September 2022, Profil published another article quoting key crew members. Production manager Steven Swirko said that Seidl explained the details of the film to actors' parents, but not to the actors themselves "because they were never directly affected by [pedophilia] during filming" and "everything happens inside the main character". Swirko said that the two carers were on set every day and that parents were always present "during the exterior shooting, which mostly took place at the children's actual homes". Swirko denied that a feverish boy was left uncared for, and said the crew took him to a doctor and his family expressed gratitude. He also disputed the alleged details of the car accident and said it was a metal rod on the ground, Friedrich never lost control, and the car only took minor damage. Monika Willi, editor of the diptych, said she saw no evidence of impropriety in the footage she assembled the films from.

Describing Seidl's directing method, cinematographer Serafin Spitzer, who replaced Thaler for the summer shoot, told Profil that Seidl shoots with a small crew, allowing only the essential members on set, in order to achieve as much concentration and camera coverage as possible, and that he prefers to isolate sections of his crew rather than make them collaborate and share information with each other. Spitzer said that, shooting long takes amid intense heat, and often having to react to the situation for the first time, he had to work with the assumption "that all participants were well informed about the project and knew what extreme situation they were getting into", which he said "concerns [him] very much" in retrospect. Spitzer added that it was difficult for him "to determine today which allegations are actually true" because "the fact no team member knew the entire scenic content and no one was allowed to talk about it even after the camera was turned off inevitably led to different and severely limited perceptions".

=== Reaction ===
On 3 October 2022, the Austrian Directors Guild, of which Seidl and Franz are members, issued a statement criticising "hasty and unwarranted public reactions" and calling on media and institutions for "a thorough and unbiased examination of the facts".

A German company withdrew from co-producing Moon, a film directed by Kurdwin Ayub and produced by Seidl, in light of the allegations.

== Release ==
Sparta was scheduled to have its world premiere at the Toronto International Film Festival on 9 September 2022, but the festival cancelled the screenings the day before the premiere in light of the allegations reported by Der Spiegel. Five screenings were scheduled including press and industry screenings, at least one of which took place. A festival representative said, "Sparta had been scheduled to premiere in TIFF's Contemporary World Cinema section, but given these allegations, we will no longer present the film. We consider Mr. Seidl to be an important contemporary filmmaker and we look forward to further clarity being brought to the issues of the film's production raised by Der Spiegel."

The film premiered in competition at the 70th San Sebastián International Film Festival on 18 September 2022. In the wake of the allegations, festival director José Luis Rebordinos said that the festival was not in a position to judge how a film was made or whether a crime was committed in the process, and that only a court order that establishes it would lead the festival to cancel a screening. Ahead of the festival, Rebordinos said, "We cannot allow the presumption of guilt to replace that of innocence and intervene in the decision whether or not to program a film", adding that a "true moralist epidemic" was threatening freedom of expression. Seidl and Friedrich were to attend the premiere as of 12 September, but Seidl cancelled the attendance the day before the premiere, stating, "I have realized that my presence at the premiere might overshadow how the film was received. Now is the time for the film to speak for itself." The screenings reportedly ended with applause. A message from Seidl was read at the beginning of the first public screening, in which he said, "I am in Romania at the moment where I have shown the film to the parents and children who are in the movie."

The German premiere took place at the Filmfest Hamburg on 5 October 2022, with Seidl in attendance. The festival, which also screened Rimini, originally planned to present its annual Douglas Sirk Award to Seidl. On 13 September 2022, it issued a statement explaining that the plan had been made before the allegations surfaced and was abandoned because the allegations "would overshadow an award ceremony", and that it would proceed with the screening because "[t]he accusations against Ulrich Seidl are directed against the conditions during the shooting and explicitly not against his film". At the premiere, it was announced that Seidl remains the recipient and a ceremony would be held next year. However, the festival's website later said the presentation of the award would take place "at the German premiere of his next film in Hamburg".

The North American premiere took place at the Festival du nouveau cinéma in Montreal on 12 October 2022. Festival executive director Nicolas Girard Deltruc said, "It's important, rather than censoring, to present the work so we can judge and talk about it. I think a festival must be made for that."

The Austrian premiere took place at the 60th Viennale on 21 October 2022. On 28 September 2022, the festival issued a statement saying the inclusion "is not meant to be an expression of exoneration" but the festival does not "wish to be part of a prejudgement against a director or film". Seidl suggested that child actors attend the premiere, but this was declined by the festival. A video speech by writer Michael Köhlmeier in defence of Seidl was played after the screening.

The 2022 Ji.hlava International Documentary Film Festival decided to screen the film, while also hosting its first annual conference on ethics in documentary filmmaking. Festival director Marek Hovorka said, "We don't want to be hypocritical, but to create an opportunity to watch the film and continue the discussion about the ethical responsibility of filmmakers." Hiroyasu Andō, chairman of the Tokyo International Film Festival, which selected the film, said, "we are aware that the Toronto Film Festival canceled its screening, but as far as I know, it has not been confirmed that the child actors and their guardians asked for that. We made the decision to go ahead because there was no specific reason to cancel the screening."

The film was released in Austria on 5 May 2023. Wicked Games: Rimini Sparta, a 205-minute film consisting of Rimini and Sparta edited together, premiered at the International Film Festival Rotterdam on 29 January 2023. It screened at the Filmarchiv Austria on 4 March 2023, and at the Diagonale on 25 March 2023.

== Reception ==
Mike Thomas of Cinema Scope wrote that, while Seidl and Friedrich "succeed in rendering Ewald a classical tragic hero, thus creating an intense dialectical viewing experience", the film's "sympathy-for-the-devil conceit distracts from an otherwise compelling exploration of themes that stretches across Sparta and Rimini", namely "critiques of masculinity and neo-colonialism". Ed Frankl of The Film Stage gave the film a C grade, writing, "Sparta is one of [Seidl's] lesser works, carrying much of his traditional oblique downcastness, but less of the satirical bite and visual richness that elevated films like his Paradise trilogy".
