= The Candy Kid (1917 film) =

1917 film

- Directed by: Arvid E. Gillstrom
- Produced by: Louis Burstein
- Starring: Billy West; Oliver Hardy
- Release date: October 15, 1917
- Running time: 13 minutes (2 reels)
- Country: United States
- Languages: Silent film English intertitles

Full film

The Candy Kid is a 1917 American silent two-reel comedy short featuring Billy West and Oliver Hardy.. The film is viewable free of charge on YouTube. It was produced by King Bee Comedies.

== Plot ==
Two rival candy and ice-cream shops that face each other across a street try to steal each other's customers. White's shop advertises for a "strong brave man" and the Candy Kid is sixth in line. White wants them to bomb the other shop. The Candy Kid dresses as Charlie Chaplin's tramp.

The Candy Kid gets the job. He accidentally ignites the bomb fuse in White's shop and it is thrown from person to person until the fuse is put out. His job is then explained. He asks a policeman for a match. He has to throw the bomb away when the policeman comes back. It hits a woman on the head. The Kid throws the bomb away from the woman back across the street. It lands in White's rear room and explodes.

The woman takes the Kid into Hardy's shop to reward him. She asks Hardy to give him a job but he refuses. He gets pushed into the back shop and knocks into the cook. The cook starts to attack him but hits Hardy instead. The Kid gets the job and a uniform. He claims there are "flies" and starts swatting with a carpet beater bashing Hardy on the head.

== Cast ==
- Billy West as the Candy Kid
- Ethel Cassity as the Cashier
- Oliver Hardy (as Babe Hardy) as first rival proprietor
- Leo White as second rival proprietor
- Bud Ross as the Cook

== See also ==
- List of American films of 1917
