= Frucade =

Soft Drink

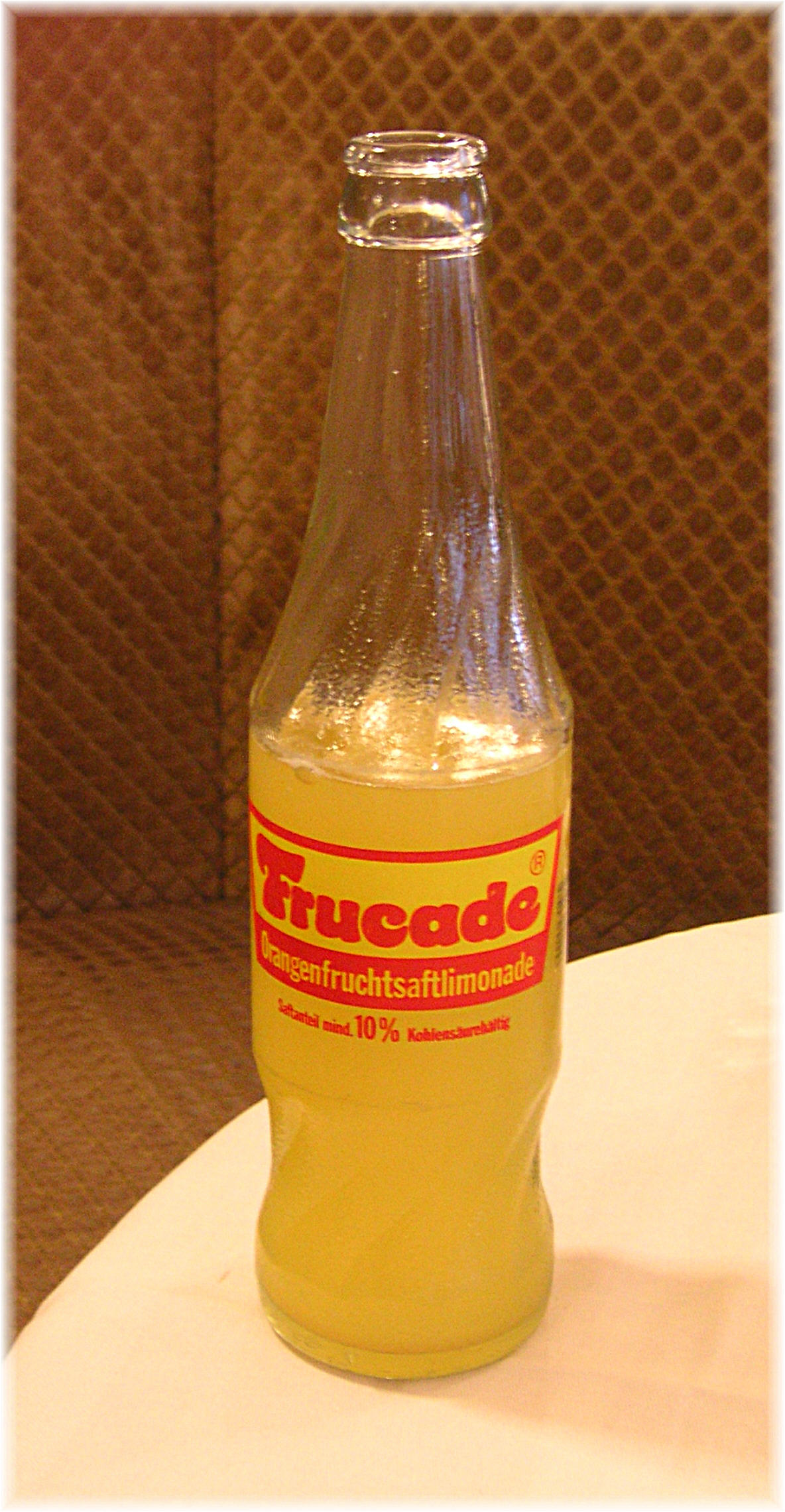
A bottle of Frucade served at a Viennese café in 2005

Frucade is a soft drink created in 1953 in Rosenheim, Bavaria by Adalbert Conrads and Karl Grün. It is a carbonated orange drink, with a slight taste of exotic fruits.

Frucade was spotlighted in the 1995 ORF Nette Leit Show (Nice People Show), when it was offered by host Hermes Phettberg to guests as an alternative to eggnog. This drink is similar to Fanta. It is packaged in a 24 × 0.5 PET bottle.

The brand has changed ownership several times since its creation, and is currently produced under licence by regional bottling companies in Central Europe.

The drink is found in multiple European countries, predominantly in Germany, Austria, Luxembourg, and Switzerland.

== See also ==
- List of brand name soft drinks products
- List of soft drink flavors
