= Fritz Ostermayer =

Austrian author, radio presenter, DJ and musician (born 1956)

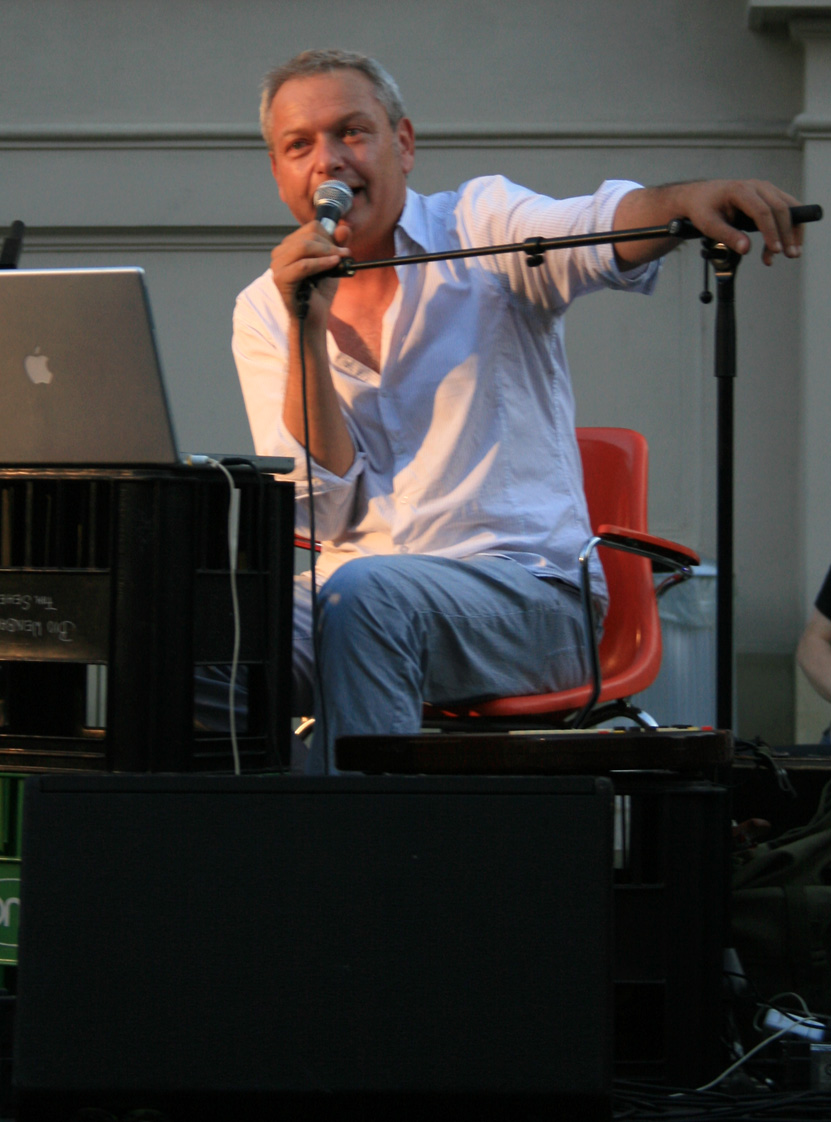
- Ostermayer in Vienna, 2008

Background information
- Born: 1956 (age 69–70); Schattendorf, Burgenland, Austria
- Occupations: Author, radio presenter, DJ, musician, journalist
- Label: Mego

Fritz Ostermayer (born 1956 in Schattendorf, Burgenland) is an Austrian author, radio presenter, DJ, musician and cultural journalist. He is associated with his long-standing work for the Austrian public broadcaster ORF and the radio station FM4, especially the programme Im Sumpf, which he has presented together with Thomas Edlinger.

== Life and career ==
Ostermayer studied theatre studies and electroacoustic music. He worked as a music and cultural journalist for publications including Der Standard, profil and Falter. According to the City of Vienna, he first worked as a cultural editor at Falter and as a music editor at Der Standard before becoming active as a radio maker for ORF programmes such as Die Musicbox, Diagonal and Kunstradio.

After the foundation of FM4, Ostermayer became one of the station's programme makers. He is associated with the programmes Im Sumpf, Graue Lagune and the former Doppelzimmer, the latter two also involving his long-time collaborator Thomas Edlinger. The City of Vienna has described Im Sumpf as an award-winning cultural and music programme.

Ostermayer is regarded as an important supporter of Austrian underground and alternative culture. The City of Vienna credited him with helping to shape Austrian alternative culture through his work as a radio presenter, author, musician and curator. He also gave early platforms to musicians and artists including Christoph & Lollo and monochrom.

From 2012 until 2024, Ostermayer was artistic director of the Vienna School of Poetry, succeeding the institution's founder Christian Ide Hintze, who died in 2012. He has also worked as a curator, including for steirischer herbst and Wiener Kultursommer.

== Music ==
As a musician, Ostermayer has worked in various constellations, including the duo Oder Haha with Christa Tekirdaly, Musikkreis MS20, Die Nuts, Der Scheitel, Viele bunte Autos, Passepartout and Sir Tralala. He has also collaborated with artists such as Otomo Yoshihide, Christof Kurzmann, Ramon Bauer, Gerhard Potuznik, Stermann & Grissemann, and with David Pfister, Christian Fuchs and Robert Zikmund as part of Neigungsgruppe Sex, Gewalt & Gute Laune.

Ostermayer has produced remixes for acts including Tigric, Fetish 69, monochrom and Hommage.

He compiled several albums for Trikont, including Dead & Gone #1: Trauermärsche – Funeral Marches, Dead & Gone #2: Totenlieder – Songs of Death and Im Sumpf – Musik, zu gut für diese Welt (Vol. 2).

His debut solo album, Kitsch Concrète, was released by Mego in 2003. Pitchfork described the album as combining Ostermayer's roles as a broadcaster, author, DJ and musician with elements of electronic music, torch song and musique concrète.

== Film music ==
Ostermayer has contributed music to several films, including:

- Ternitz, Tennessee (2000)
- Normale Zeiten (2001)
- Rimini (2022), with Herwig Zamernik
- Sparta (2022), with Herwig Zamernik

For Ulrich Seidl's Rimini, Ostermayer and Herwig Zamernik wrote and composed songs performed by the film's fictional schlager singer Richie Bravo. They received the 2022 ROMY award for Best Music for their work on the film.

== Publications ==
- Gott ist ein Tod aus der Steckdose. Edition Selene, Vienna, 1994. ISBN 3-85266-014-9.
- Fritz Ostermayer and Hermes Phettberg: Hermes Phettberg räumt seine Wohnung zamm. Edition Selene, Vienna, 1995. ISBN 3-85266-019-X.
- Fritz Ostermayer and Thomas Edlinger: Die Sumpfprotokolle. Edition Selene, Vienna, 1998. ISBN 3-85266-061-0.
- Fritz Ostermayer and Thomas Edlinger: Die Gutmenschenprotokolle. Edition Selene, Vienna, 2000. ISBN 3-85266-152-8.
- Fritz Ostermayer, Thomas Edlinger and Johannes Grenzfurthner: Wer erschoss Immanenz? Zur Dynamik von Aneignung und Intervention bei Georg Paul Thomann. Edition Selene, Vienna, 2002. ISBN 3-85266-183-8.
- Fritz Ostermayer and Thomas Edlinger: Die Traumprotokolle der Sumpfisten.

== Awards ==
- 2022: ROMY award for Best Music for Rimini, together with Herwig Zamernik
- 2025: Golden Decoration of Merit of the State of Vienna
