= NightWash =

German television series

- Genre: Stand-up comedy in a laundrette
- Created by: Klaus-Jürgen Deuser
- Starring: Klaus-Jürgen Deuser
- Country of origin: Germany

Production
- Running time: 30 minutes

Original release
- Network: 2001-2006 Westdeutscher Rundfunk (WDR) 2007-2009 Comedy Central 2009-present Einsfestival
- Release: 14 October 2001

NightWash is a German television comedy show in which young artists and new stand-up comedy talents have the opportunity to perform in front of an audience with their program, typically lasting for 7–10 minutes. The series was created by, and is produced and presented by Klaus-Jürgen Deuser. The series made its TV debut on 14 October 2001 on WDR TV; it had existed as a live show since 2000. From 2007 until October 2009, it was broadcast on Comedy Central, and since November 2009, it has been aired on digital channel Einsfestival. The original series was set in a coin-operated laundrette in the Belgian quarter of Cologne.

== History ==
NightWash began as a live show in 2000. Aside from the laundrette scenario, the unusual name is also a reference to the name of the rock band Nightwish. Deuser was influenced in choosing the format of the show by his experiences in the New York City comedy scene. The window sill was a stage, with the audience sitting on the benches, which were usually in front of the washing machines. In the show's original version, Deuser stood on a platform next to tumble dryers. Often, unsuspecting customers or passers-byers were incorporated into the program with a comedian.

NightWash was initially shown from 2001 to 2006 on WDR television and Das Erste (one series, October 2003). From 18 January 2007 to October 2009, the show was broadcast on Germany' Comedy Central Germany. From 30 September 2007, the television programs were initially recorded in Cologne's Gloria-Theater. Deuser explained at the beginning of the first episode of the new series that the laundry had closed for economic reasons. In spite of the new venue, most of the known elements from the laundrette format were retained.

Since changing to German digital channel Einsfestival in November 2009, the show has been recorded in a launderette in Köln-Zollstock, a southern district of Cologne, although live shows have continued to be performed on stage in the Gloria-Theater. Comedians such as Hennes Bender, Mario Barth, Heinz Gröning, and Holger Müller made their television débuts on the show.

== Shows ==
=== TV shows ===
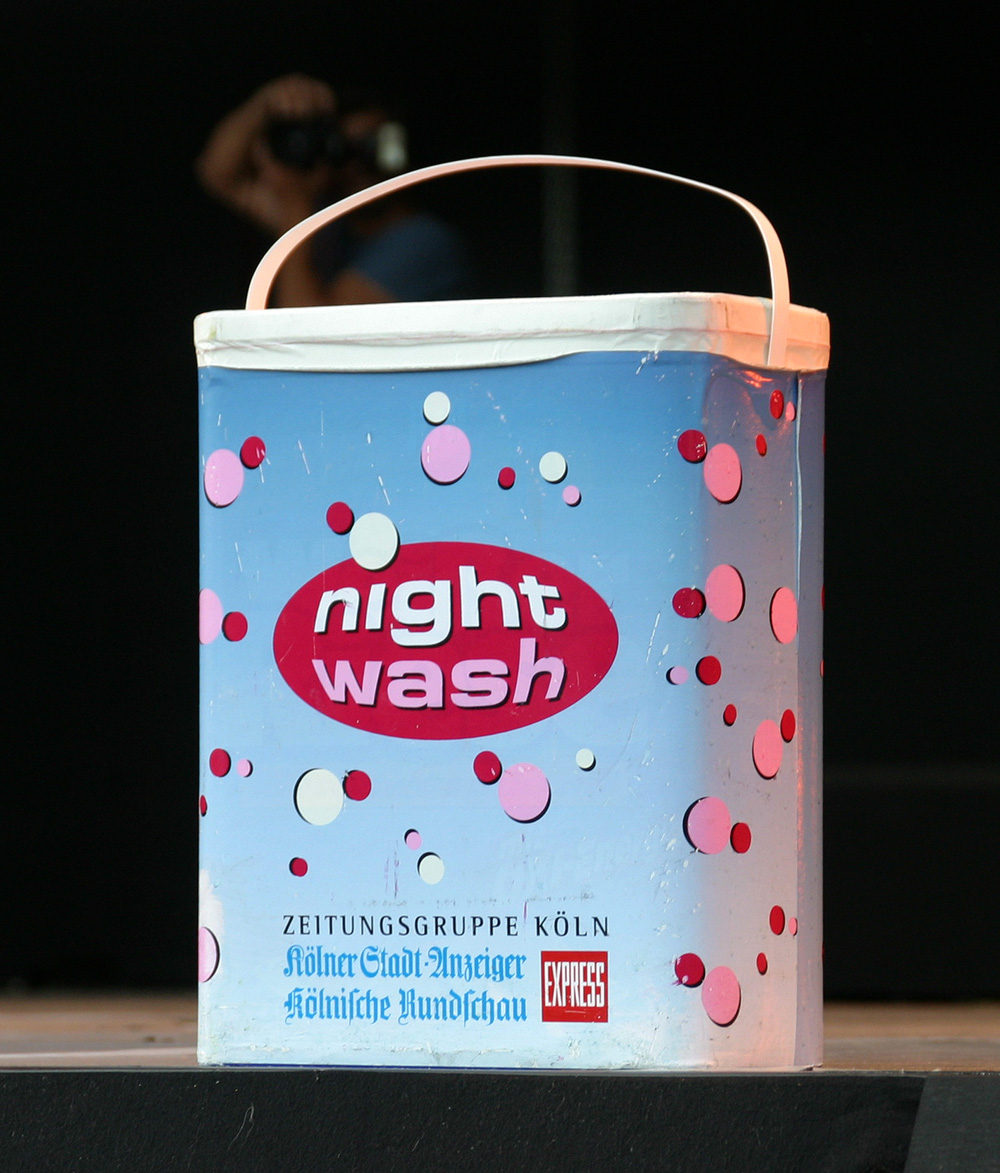
A laundry bag displaying NightWash

- 'NightWash:' The original format, set in a laundry
- 'NightWash Spin' Under the title "NightWash Spin Cycle - the best of the Laundry" EinsFestival has, since December 2009, broadcast highlights of the comedy format show.
- 'NightWash Special' NightWash Special is an evolution of the format where inventor and presenter Klaus-Jürgen Deuser presents a comedian, who plays a half-hour live stage show to the audience. The stage show is filmed for television and broadcast on Comedy Central.
- 'NightWash Ultra:' NightWash Ultra is a special unmoderated format set in the laundry. The moderator Klaus-Jürgen Deuser and Alex Flucht do short transitions between performances in which they are shown, for example when shopping or having breakfast. Recordings of each show are shown on video.nightwash.de and comedy platform myspass.de.

=== Live shows ===
- 'NightWash Club:' In addition to the television broadcast, NightWash tours with a live show throughout Germany. On tour, the show is presented by Klaus-Jürgen Deuser and Alex Flucht. The format has amassed a Germany-wide club system. There are now NightWash clubs in 21 German cities.
- 'NightWash Live:' Since early 2008, every few weeks a NightWash live show takes place in a laundromat in Cologne again, now in the southern suburb of Zollstock (Eco-Express Laundromat on Höninger Weg 134).
