= Hermes Phettberg =

Austrian artist and comedian (1952–2024)

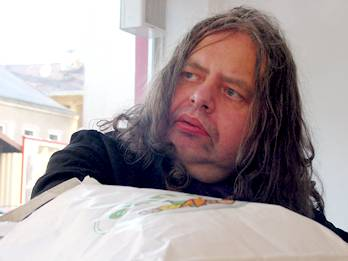
Hermes Phettberg

Hermes Phettberg (born Josef Fenz; 5 October 1952 – 18 December 2024) was an Austrian artist, comedian, actor, author and talk show host. The first name of his pen name was taken from the ancient Greek god Hermes. The last name means "fat mountain", but is written as Phettberg instead of Fettberg as an ironic hint to his Greek-sounding first name.

== Early life and career ==
Phettberg grew up in the village of Unternalb near Retz in a family of winegrowers. Following a brief stint as a bank clerk and continued education, he became assistant vicar with the Roman Catholic Archdiocese of Vienna.

In the mid-1980s, he was co-founder of the groups Libertine Sadomasochismusinitiative Wien and of project Polymorph Perverse Klinik Wien.

== 1990s ==
Beginning in 1991, he participated in productions of the theatre group Sparverein Die Unz-Ertrennlichen.

In 1992, Phettberg began writing the column "Phettbergs Predigtdienst" (Phettberg's sermon) for the weekly Vienna magazine Falter. The column is written in the form of a sermon, building upon the scripture passages for each respective Sunday in the Catholic liturgical year. After a health-related hiatus (see below), he resumed writing in early 2007. From 12 November 1994, and throughout 1995, he was the host of the ORF talk show Phettbergs Nette Leit Show, which featured interviews with primarily Viennese celebrities, scientists, and people from exotic occupation groups. The opening question for the guests, "Frucade oder Eierlikör?" (Frucade or eggnog) became well-known and was also used as the title of a book featuring excerpts from interviews during the show's run.

When ORF broadcast 19 episodes of the show from June 1995 to April 1996, Phettberg quickly gained fame with a larger audience in Austria as well as Germany and Switzerland, owing to his unconventional questions and the relentless presentation of his own problems, sexual phantasies, and celebration of gaps in his general education.

A draft résumé from 1999 translates as: "Am pornographer, columnist and wreck. Would like to talk."

== 2000s ==
In 2000, Phettberg pioneered internet broadcasting with a weekly show, in which he delivered his Phettberg's sermon column while being bonded and whipped.

In March 2001, together with Thomas Holzinger, he produced a full week, or 168 hours of continuous live internet broadcast, during which Phettberg was guarded in the prison of the so-called Arche Phettberg (also the title of the show) by half-naked young men in blue jeans.

Also in 2001, he appeared as himself in the TV documentary Gipfeltreffen - Hermes Phettberg trifft Helge Schneider by Roger Willemsen.

In 2003 and 2004, Austrian terrestrial TV station ATVplus featured him in a show called Beichtphater Phettberg, produced and directed by his recurring team of artist companions: Thomas Holzinger, Mandy E. Mante and Paul Poet.

After then, Phettberg participated in a variety of artistic and public sexual performances, as well as in numerous talk shows. He was also a proponent for the foundation of a "University of Pornography and Prostitution".

Kurt Palm did a documentary about and with Phettberg in 2007, "Hermes Phettberg - Elender" (Hermes Phettberg - Miserable). The documentary revolves around Phettberg's stroke as well about Phettberg's childhood and early life, trying to explain his interest in sadomasochism and his chronic depression.

=== Illness and death ===
On 23 October 2006, Phettberg suffered a stroke, followed by another shortly after. His condition and the subsequent long therapy and rehabilitation phase forced him into a work hiatus. During rehab, he lost 70 kilograms in weight.

Phettberg died on 18 December 2024, at the age of 72.

== Phettberg in fiction ==
In 1995, Fritz Ostermayer and Hermes Phettberg together wrote and published Hermes Phettberg räumt seine Wohnung zamm ("Hermes Phettberg tidies up his apartment").

In 1999, Austrian author Franzobel published a play named Phettberg: Eine Hermes-tragödie which premiered at the Vienna Volkstheater. The play is loosely centered on an exaggerated version of Hermes Phettberg's life and character.

The epigraph in Michael Lentz's book Muttersterben is credited to Hermes Phettberg.
