= Malediva =

German chanson and cabaret trio

Malediva was a German chanson and cabaret trio, consisting of

- Lo Malinke (born 1970) – vocals, texts, lyrics
- Tetta Müller (born 1970) – vocals, texts, stage design, costume
- Florian Ludewig (born 1975) – piano, composer

All members live in Berlin and performed in Germany, Switzerland and Austria. In May 2014 Malediva cancelled the remaining tourdates for their newest show 'Barhocker' and announced their professional breakup for health reasons.

== Topics ==
Malediva's preferred topics are mainly human relationships and "living in the province". Their lyrics and texts are often based on their own biography, and reflect the relations between the members of the group.

Though Lo and Tetta are a homosexual couple, they claim their sexual orientation doesn't play a role in their performance, as the audience might suspect: during their early performances, they often shifted roles and gender, which had been supported by their androgynous makeup.

== Awards ==
- Kritiker-Preis der Berliner Zeitung, 2000
- St. Ingberter Pfanne, 2001
- Tuttlinger Krähe, Jury – und Publikumspreis, 2004
- Memminger Kabarett – Preis, 2004
- Deutscher Kleinkunstpreis – Sparte Kleinkunst –, 2006
- Marlene, Publikumspreis des Köstritzer Spiegelzeltes, Weimar 2010
- Wilhelmshavener Knurrhahn, Stadt Wilhelmshaven und Pumpwerk, Wilhelmshaven 2011

== Records ==
- CD:
  - große kundsd, Roof Music, 2000, ISBN 3-933686-45-8.
  - schaulaufen, Roof Music, 2001, ISBN 3-933686-62-8.
  - Leuchtet, Roof Music, 2003, ISBN 3-936186-23-5.
  - Heimatmelodie, Roof Music, 2004, ISBN 3-936186-70-7.
  - Ab heute verliebt!, Roof Music, 2006, ISBN 3-938781-32-7.
  - Ungeschminkt, Roof Music, 2008, ISBN 978-3-938781-84-5.
  - Lebkuchen, Roof Music, 2009, ISBN 978-3-941168-14-5.
  - Die fetten Jahre, Roof Music, 2009, ISBN 978-3-941168-11-4.
  - Schnee auf Tahiti, Roof Music, 2012, ISBN 978-3-86484-020-3.
- DVD:
  - Malediva Ab heute verliebt!, Alive, 2007, ISBN 978-3-938781-51-7.
  - Malediva – DIE FETTEN JAHRE., Roof Music, 2011, ISBN 978-3-941168-76-3.
