= Klaus-Jürgen Deuser =

German presenter and comedian

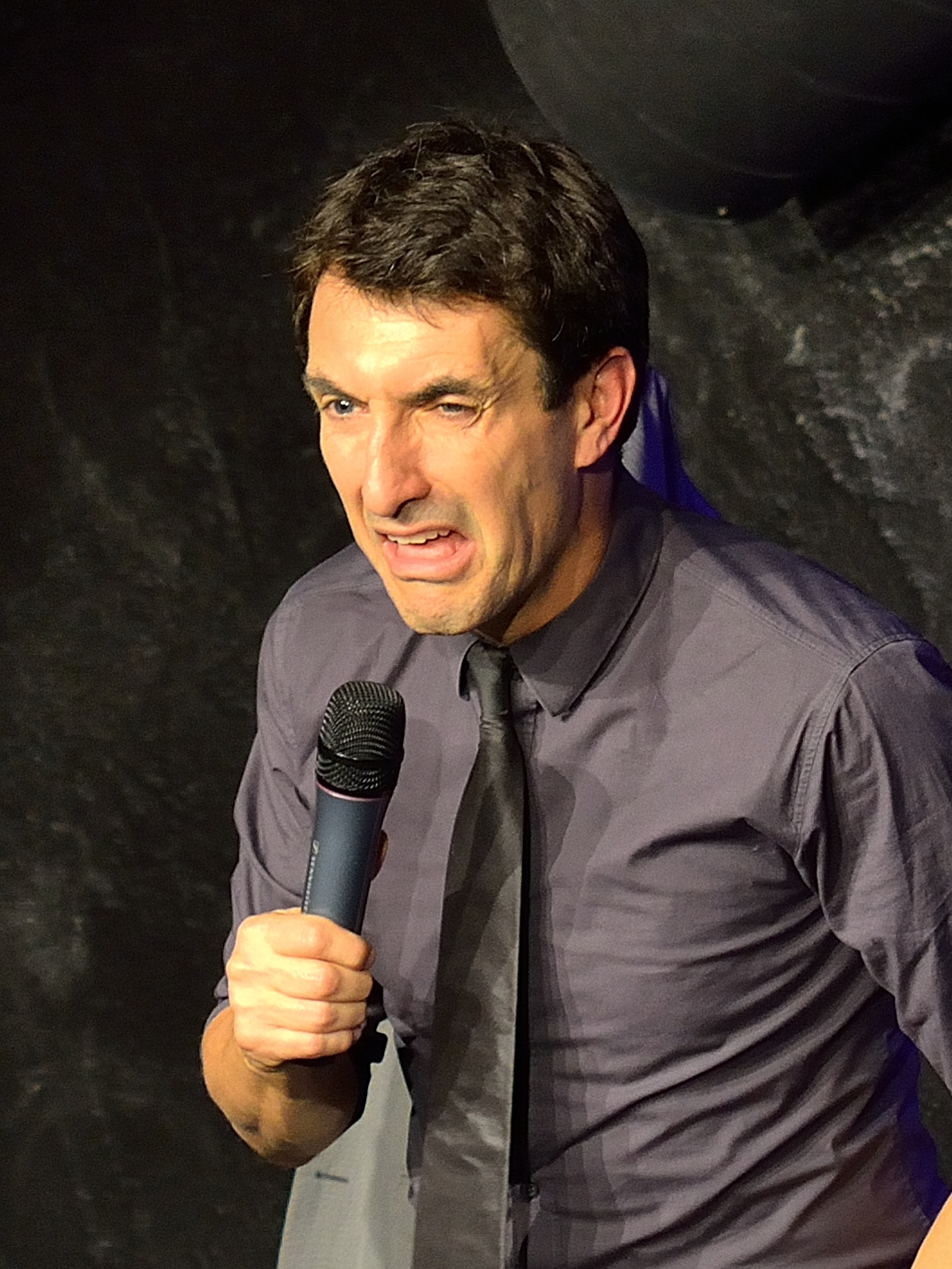
Knacki Deuser in 2012

Klaus-Jürgen "Knacki" Deuser (born 28 May 1962) is a German presenter and comedian. He is known for his comedy show NightWash.

== Biography ==
Deuser was born in 1962 in Kaiserslautern and grew up in Koblenz. After being involved in competitive sports (athletics 800–1500 m, 1981), he moved to Cologne, where he completed his business degree. In 1983, with Ralf Günther and Wolfgang Lüchtrath, he founded the comedy theatre group, The Niegelungen; they recorded more than 1,500 performances in the next eleven years.

Between 1987 and 2001, Deuser studied acting with Susan Batson and directing with Phil Bach. In 1992, Deuser made his directorial debut with A Midsummer Night's Dream in Koblenz. The following year, Deuser participated in the RTL show as MC and in 1995 won first prize in the Koblenz Children's Theatre Festival. After the foundation of the music project Saint Pank, Deuser took his first television and movie roles (Assizes, Slim until Death, Ballermann) in 1996 and was musical director for Blood Brother. In 1999, he was a regular member of the TV show Zimmer frei!. Deuser lived in New York for several months. He became known for the comedy project NightWash, which he founded in 2000. Since 2001, the comedy program has been shown on German TV (WDR, ARD, Comedy Central and at a festival); it is presented and produced by Deuser. In the show's original version, Deuser stood on a platform next to tumble dryers. Since November 2009, new episodes of NightWash have been televised as a festival.

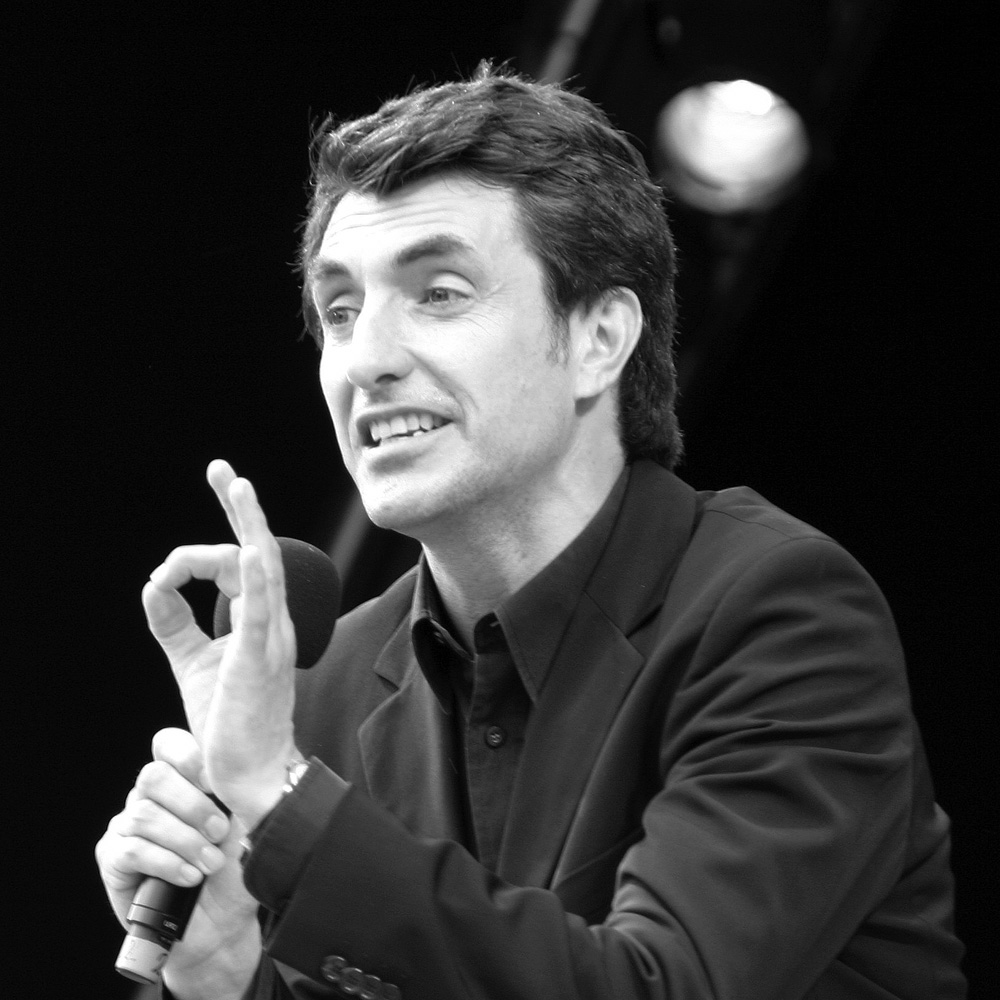
Deuser in 2006

Deuser and his company have produced CD and radio projects for comedians such as Mario Barth and Holger Müller, known for the role Instructor Schmidt. There were also productions at the German Stand Up Festival in Düsseldorf, as well as the production and presentation of the TV show Comedy-Rotation (WDR 2005). In 2003 and 2005, he was Head Coach of the TV show Star Search. In 2005/06, he designed and moderated the show Ab in die Bütt (WDR).

In November 2009, Deuser published his first book, How to be funny ... and can you live better?. In 2012, he made his debut as Büttenredner in the Cologne and Düsseldorf carnival. He appeared in ARD's nationally broadcast television show Düsseldorf Helau! and the WDR and carnival show Blötschkopp Rampensäue.
