= Rimini (film) =

- Release poster
- Directed by: Ulrich Seidl
- Screenplay by: Ulrich Seidl; Veronika Franz
- Produced by: Ulrich Seidl; Philippe Bober; Michel Merkt
- Starring: Michael Thomas; Tessa Göttlicher; Hans-Michael Rehberg
- Cinematography: Wolfgang Thaler
- Edited by: Mona Willi
- Music by: Fritz Ostermayer; Herwig Zamernik
- Production companies: Ulrich Seidl Filmproduktion; Essential Films; Parisienne de Production; Bayerischer Rundfunk; Arte France Cinéma
- Distributed by: Stadtkino Filmverleih (Austria); Neue Visionen (Germany); Damned Films (France)
- Release dates: 11 February 2022 (Berlin); 8 April 2022 (Austria); 6 October 2022 (Germany); 23 November 2022 (France)
- Running time: 114 minutes
- Countries: Austria; France; Germany
- Languages: German; Italian
- Box office: $177,193

Rimini is a 2022 drama film directed by Ulrich Seidl. It depicts Richie Bravo, a once-famous Austrian pop singer who has settled in Italy, as well as his estranged daughter and his retired father. Hans-Michael Rehberg plays the father, in his last film role. The film is the first in a diptych; the other film, Sparta, is about Richie's brother, Ewald. Rimini premiered at the 2022 Berlin International Film Festival.

== Cast ==
- Michael Thomas as Richie Bravo
- Tessa Göttlicher as Tessa
- Hans-Michael Rehberg as Father
- Inge Maux as Emmi Fleck
- Claudia Martini as Annie
- Georg Friedrich as Ewald

== Production ==
The character of Richie Bravo was written for Michael Thomas. Seidl conceived of the character after Thomas sang a Frank Sinatra song at a restaurant impromptu while shooting Import/Export (2007).

The film was shot in Austria, Italy, Romania, and Germany for a total of 85 days over the course of a year from March 2017. The shoot in Rimini was set to take place in November 2017, but was postponed until early 2018 because winter fog did not arrive as anticipated.

Seidl and Veronika Franz wrote the diptych originally as one film titled Wicked Games (German: Böse Spiele), with the two plotlines told in parallel, but they decided to split it into two films in the editing process. Seidl said, "the unifying element here is the search for happiness and the attempt to leave one's past behind. But it catches up with you, that is the bitter or perhaps liberating truth that the protagonists ultimately have to face."

Fritz Ostermayer and Herwig Zamernik wrote Richie Bravo's Schlager songs.

== Release ==
Rimini premiered in official competition at the 72nd Berlin International Film Festival in February 2022. It also screened at the 2022 Diagonale, where it won the prizes for Best Feature Film and Best Costume Design.

Wicked Games: Rimini Sparta, a 205-minute film consisting of Rimini and Sparta edited together, premiered at the International Film Festival Rotterdam on 29 January 2023. It screened at the Filmarchiv Austria on 4 March 2023, and at the Diagonale on 25 March 2023.

== Reception ==
On the review aggregator website Rotten Tomatoes, 94% of 16 critics' reviews are positive, with an average rating of 7.9/10. On Metacritic, the film has a weighted average score of 81 out of 100, based on six critics, indicating "universal acclaim".

Jessica Kiang of Variety called the film "an uncompromising, coldly provocative drama" and wrote that Thomas gives "such an astoundingly deep-dive performance it barely feels like performance at all".

Peter Bradshaw of The Guardian wrote that the film "is managed with unflinching conviction, a tremendous compositional sense and an amazing flair for discovering extraordinary locations", giving it four out of five stars.
