= Carpet hanger =

Outdoor stand used for cleaning carpets

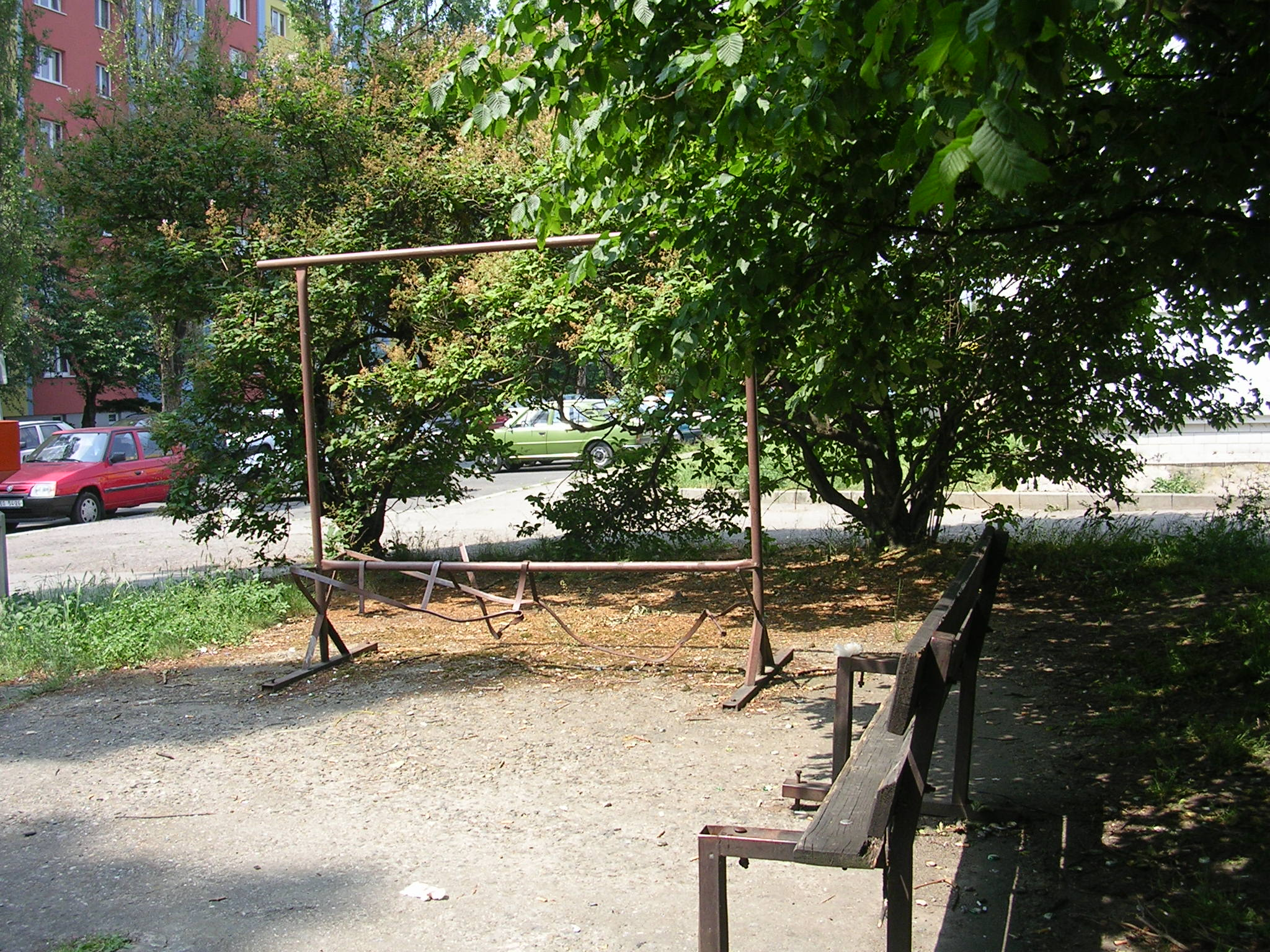
A carpet hanger in Prague

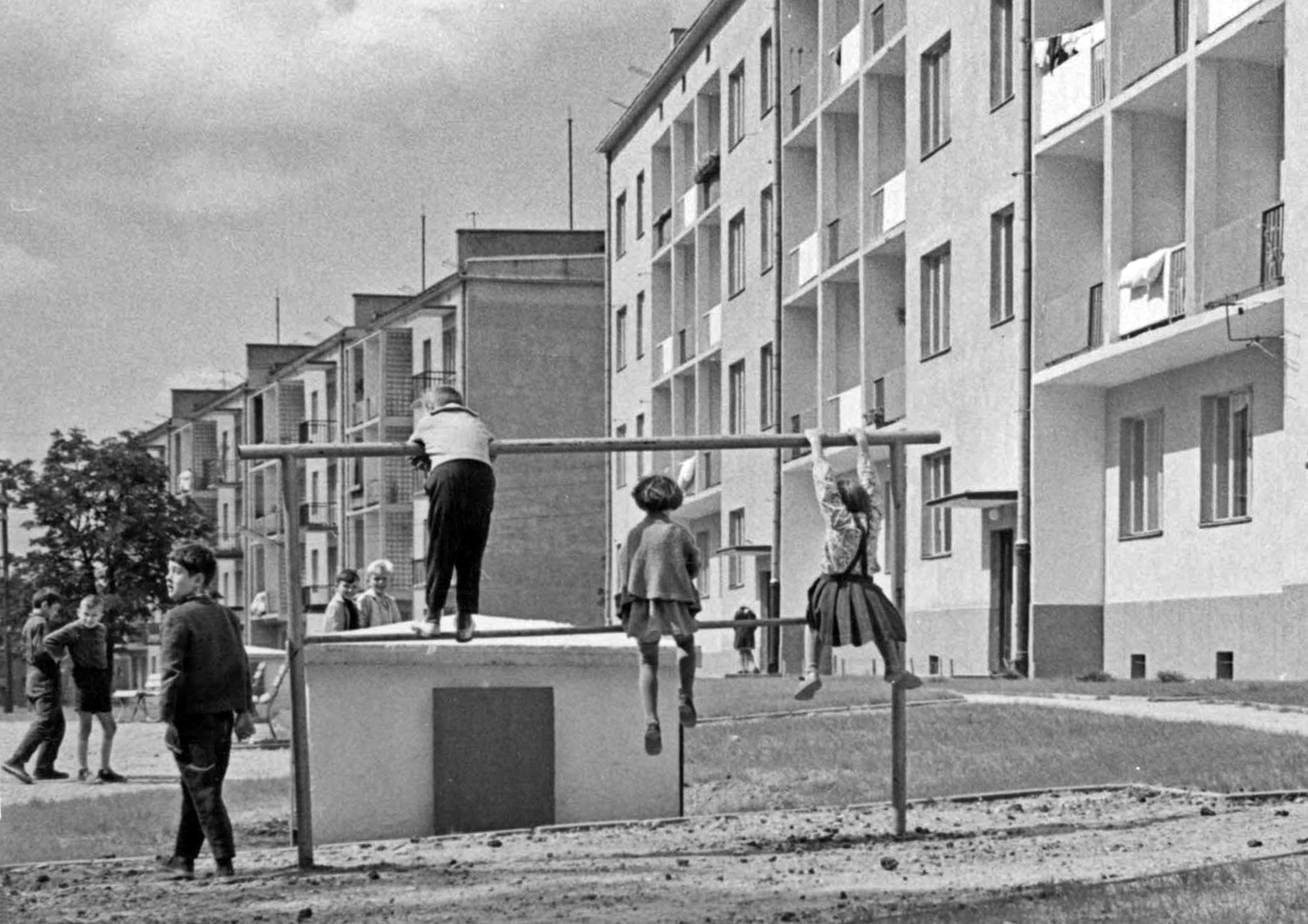
Children playing at a carpet hanger, Łódź, c. 1960s

The outdoor carpet hanger (also carpet stand or carpet rack) is a construction to hang carpets for cleaning with the help of carpet beaters. It is known in Germany, Poland, Lithuania, the Czech Republic, Finland, Sweden, Romania, Russia, and other countries.

== Secondary usage ==
It was a small center of social life. German writers Walter Benjamin and Erich Kästner described hangers as important places during their childhood. Children may use it as a playground, as a soccer goal, as a drumming implement, a gymnastic device, etc.

=== Poland ===
In Poland the outdoor railing for hanging the rug is called trzepak (a noun from the word trzepać, "to beat"; the beater itself is called trzepaczka).

Since the 1990s, it is very rare to see anyone using a trzepak for its prime function. In the newest housing developments, trzepak are rarely installed.

=== Romania ===
In Romania the carpet hanger (bara de bătut covoare or bătător de covoare) was an important landmark in the social life of each neighbourhood during the communist and post-communist period, where it served as a meeting point for neighbours and was frequently used in children's games. Before important holidays, queues would form around the railing, as few people owned a vacuum cleaner, and even those who did would still beat their carpets in order to 'freshen them up'. During the rest of the year, "it was generally used as a football goal by the boys, while it suddenly transformed girls into Nadia Comăneci."

The carpet hanger has been described as representing a sort of "Arc de Triomphe in front of the apartment block", while writer Paul Gabor dubbed it "the ancestral belly of the totalitarian regime" during the communist era.

In recent years, the carpet railing has been a topic of debate for urban planners and local authorities, as many Romanian cities have passed (and sometimes rescinded) laws forbidding their placement or decreeing their immediate removal, citing aesthetic or noise pollution reasons.

=== Sweden ===
In Sweden the carpet hanger is called piskställ, derived from piska (meaning "to whip") and ställ (meaning "stand").
