= Stermann & Grissemann =

Austrian German comedy duo

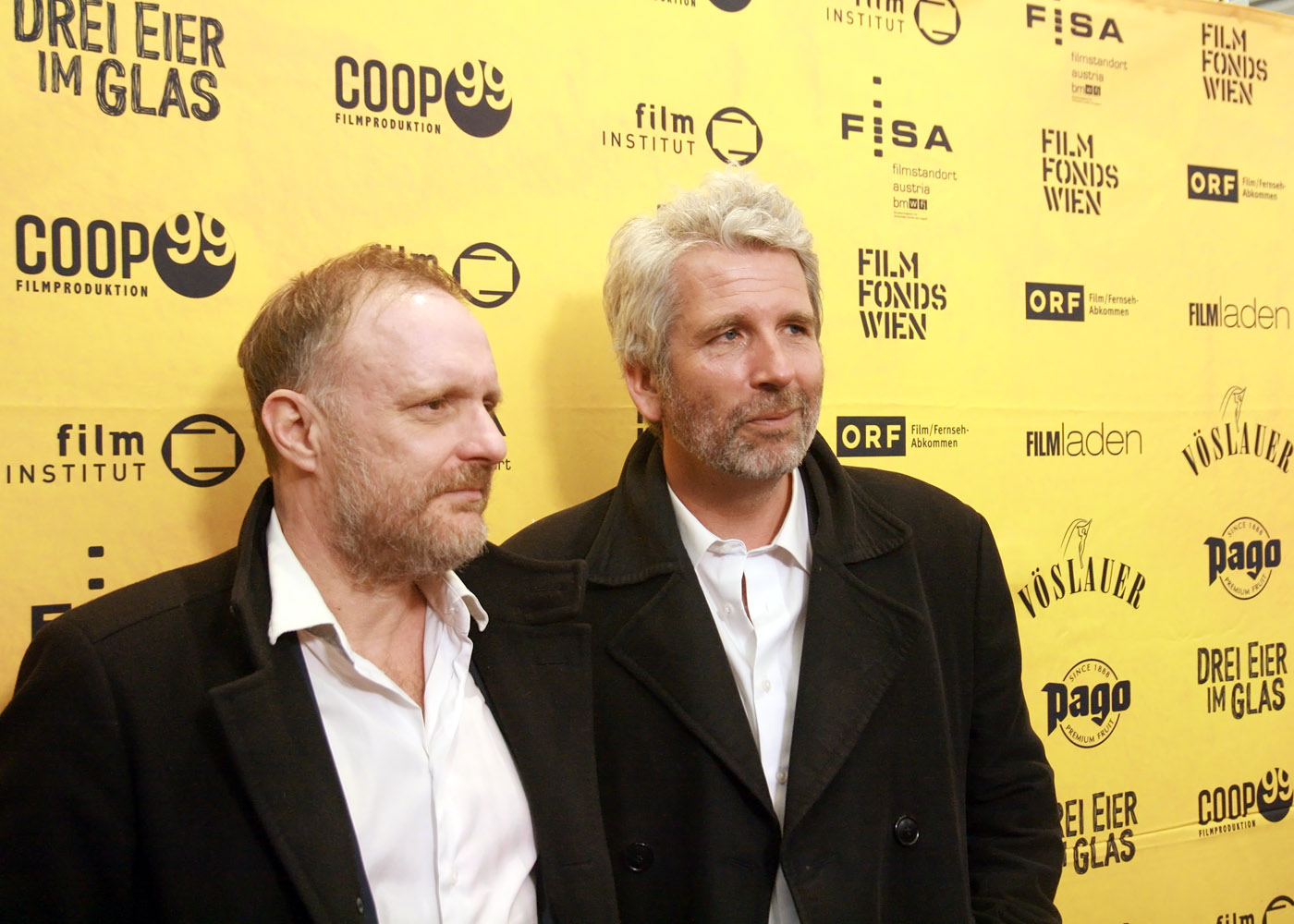
- Grissemann & Stermann in 2015

Comedy career
- Years active: 1988–present
- Medium: Radio, television presenters, comedians, entertainers

Stermann & Grissemann are an Austrian German comedy duo comprising Dirk Stermann and Christoph Grissemann.

== Background ==
=== Dirk Stermann ===
Dirk Stermann
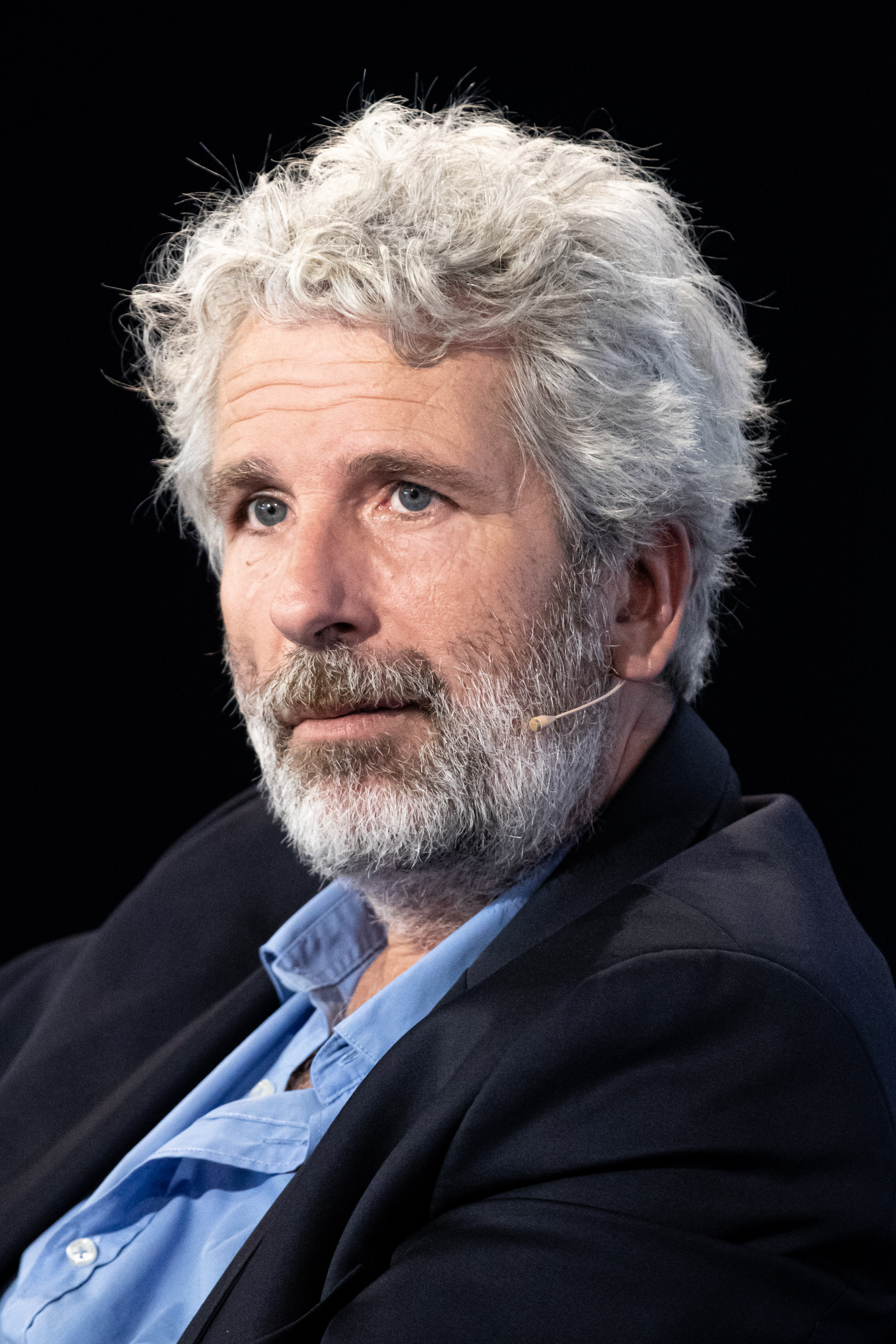
- Born: December 7, 1965 (age 60); Duisburg, Germany

Dirk Stermann (born 7 December 1965 in Duisburg) hails from Germany and is a German radio and television presenter and author. In 1987, Stermann moved to Vienna to study history and theatre studies but dropped out eventually. He started working for the broadcaster Österreichischer Rundfunk in 1988.

=== Christoph Grissemann ===
Christoph Grissemann
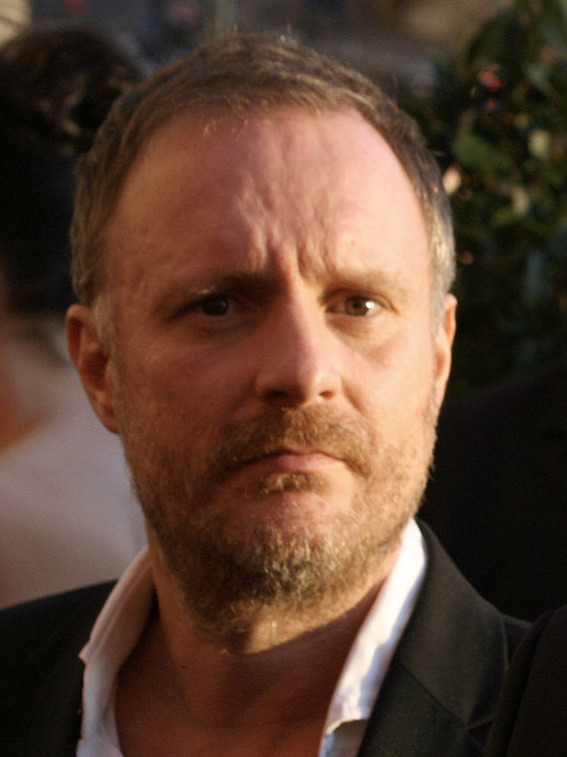
- Born: May 17, 1966 (age 60); Innsbruck, Austria
- Parent: Ernst Grissemann (father)

Christoph Grissemann (born 17 May 1966 in Innsbruck) is an Austrian comedian, radio and television presenter. Grissemann is the second and youngest son of Austrian radio and television presenter Ernst Grissemann. Grissemann made his Matura in the spa town of Baden bei Wien and began to study German literature, media studies and theatre studies in Vienna, but eventually dropped out. He took part in the Alternative civilian service. Following his father, Grissemann joined the broadcaster Österreichischer Rundfunk.

== Joining forces ==
Stermann and Grissemann met back in 1988 when they were working for ORF. In 1989 they created the weekly live comedy show Salon Helga on Hitradio Ö3 which they hosted there until 1995, when they moved the show to the new radio station FM4 and continued it until 2014. They also hosted a weekly live midnight dating show named Radio Blume on FM4 from 1995 to 1999. Between 1995 and 2002 they provided the FM4 radio commentary for the Eurovision Song Contest. Between 1998 and 2011 they were regular radio hosts for the regional German radio station Radio Eins.

== Television presenting ==
The duo forayed into television around 1996 with formats like Frau Pepi und die Buben, Suite 16, Blech oder Blume and Die schöne Show. In 2002 Stermann & Grissemann attempted to represent Austria at the Eurovision Song Contest 2002 with the song Das schönste Ding der Welt, where they finished 2nd. Also in 2002 they hosted the 2002 Edition of Salzburger Stier. From 2005 to 2010 they were sometime contributors to the late night show for ORF1 Dorfers Donnerstalk hosted by Alfred Dorfer. In 2007 they began hosting the late night talk show Willkommen Österreich, which has been running successfully since. Since May 2008 they have hosted the comedy show Im Anschluss: Neues aus Waldheim on Sky Deutschland. After 10 years Stermann & Grissemann returned to the commentary box for the Eurovision Song Contest where they provided the second layer of commentary for the 2012 Contest as well as the FM4 radio commentary.

== Work ==
=== Stage programmes ===
- 1999: Das Ende zweier Entertainer – Ein Scheißabend für alle Beteiligten
- 2000: Die Karawane des Grauens
- 2002: Willkommen in der Ohrfeigenanstalt
- 2005: Harte Hasen
- 2007: Die Deutsche Kochschau
- 2011: Stermann

=== Theater ===
- 2003: Seele brennt – A Tribute to Werner Schwab (with Hilde Sochor and Fritz Ostermayer)
- 2003: Marx Brothers Show

=== Books ===
- Als wir noch nicht von Funk und Fernsehen kaputtgemacht geworden sind? edition selene, Wien 1998, ISBN 3-852-66089-0
- Immer nie am Meer. edition selene, Wien 1999, ISBN 3-852-66115-3
- Willkommen in der Ohrfeigenanstalt. Hoanzl, Wien 2002, ISBN 3-902-30901-6
- be afraid honey, it's ... fm4. Die geheimen Anstalts-Tagebücher. edition selene, Wien 2004, ISBN 3-852-66256-7
- be afraid honey, it’s... fm4. Die geheimen Anstalts-Tagebücher von Stermann und Grissemann. Letzte Folge. edition selene, Wien 2005, ISBN 3-85266-271-0
- Debilenmilch. Tropen Verlag, Berlin 2007, ISBN 3-932170-55-5
- Speichelfäden in der Buttermilch: Gesammelte Werke I, Tropen Bei Klett-Cotta, Stuttgart 2011, ISBN 978-3-608-50404-0

=== CDs ===
- Salon Helga – von hinten
- Das Ende zweier Entertainer – Ein Scheißabend für alle Beteiligten
- Du auch
- Die Karawane des Grauens
- Sprechen Sie Österreichisch? (as speakers)
- 2002: Die schönste CD der Welt
- Willkommen in der Ohrfeigenanstalt
- Leck Mich im Arsch – Bäsle Briefe

=== DVDs ===
- Harte Hasen
- Immer nie am Meer
- Wollt Ihr das totale Sieb!?
- Guten Morgen
