= Hans-Michael Rehberg =

German actor (1938–2017)

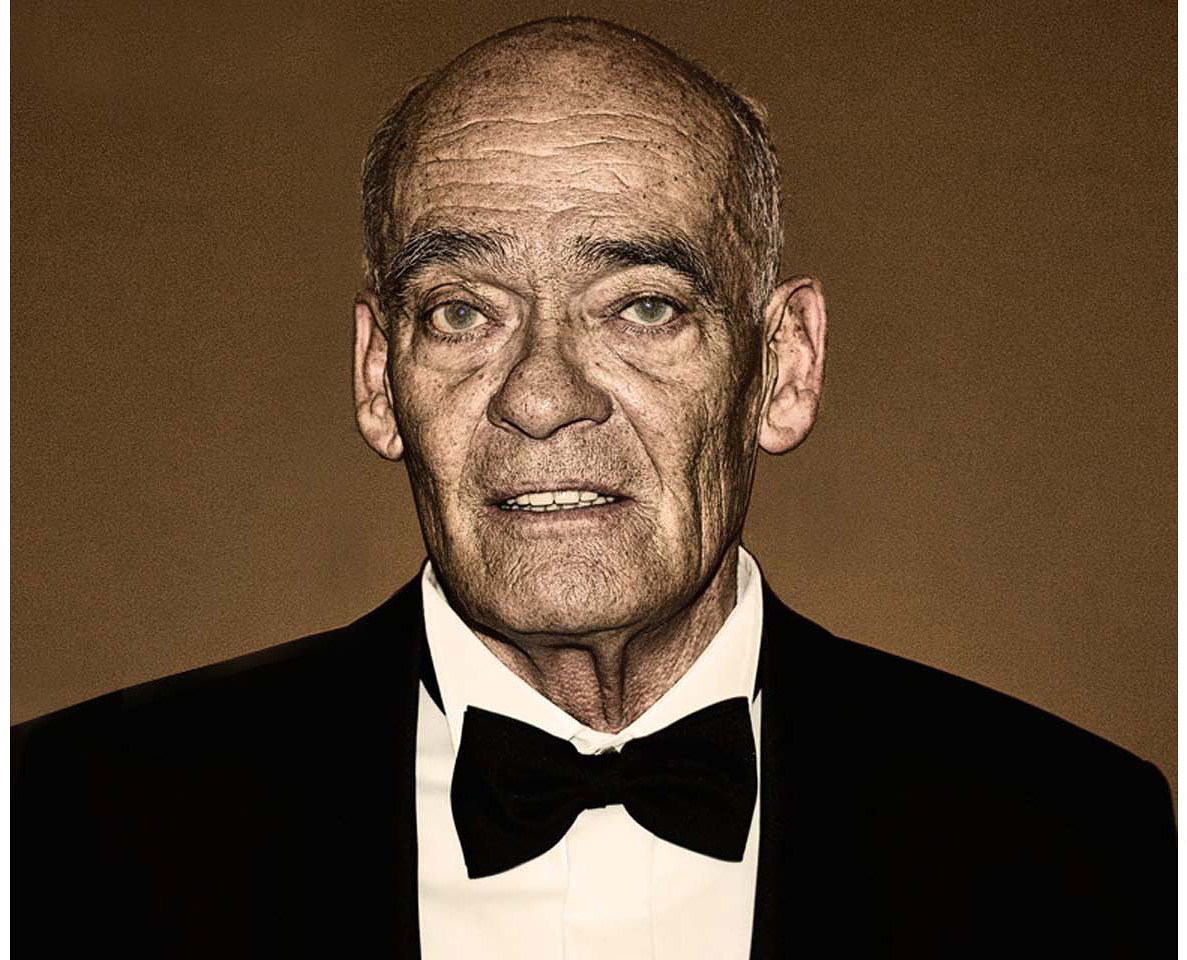
- Born: 2 April 1938; Fürstenwalde, Germany
- Died: 7 November 2017 (aged 79); Berlin
- Occupation: Actor

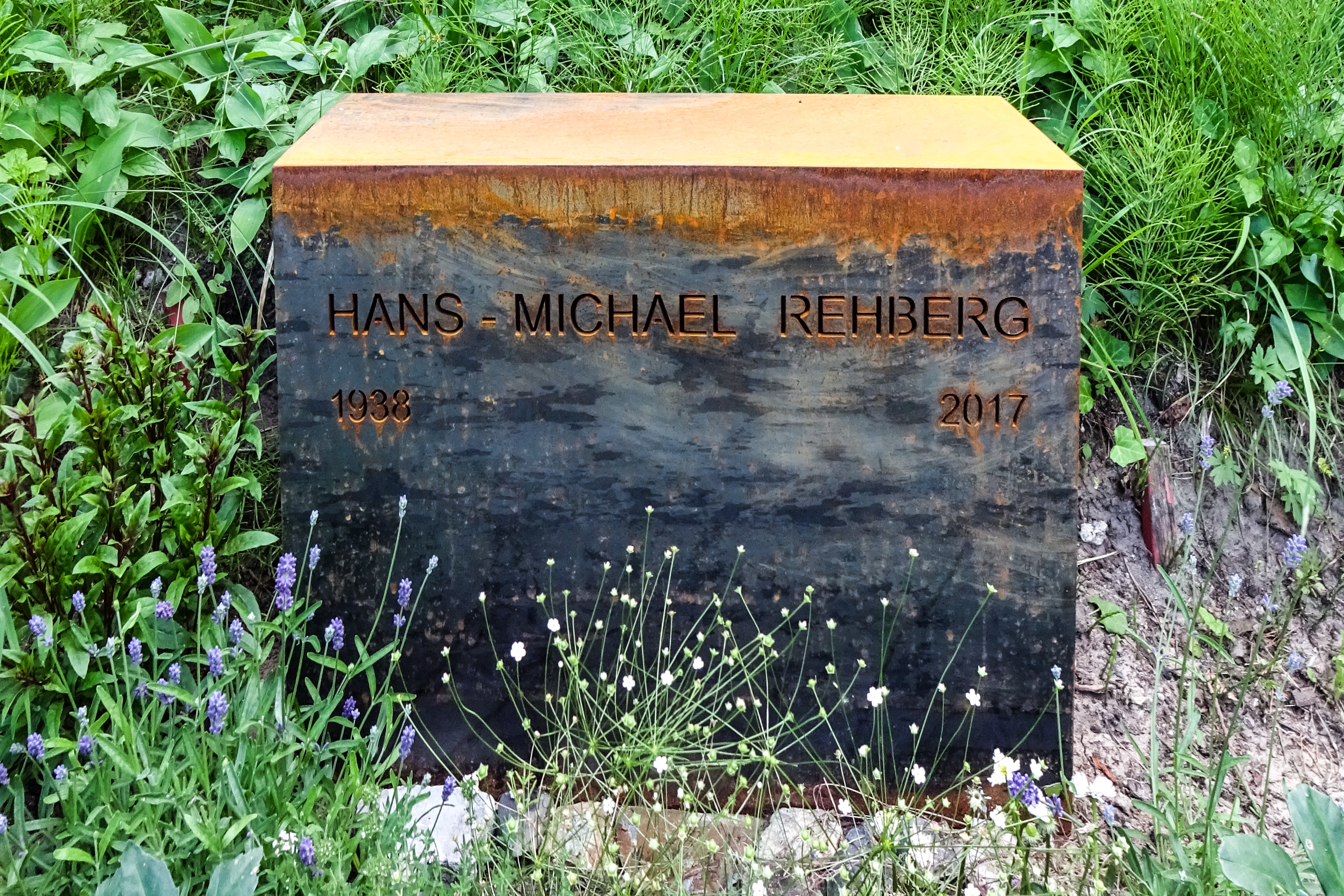
Grave of German actor Hans-Michael Rehberg in Friedhof Heerstraße in Berlin-Westend

Hans-Michael Rehberg (2 April 1938 – 7 November 2017) was a German actor.

== Biography ==
Rehberg, born in Fürstenwalde, Brandenburg, was one of six children. He grew up in Bavaria after the family moved to Lake Starnberg. After training as an actor at the Folkwang School in Essen from 1956 to 1958, his professional career began at the Theater Krefeld und Mönchengladbach. He soon came to the Residenztheater in Munich, where he was appointed Bavarian State Actor at the age of 30. In 1973 he moved to the Münchner Kammerspiele, in 1975 to the Schauspielhaus Hamburg. The versatile actor was present in theater, television and cinema. Rehberg was also active as a director and has received several awards for his work. He was at home on almost every major German-speaking theatre stage. Rehberg died in Berlin at the age of 79.

== Awards ==
- 1968: Appointment to Bayerischer Staatsschauspieler
- 1994: Austrian theatre award Kainz Medal
- 1999: Gertrud-Eysoldt-Ring
- 2000: Bayerischer Fernsehpreis
- 2015: Award of the Deutsche Akademie für Fernsehen, Actor leading role

== Filmography ==
Year	Title	Role	Notes
1974	Supermarket	Homosexueller	
1977	Die Konsequenz	Rusterholz, Anstaltsleiter	
1979	The Day Elvis Came to Bremerhaven	Herbert Teschner	
1980	As Far as the Eye Sees	Richard Kuhl	
1982	War and Peace	General	
1983	Strange Fruits	Feininger	
1984	Der Havarist	Psychiatrist	
1984	Cold Fever	Dr. Schumann	
1985	The Assault of the Present on the Rest of Time	Herr von Gerlach	
1986	Stammheim	Siegfried Buback – Generalbundesanwalt	
1986	Rosa Luxemburg	Waldemar Pabst	
1987	Schmutz	Oberkontrollor	
1989	C*A*S*H: A Political Fairy Tale	Lawyer	
1989	Der Geschichtenerzähler	Herr Jensen	
1989	Seven Minutes	Brecht	
1990	Das Geheimnis des gelben Geparden	Dr. Vial	TV film
1990	Death of a Schoolboy	School headmaster	
1991	Love at First Sight	Elsa's Father	
1991	Das tätowierte Herz		
1993	Wehner – die unerzählte Geschichte	Kurt Schumacher	TV film
1993	The Lucona Affair	Minister Robert Falk	
1993	Im Himmel hört Dich niemand weinen		
1993	Domenica	Josef Rothenberg	
1993	Schindler's List	Rudolf Höß	
1993	Engel ohne Flügel		
1993	Shiva und die Galgenblume	Graf Gortschakoff	Documentary film about an unfinished film from 1945
1995	Deathmaker	Kommissar Rätz	
1996	Peanuts – The Bank Pays Everything	Ibrahim Jafari	
1998	Campus	Hirschberg	
2000	Die Einsamkeit der Krokodile	Dr. Wiemann	
2001	Passing Summer	Valerie's Professor	
2002	Gebürtig	Konrad Sachs	Voice
2003	Hamlet X	King	
2003	Mein Name ist Bach	Medikus	
2003	MA 2412 – Die Staatsdiener		
2004	The Architects	Daniel Tieck	TV film
2004	Traumschiff Surprise – Periode 1	Regulator Rogul	
2009	Lulu and Jimi	Von Oppeln	
2009	Phantomanie	Edgar	
2009	Germany 09	Narrator	Voice, (segment "Séance")
2009	Mord ist mein Geschäft, Liebling	Christopher Kimbel	
2010	Kennedy's Brain	Ingvar Holmqvist	TV film
2010	Transfer	Hermann	
2010	Young Goethe in Love	Kammermeier	
2011	My Best Enemy	Karel Brinek	
2012	The Wall	Cottager	
2012	Leg ihn um! – Ein Familienfilm	August Manzl	
2014	The Dark Valley	Brenner	
2016	Original Bliss	Reitinger	
2022	Rimini	The father	
