= Carpet beater =

Type of household cleaning tool used to clean carpets and rugs

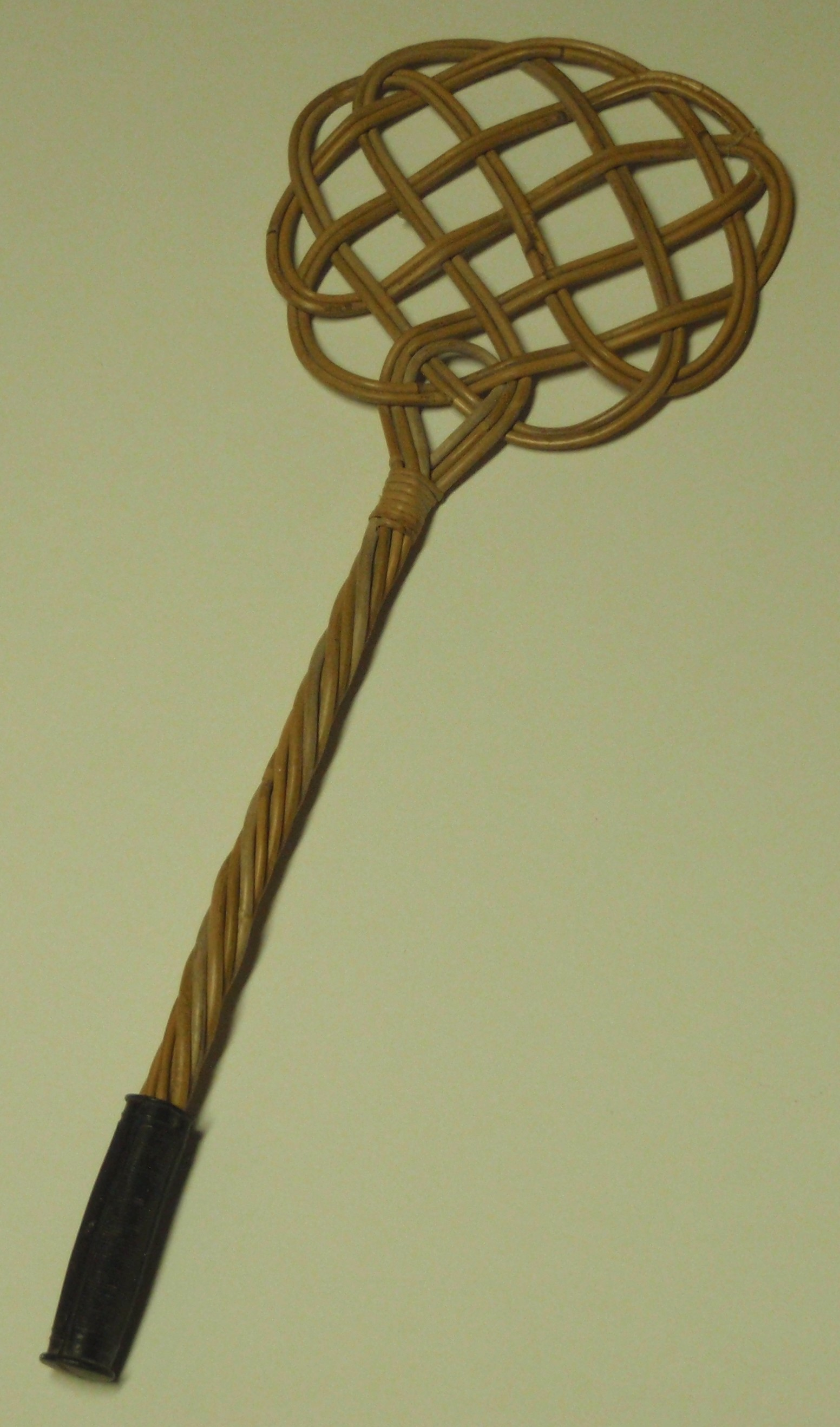
A carpet beater

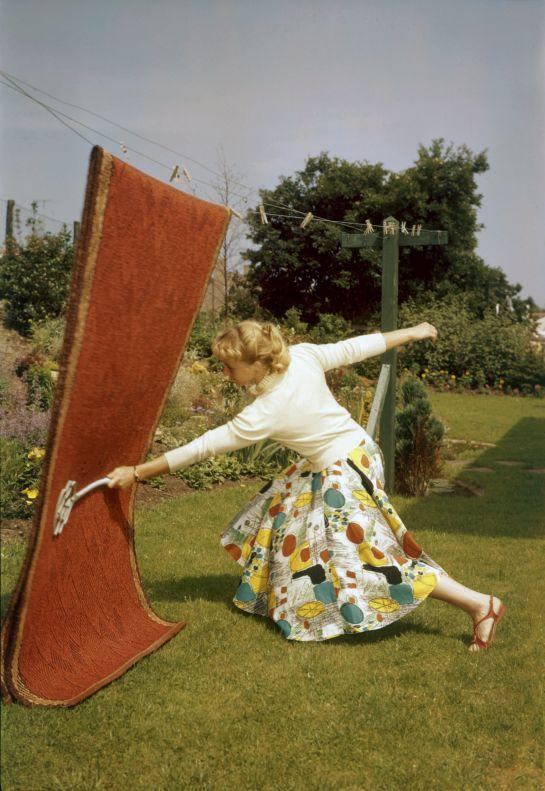
"Household gymnastics"

A carpet beater or carpetbeater (also referred to as a rug beater or rugbeater, carpet whip, rug whip, clothes-beater, dust beater or dustbeater, carpet duster, wicker slapper, rug duster, or pillow fluffer, and formerly also as a carpet cleaner or rug cleaner) is a housecleaning tool used to beat carpets in order to shake dust and dirt out of them. It was in common use until the vacuum cleaner became widely affordable.

Typically made of wood, rattan, cane, wicker, spring steel or coiled wire, antique rug beaters have become very collectible. Modern mass-production versions can also be in plastic or wire.

== Operation ==
Carpets, rugs, clothes, cushions, and bedding were hung over a clothesline, railing, or a special carpet hanger, and the dust and dirt was beaten out of them. Some people preferred to beat carpets in winter on the snow. They laid the carpet face down and beat it. This method had some advantages: for instance, insects would freeze to death even if they were not expelled through beating, but it left a dirty and unpleasant-looking patch on the snow, and therefore some communities forbade beating on the snow for aesthetic reasons. Another way is to spread some snow over the carpet. In this way the dust is caught but the snow does not go up in the air.

Its use in cleaning has been largely replaced since the 1950s by the carpet sweeper and then the vacuum cleaner, although they are still sold in many household stores throughout Europe.

A carpet beater may also be used to beat the dust out of sofas, futons, etc. In this case the beaten furniture is covered by a wet rag to collect dust.
